= USCGC Kukui =

Kukui is the name of three cutters of the United States Coast Guard:

- USCGC Kukui (WAGL-225), a 190 ft (58 m) Manzanita-class buoy tender Originally built for the U.S. Lighthouse Service.
- USCGC Kukui (WAK-186), a 338 ft (103 m) cargo ship commissioned March 1946. ex-USS Colquitt (AK-174)
- USCGC Kukui (WLB-203), a 225 ft (69 m) Juniper-class seagoing buoy tender commissioned in 1998.
