= USCGC Laurel =

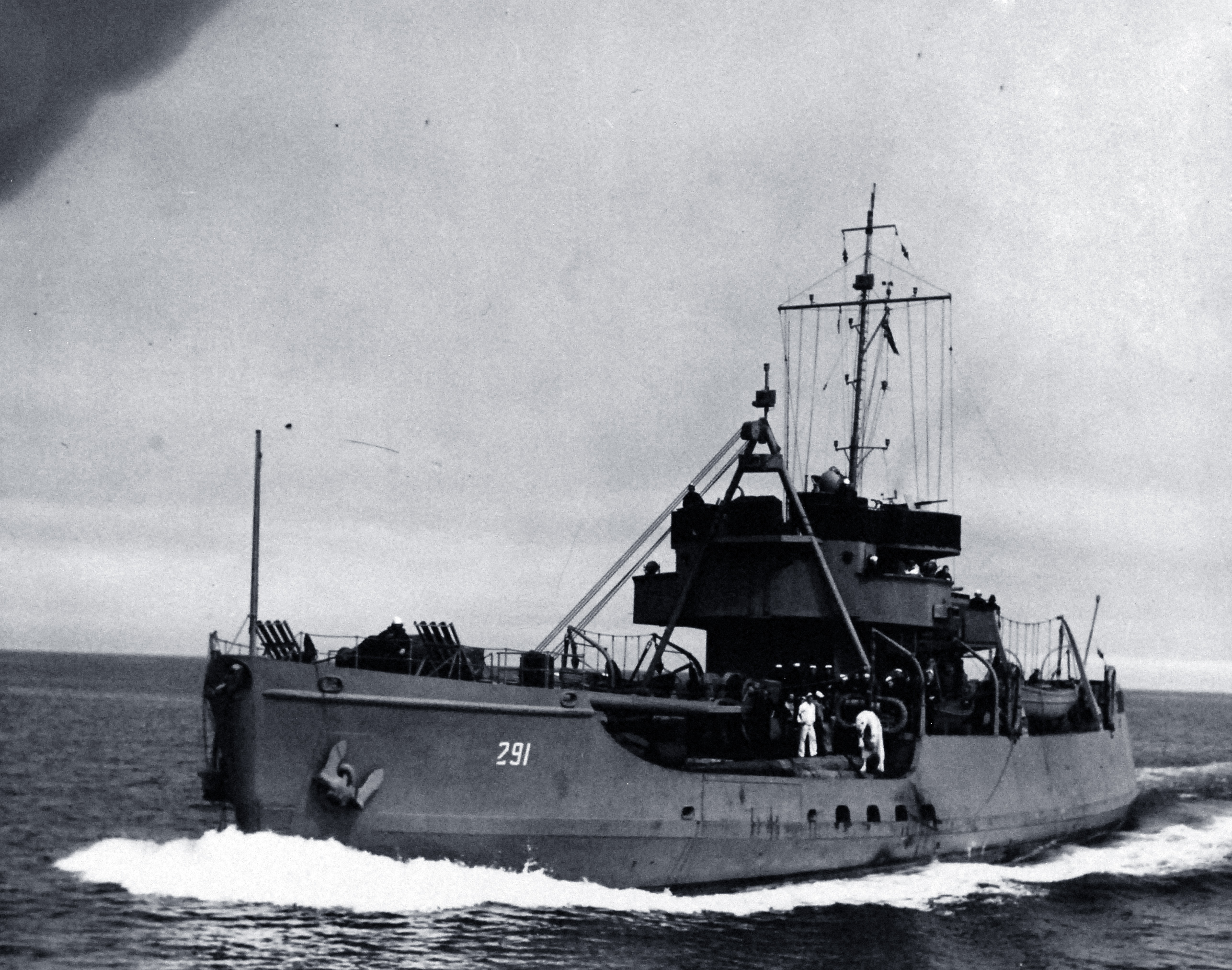
- USCGC Laurel in Hudson Bay, Canada

History

United States
- Name: USCGC Laurel (WLB-291)
- Builder: Zenith Dredge Corporation
- Cost: $902,656
- Laid down: 17 April 1942
- Launched: 4 August 1942
- Commissioned: 24 November 1942
- Decommissioned: 1 December 1999
- Reclassified: WLB-291 1965
- Identification: IMO number: 8743816; Call Sign: NRPJ
- Fate: Sold at GSA auction, converted to party boat.

General characteristics
- Displacement: 935 fl (1945); 1,026 fl (1966); 700 light (1966)
- Length: 180 ft (55 m)
- Beam: 37 ft (11 m)
- Draft: 12 ft (3.7 m) (1945); 14 ft 7 in (4.45 m) (1966)
- Installed power: 2 × Westinghouse generators; 2 × Cooper-Bessemer-type GND-8, 4-cycle diesel engines
- Propulsion: 1 electric motor; single screw
- Speed: Sustained: 13 knots (24 km/h; 15 mph) (1945); 11.9 knots (22.0 km/h; 13.7 mph) (1966); Economic: 8.3 knots (15.4 km/h; 9.6 mph) (1945); 8.5 knots (15.7 km/h; 9.8 mph) (1966)
- Complement: 6 Officers, 74 enlisted (1945); 4 officers, 2 warrants, 47 enlisted (1966)

USCGC Laurel WAGL/WLB-291, a Cactus- or A-class United States Coast Guard seagoing buoy tender was built by Zenith Dredge of Duluth, Minnesota. Her keel was laid 17 April 1942, launched 4 August 1942 and commissioned on 24 November 1942.

== History ==
Immediately after being commissioned Laurel was stationed at Philadelphia, Pennsylvania until 8 October 1943 when she was reassigned and stationed at Boston, Massachusetts. There she joined her sister ships Cactus, Cowslip, and Conifer. She was used primarily for cargo and passenger transport and for escort and icebreaker duties in Greenland waters. For a brief time, from 3 September 1946 to 8 December 1946 Laurel was stationed at Portland, Maine.

On 8 December 1946 Laurel was reassigned to Rockland, Maine and used for maintaining navigational aids, search and rescue operations and ice breaking. On 4–5 January 1953 she towed fishing vessel Estrella to Gloucester, Massachusetts. On 27 May 1957 she towed fishing vessel Regina Maria to Rockland, Maine, and on 7–8 August 1958 was the on-scene operational commander following a collision between cargo ships MV S.E. Graham and SS Gulfoil at the entrance to Narragansett Bay during a heavy fog.

On 10 January 1959 she assisted fishing vessels Bobby and Harvey off Rockland, Maine, on 13–14 March 1959 she assisted disabled lobsterman Betty Lu, on 25 November 1959 she assisted the tug Alta May and tow near Rockland, Maine, and on 4 July 1967 she recovered the wreckage and bodies from a private plane that had crashed into the water off of Moose Point, Maine. On 21 May 1969 Laurel was reassigned to Morehead City, North Carolina to continue her duties as a buoy tender and search and rescue vessel. On 22–28 January 1970 she helped fight a fire on the Norwegian motor vessel Thordis Prethus off the North Carolina coast.

In the fall of 1974 Laurel underwent a minor renovation before being reassigned in January 1975 to Ketchikan, Alaska. While in Ketchikan she was used for maintaining navigational aids, search and rescue operations, icebreaking, law and treaty enforcement and securing US territorial waters. In September 1983 she was moved again to San Pedro, California. In addition to her usual duties she was used for MX missile tests, NOAA buoy deployments and mine-laying. In May 1984 Laurel sustained major damage to her main motor and was towed to Point Loma by the Coast Guard cutter Confidence.

From July 1986 to 1990, Laurel had major renovations to machinery, living spaces and superstructure under the Service Life Extension Program (SLEP). New main General Motors diesels were installed, new generators, propulsion systems, new vang supported boom system (eliminating the distinctive Cactus-class, A-frame boom support), marine sanitation system, navigational electronics and more.

Following SLEP, Laurel was dispatched to Mayport, Florida where she continued her buoy tender duties until she was decommissioned on 1 December 1999 and sold at GSA auction.

By 2014, Laurel had been converted into a party boat and renamed Coral Vision, now homeported in Port of Spain, Trinidad and Tobago.
