= USCGC Redbud =

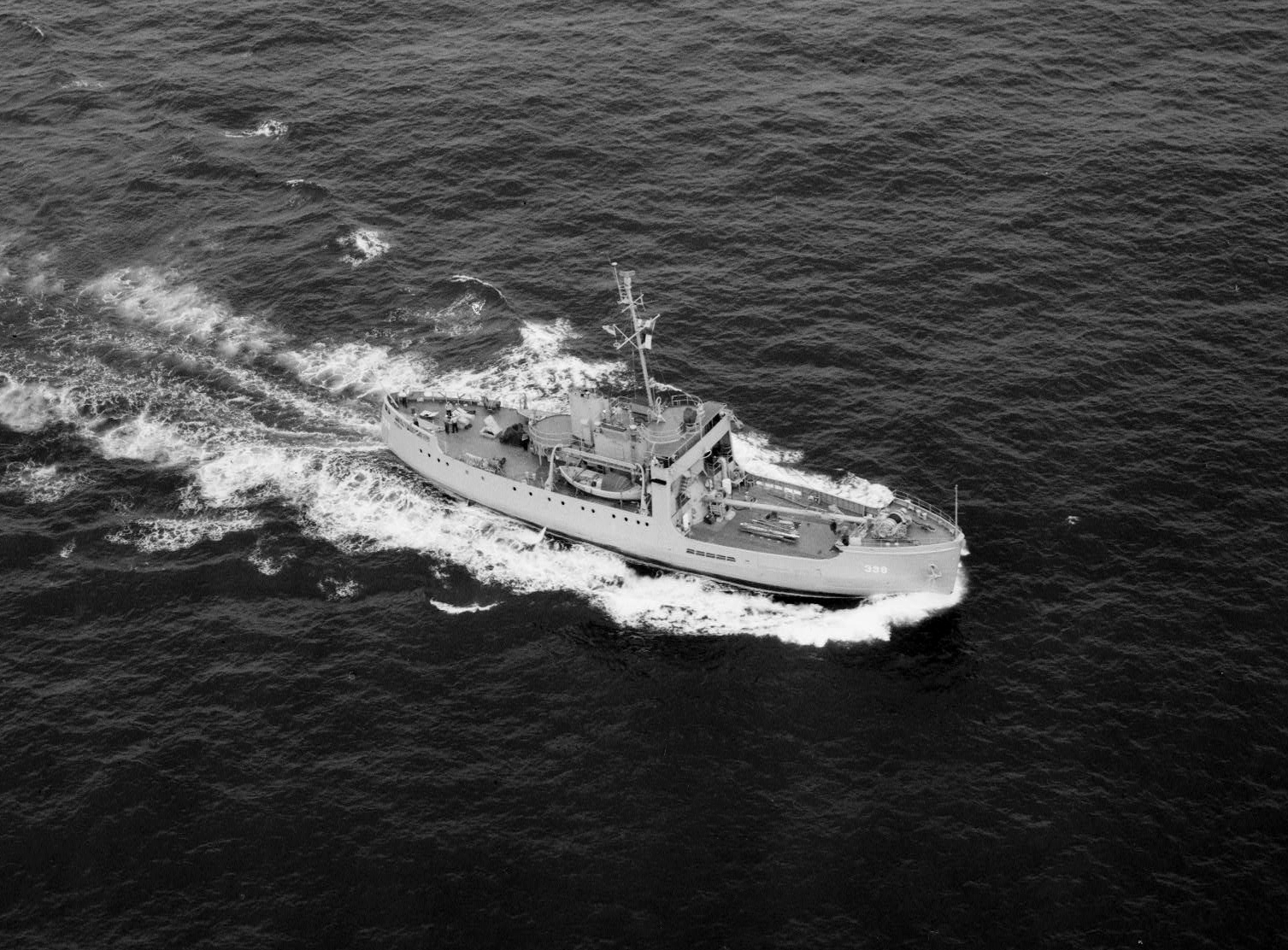
- USS Redbud (AKL-398) underway in 1949

History

United States
- Laid down: 21 July 1943
- Launched: 11 September 1943
- Commissioned: 2 May 1944
- Stricken: 20 November 1970
- Fate: Sold to the Republic of the Philippines 1 March 1972

General characteristics
- Class & type: Iris (Class C)
- Displacement: 1,025 long tons (1,041 t)
- Length: 180 ft (54.9 m)
- Beam: 38 ft (11.6 m)
- Draft: 13 ft (4.0 m)
- Propulsion: 2 × Westinghouse generators driven by 2 Cooper-Bessemer GND8 diesel engines
- Speed: 13.5 kn (25.0 km/h; 15.5 mph) maximum
- Range: 12,000 nmi (22,000 km; 14,000 mi)
- Complement: 81
- Armament: 1 × 3 in (76 mm)/50; 4 × 20 mm/80; 2 depth charge tracks; 2 × Mousetrap

The USCGC Redbud (WLB-398) was one of 20 "C" class 180-foot (55 m) buoy tenders that entered service during World War II. She was assigned to the 7th Naval District and was based out of Miami, Florida, where she serviced aids to navigation. She was loaned to the U.S. Navy on 18 March 1949 and was redesignated as AKL-398 (although the Navy retained her Coast Guard-given name) on 31 March 1949. The Navy had her converted at Long Beach, California and she was commissioned on 23 July 1949 under the command of LCDR F. E. Clark, USN.

Following shakedown, Redbud departed Long Beach 3 August 1949 and headed for the east coast. On 18 September she arrived at Boston, whence she continued on to NS Argentia, Newfoundland, to join the support force for the construction and maintenance of air bases and early warning installations in the North Atlantic and Arctic areas. Through the end of the year and into 1950, she operated along the southwestern coast of Greenland, adding more northerly ports and those on the Canadian side of Baffin Bay to her schedule during the warmer months. Until 28 February 1952, she continued her support of Arctic bases, rehabilitating navigational aids, activating and repairing submarine petroleum lines, and delivering bulk petroleum and general cargo, as a commissioned U.S. Navy ship. Then decommissioned, she was simultaneously placed in service, assigned to MSTS, and, with a civil-service crew, returned to sealift support for the Northeast Command (SUNEC).

In 1956, Redbud's schedule was altered to include winter (November through March) supply runs to the Texas Towers which alternated with warmer weather (April through October) SUNEC duties. Maintaining that schedule through the 1960s, her primary mission continued to be her SUNEC missions, and, until 1970, she was usually the first MSTS ship to arrive in the far north to open a new resupply season.

On 10 November 1970, she was returned to the Coast Guard and was struck from the Navy list ten days later. She was then transferred to the Republic of the Philippines on 1 March 1972 under a grant-in-aid. She served the Philippines as Kalinga (AG-89).
