= USCGC Mallow =

United States Coast Guard buoy tender

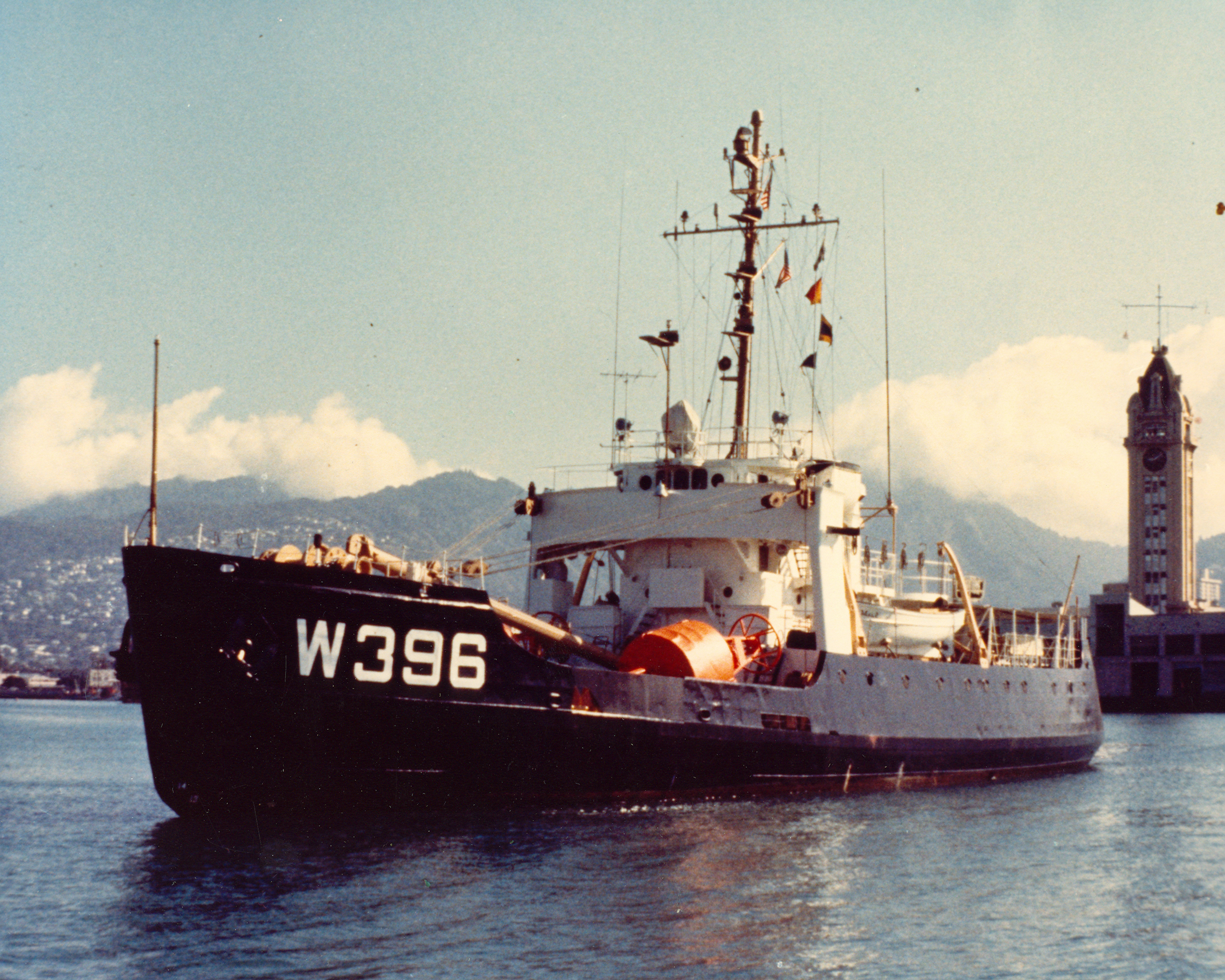
- USCGC Mallow underway in Honolulu Harbor

History

United States
- Name: Mallow
- Namesake: Mallow plant
- Builder: Zenith Dredge Corporation
- Laid down: 10 October 1943
- Launched: 9 December 1943
- Commissioned: 6 June 1944
- Decommissioned: 15 May 1997
- Fate: Sold for scrap

General characteristics
- Class & type: Iris-class buoy tender
- Displacement: 935 long tons (950 t)
- Length: 180 ft (55 m)
- Beam: 47 ft 1 in (14.35 m)
- Draft: 12 ft (3.7 m)
- Propulsion: 1 × electric motor connected to 2 Westinghouse generators driven by 2 Cooper Bessemer-type GND-8, 4-cycle diesels; single screw
- Speed: 8.3 kn (15.4 km/h; 9.6 mph) cruising; 13 kn (24 km/h; 15 mph) maximum
- Complement: 6 officers; 74 enlisted
- Armament: 1 × 3 inch gun; 2 × 20 mm/80; 2 × depth charge tracks; 2 × Mousetraps; 4 × Y-guns

The USCGC Mallow (WLB-396) was a Iris-class buoy tender belonging to the United States Coast Guard launched on 9 December 1943 and commissioned on 6 June 1944.

== Design ==
The Iris-class buoy tenders were constructed after the Mesquite-class buoy tenders. Mallow cost $926,926 to construct and had an overall length of 180 feet (55 m). She had a beam of 37 feet (11 m) and a draft of up to 12 feet (3.7 m) at the time of construction, although this was increased to 14 feet 7 inches (4.45 m) in 1966. She initially had a displacement of 935 long tons (950 t; 1,047 short tons); this was increased to 1,026 long tons (1,042 t; 1,149 short tons) in 1966. It was powered by one electric motor. This was connected up to two Westinghouse generators which were driven by two Cooper Bessemer GND-8 four-cycle diesel engines. She had a single screw.

The Iris-class buoy tenders had maximum sustained speeds of 13 knots (24 km/h; 15 mph), although this diminished to around 11.9 knots (22.0 km/h; 13.7 mph) in 1966. For economic and effective operation, they had to initially operate at 8.3 knots (15.4 km/h; 9.6 mph), although this increased to 8.5 knots (15.7 km/h; 9.8 mph) in 1966. The ships had a complement of six officers and seventy-four crew members in 1945; this decreased to two warrants, four officers, and forty-seven men in 1966. They were fitted with a SL1 radar system and QBE-3A sonar system in 1945. Their armament consisted of one 3"/50 caliber gun, two 20 mm/80 guns, two Mousetraps, two depth charge tracks, and four Y-guns in 1945; these were removed in 1966.

== Career ==
International radio call sign of USCGC Mallow (WLB-396)
November	Oscar	Delta	Oscar

Upon being commissioned in June 1944, Mallow was assigned to the 12th Coast Guard District and homeported in San Francisco where she was used for ATON in the Pacific until the end of World War II. After the war, starting in September 1946, she was stationed in Astoria, Oregon. In February 1958, Mallow assisted Yuma with towing Tinian 6 miles south of Swiftsure Bank. In February 1989, she assisted with recovering debris from the United Airlines Flight 811 crash off Hawaii. The Mallow was scrapped at the head of the Wicomico River in Salisbury Maryland.

== See also ==
- List of United States Coast Guard cutters
