= USCGC Firebush =

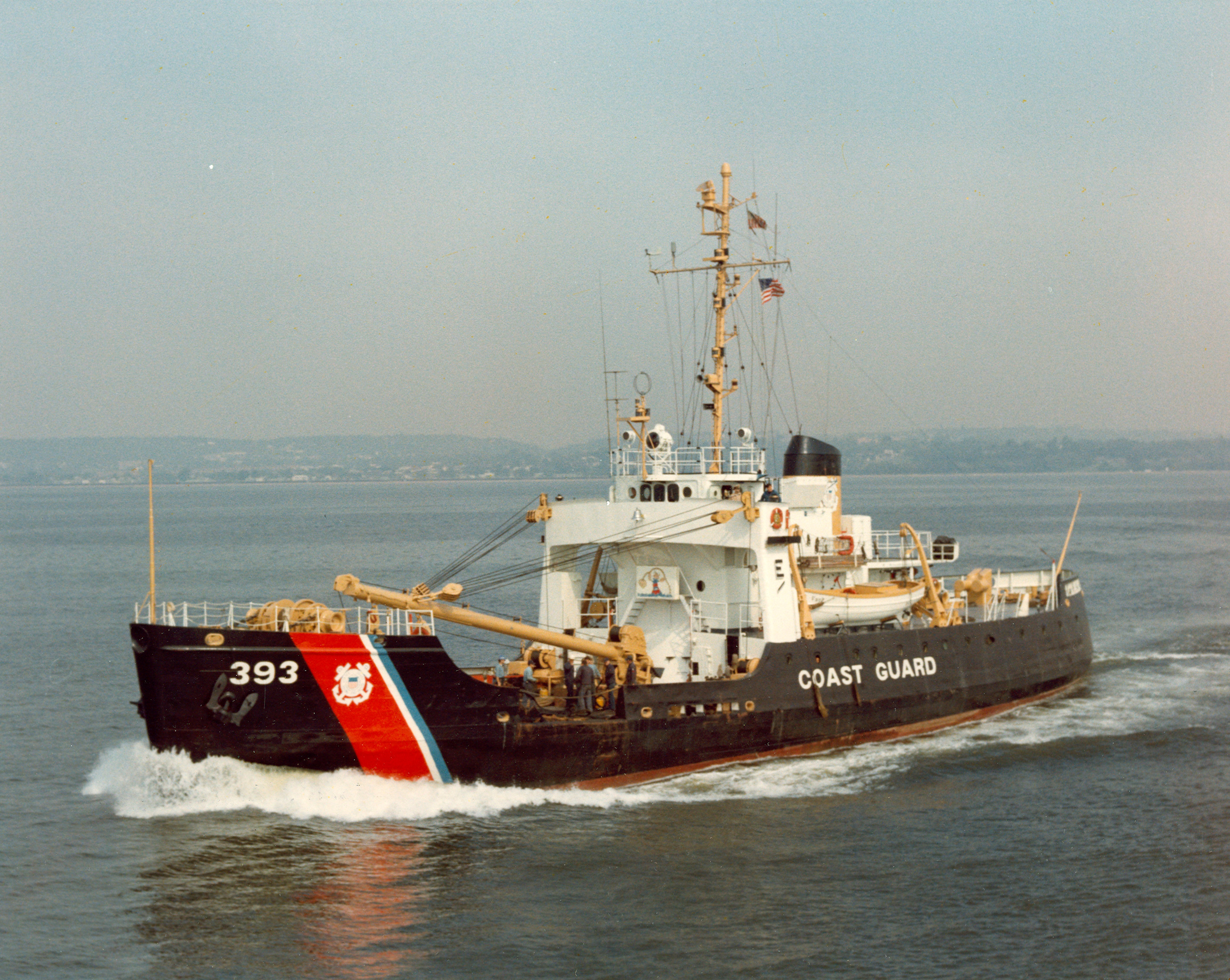
- USCGC Firebush underway

History

United States
- Name: Firebush
- Builder: Zenith Dredge Corporation
- Laid down: 12 November 1943
- Launched: 3 February 1944
- Commissioned: 20 July 1944
- Decommissioned: 26 May 2003
- Fate: Transferred to Nigerian Navy 30 June 2003
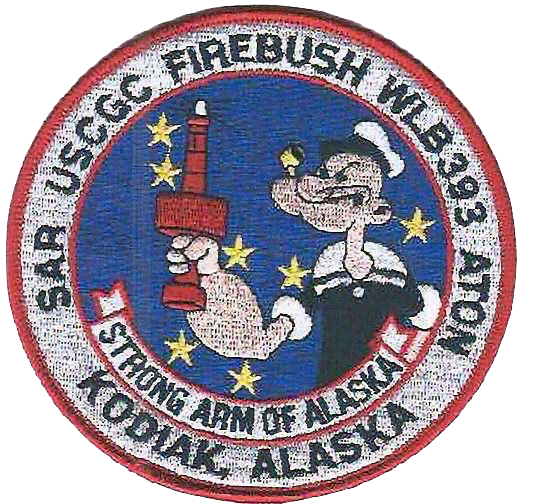
- Badge

Nigeria
- Name: Nwamba
- Commissioned: 30 June 2003
- Identification: MMSI number: 657710000
- Status: Active as of July 2015

General characteristics
- Class & type: Iris-class buoy tender
- Displacement: 935 long tons (950 t)
- Length: 180 ft (55 m)
- Beam: 47 ft 1 in (14.35 m)
- Draft: 12 ft (3.7 m)
- Propulsion: 1 × electric motor connected to 2 Westinghouse generators driven by 2 Cooper Bessemer-type GND-8, 4-cycle diesels; single screw
- Speed: 8.3 kn (15.4 km/h; 9.6 mph) cruising; 13 kn (24 km/h; 15 mph) maximum
- Complement: 6 officers; 74 enlisted
- Armament: 1 × 3-inch gun; 2 × 20 mm/80 gun; 2 × depth charge tracks; 2 × Mousetraps; 4 × Y-guns

USCGC Firebush (WLB-393) was an Iris-class buoy tender belonging to the United States Coast Guard launched on 3 February 1944 and commissioned on 20 July 1944. She was eventually transferred to the Nigerian Navy in June 2003 and renamed Nwamba.

== Design ==
The Iris-class buoy tenders were constructed after the Mesquite-class buoy tenders. Firebush cost $926,446 to construct and had an overall length of 180 feet (55 m). She had a beam of 37 feet (11 m) and a draft of up to 12 feet (3.7 m) at the time of construction, although this was increased to 14 feet 7 inches (4.45 m) in 1966. She initially had a displacement of 935 long tons (950 t); this was increased to 1,026 long tons (1,042 t) in 1966. She was powered by one electric motor. This was connected up to two Westinghouse generators which were driven by two Cooper Bessemer GND-8 four-cycle diesel engines. The vessel had a single screw.

The Iris-class buoy tenders had maximum sustained speeds of 13 knots (24 km/h; 15 mph), although this diminished to around 11.9 knots (22.0 km/h; 13.7 mph) in 1966. For economic and effective operation, they had to initially operate at 8.3 knots (15.4 km/h; 9.6 mph), although this increased to 8.5 knots (15.7 km/h; 9.8 mph) in 1966. The ships had a complement of six officers and seventy-four crew members in 1945; this decreased to two warrants, four officers, and forty-seven men in 1966. They were fitted with a SL1 radar system and QBE-3A sonar system in 1945. Their armament consisted of one 3"/50 caliber gun, two 20 mm/80-caliber guns, two Mousetraps, two depth charge tracks, and four Y-guns in 1945; these were removed in 1966.

== Career ==
International radio call sign of USCGC Firebush (WLB-393)
November	Oscar	Delta	Lima

Firebush was first assigned to the 3rd Coast Guard District and homeported in St. George, Staten Island, and later to Governors Island, New York, where she was used for ATON duties during the end of World War II. In June 1979, she was transferred to Kodiak, Alaska to assist with ATON in Alaskan waters. During her time there, she tended 140 aids to navigation including 83 buoys. In May 2003, Firebush was decommissioned and turned over to the Nigerian Navy.

== See also ==
- List of United States Coast Guard cutters
