= USCGC Hickory =

United States Coast Guard seagoing buoy tender

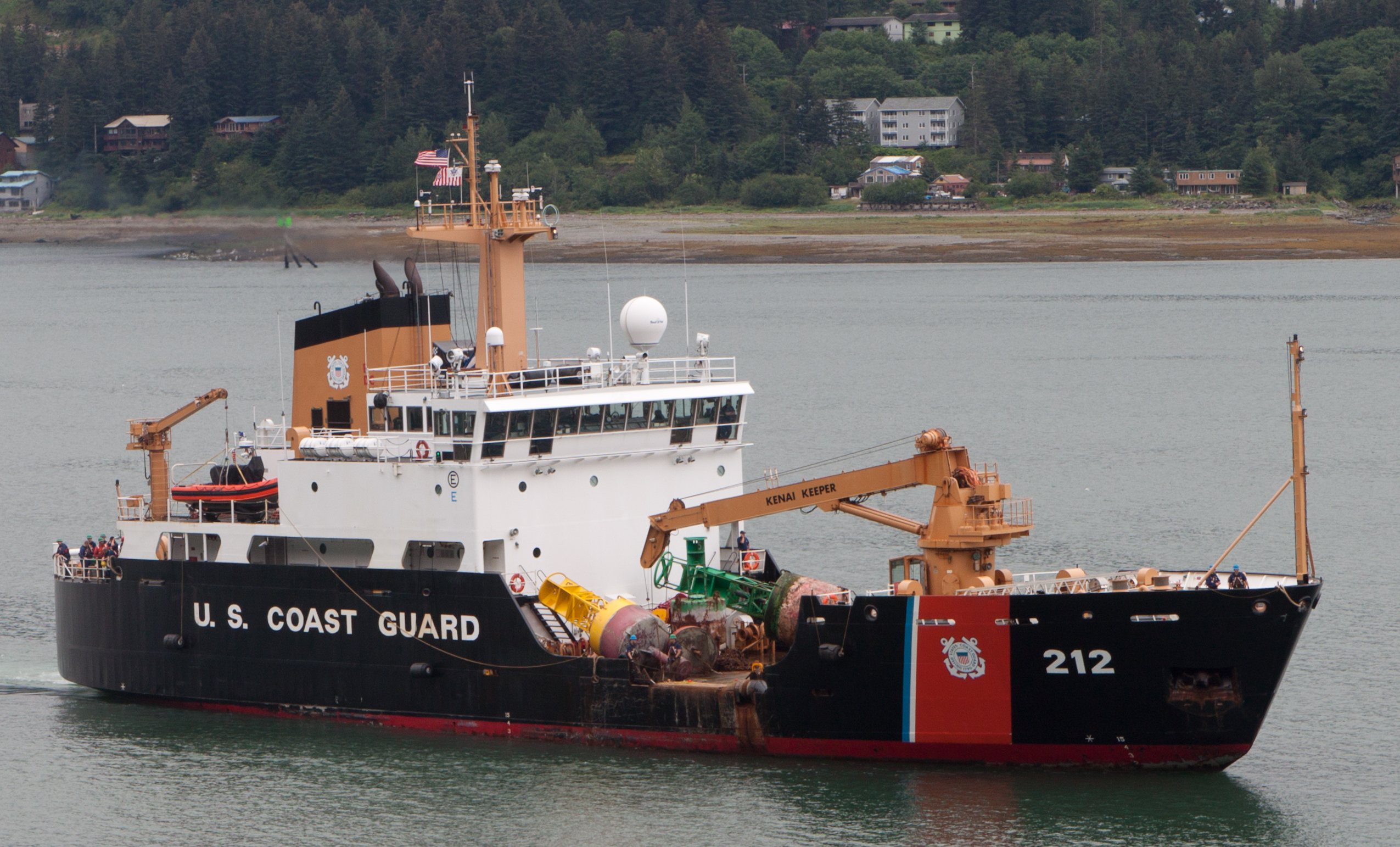
- USCGC Hickory (WLB-212)

History

United States
- Commissioned: 2003
- Home port: Santa Rita, Guam
- Identification: IMO number: 9259965; MMSI number: 369916000; Callsign: NAZJ
- Nickname(s): Bull of the Pacific (previously Bull of the North)
- Status: in active service
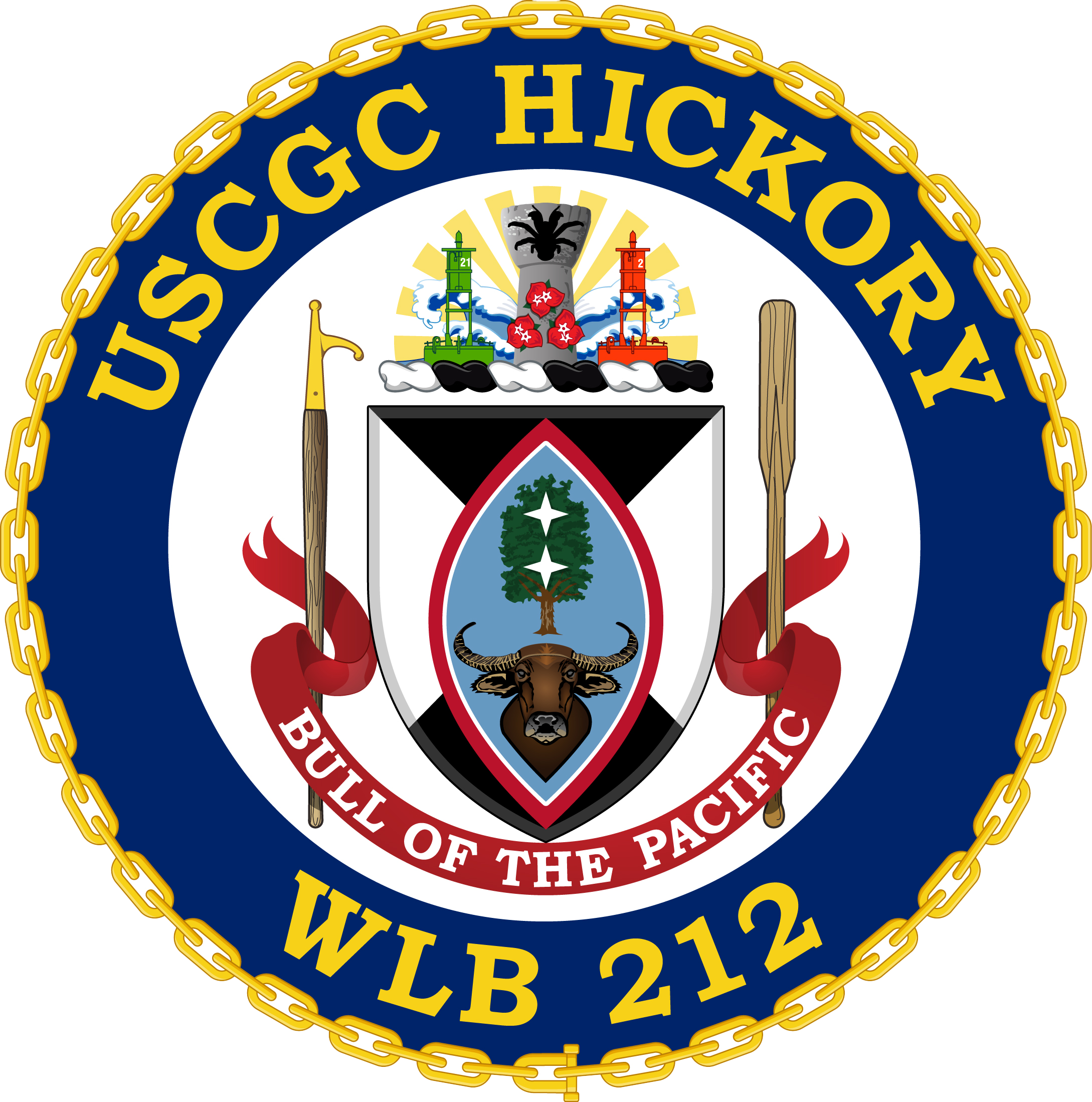
- Badge

General characteristics
- Displacement: 2,000 long tons (2,000 t) full load
- Length: 225 ft (69 m)
- Beam: 46 ft (14 m)
- Draft: 13 ft (4.0 m)
- Propulsion: 2 × Caterpillar 3608 engines; Marine Engines; 3,100 shp (2,300 kW)
- Speed: 15 kn (28 km/h; 17 mph) at full load displacement; (80% rated power)
- Range: 6,000 nmi (11,000 km; 6,900 mi) at 12 kn (22 km/h; 14 mph)
- Complement: 7 Officers; 40 Enlisted
- Armament: 2 x .50 caliber machine guns

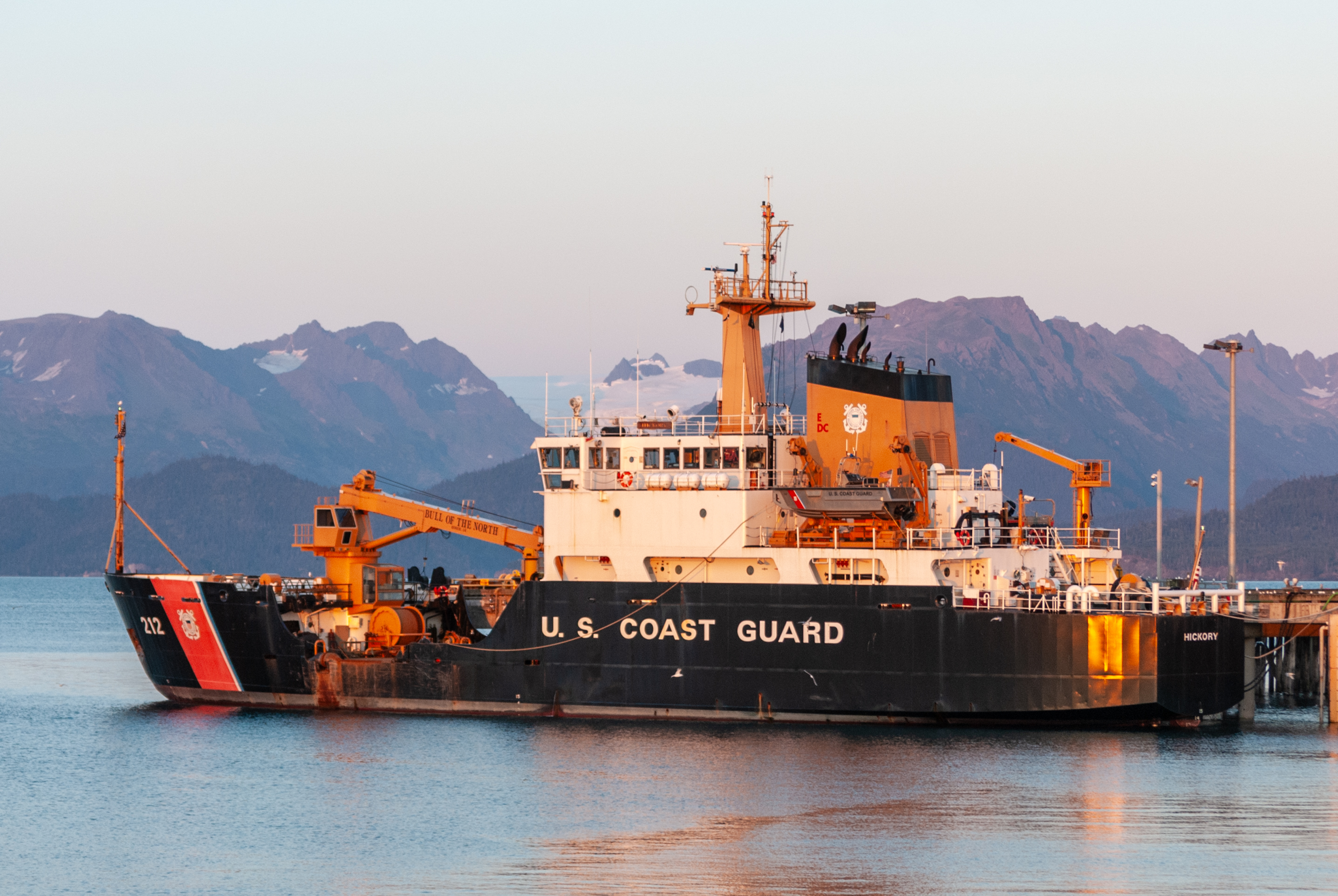
USCGC cutter, HICKORY WLB-21 in Homer, Alaska

The USCGC Hickory (WLB-212) is a United States Coast Guard seagoing buoy tender, home-ported at Apra Harbor, Guam. The Hickory serves multiple missions, including aids to navigation, search and rescue, maritime law enforcement, marine environmental protection and homeland security.

The Hickory was away from Guam for an extensive and lengthy modernization at the Coast Guard Yard in Baltimore, Maryland. It returned on 14 January 2026.

The Hickory was previously known as "The Kenai Keeper" and "Bull of the North" when its home port was Homer, Alaska, before assuming its current moniker "Bull of the Pacific"
