= USCGC Oak =

U.S. Coast Guard seagoing buoy tender

USCGC Oak (WLB 211)
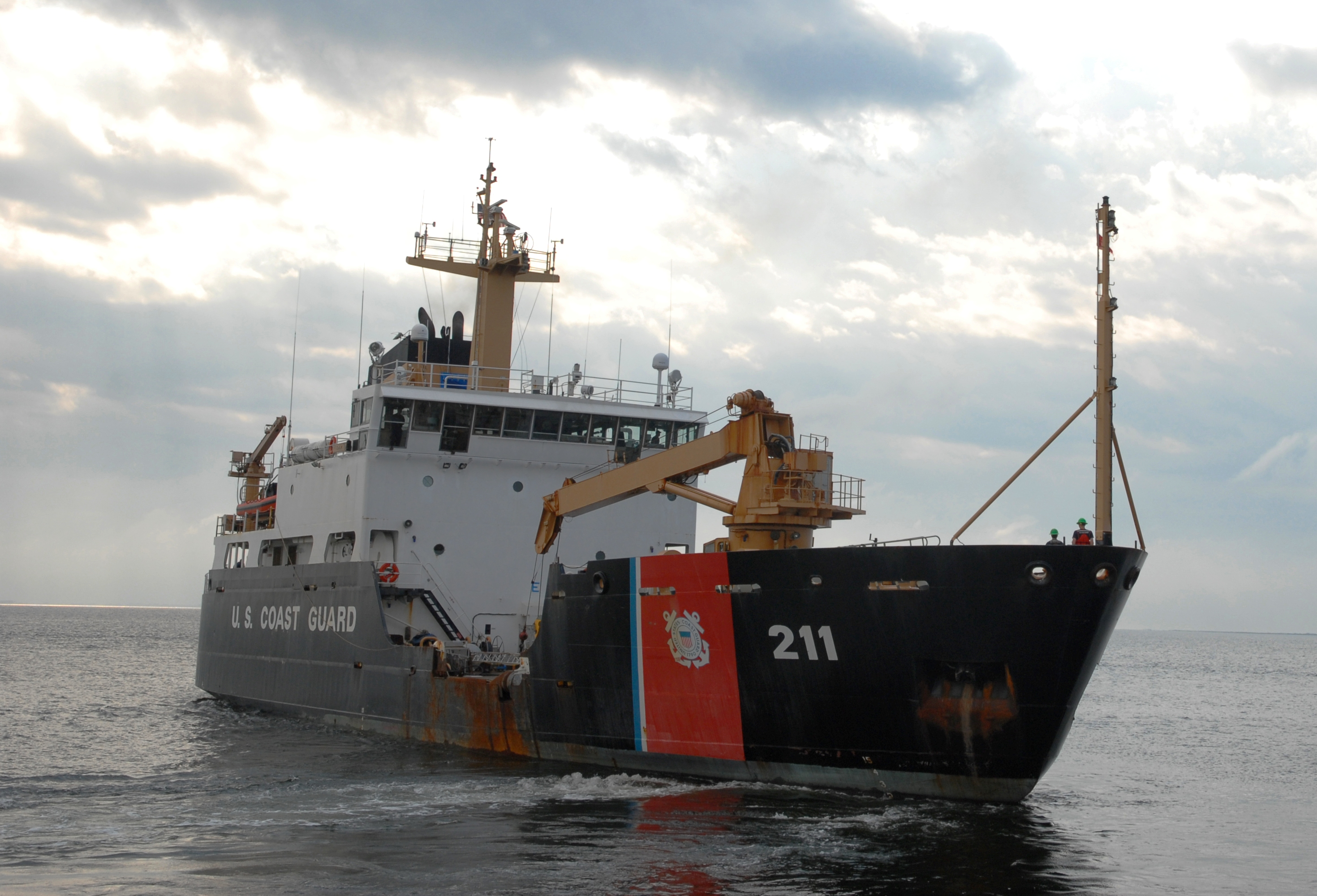
- USCGC Oak underway at sea in May 2010.

History

United States
- Name: USCGC Oak (WLB 211)
- Namesake: Oak tree
- Builder: Marinette Marine Corporation, Marinette, Wisconsin, U.S.
- Laid down: 30 July 2001
- Launched: 26 January 2002
- Commissioned: 7 March 2003
- Home port: Newport, Rhode Island
- Identification: IMO number: 9259953; MMSI number: 369906000; Callsign: NAXQ
- Status: in active service
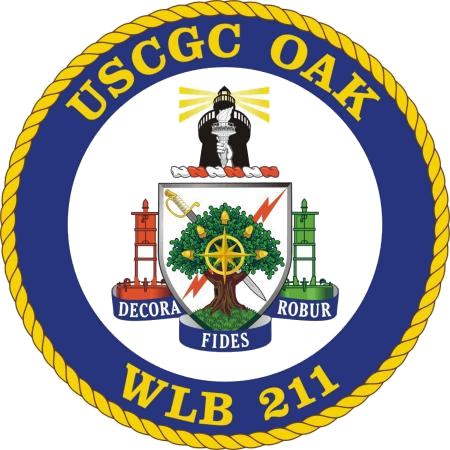
- Badge

General characteristics
- Class & type: Juniper-class seagoing buoy tender
- Displacement: 2,000 long tons (2,000 t) full load
- Length: 225 ft (69 m)
- Beam: 46 ft (14 m)
- Draft: 13 ft (4.0 m)
- Propulsion: 2 × Caterpillar 3608 diesel; marine engines; 3,100 shp (2,300 kW)
- Speed: 15 kn (28 km/h; 17 mph) at full load displacement; (80% rated power)
- Range: 6,000 nmi (11,000 km; 6,900 mi) at 12 kn (22 km/h; 14 mph)
- Complement: 7 officers, 35 enlisted
- Armament: 2 x .50 caliber heavy machine guns

The U.S. Coast Guard Cutter Oak (WLB 211) is a United States Coast Guard seagoing buoy tender; the second of her name and the eleventh of the Juniper class. Home ported in Newport, Rhode Island the "Maine Responder" maintains Aids to Navigation (ATON) along the rugged New England coastline, promoting economic security through navigation safety of the Marine Transportation System. A multi-mission platform, the cutter can also support search & rescue, domestic icebreaking, living marine resources maritime law enforcement, environmental protection, national defense and homeland security missions. The cutter occasionally assists with maintenance support of the National Oceanic and Atmospheric Administration (NOAA) National Data Buoy Center's offshore weather buoys.

== Construction and characteristics ==
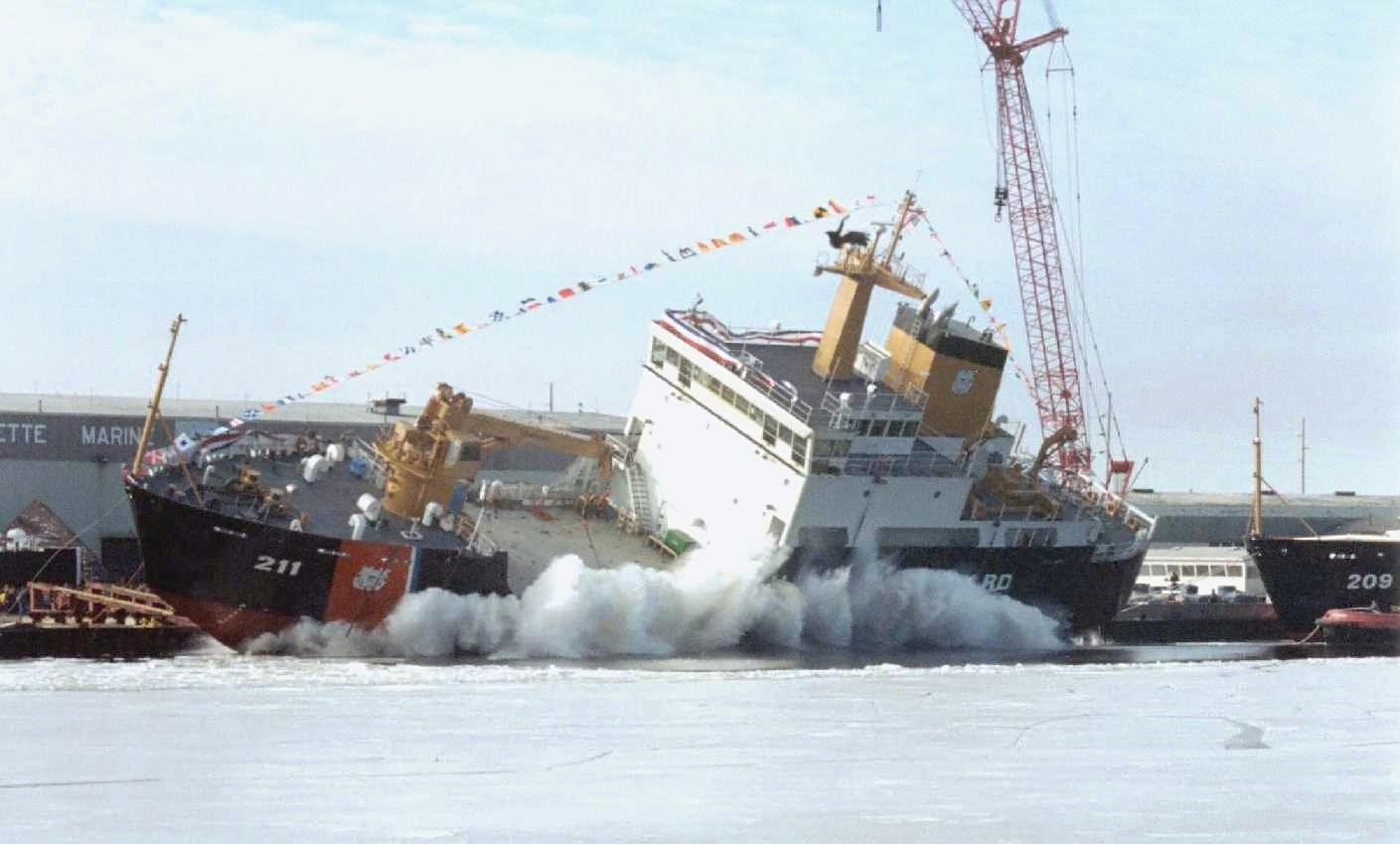
USCGC Oak being launched in January 2002.

USCGC Oak was built by the Marinette Marine Corporation in Wisconsin, launched on 26 January 2002 and commissioned in March 2003. She has a length of 225 ft (69 m), a beam of 46 ft (14 m), and a draft of 13 ft (4.0 m). Oak is propelled by two Caterpillar diesel engines rated at 3,100 horsepower, and has a top speed of 16 knots. She has a single controllable-pitch propeller, which along with bow and stern thrusters, allow the ship to be maneuvered to set buoys close offshore and in restricted waters. A dynamic global positioning system coupled with machinery plant controls and a chart display and information system allow station-keeping of the ship with an accuracy of within five meters of the planned position without human intervention. The cutter has a 2,875 square foot buoy deck area with a crane that is used for servicing large ocean buoys.

== Mission ==
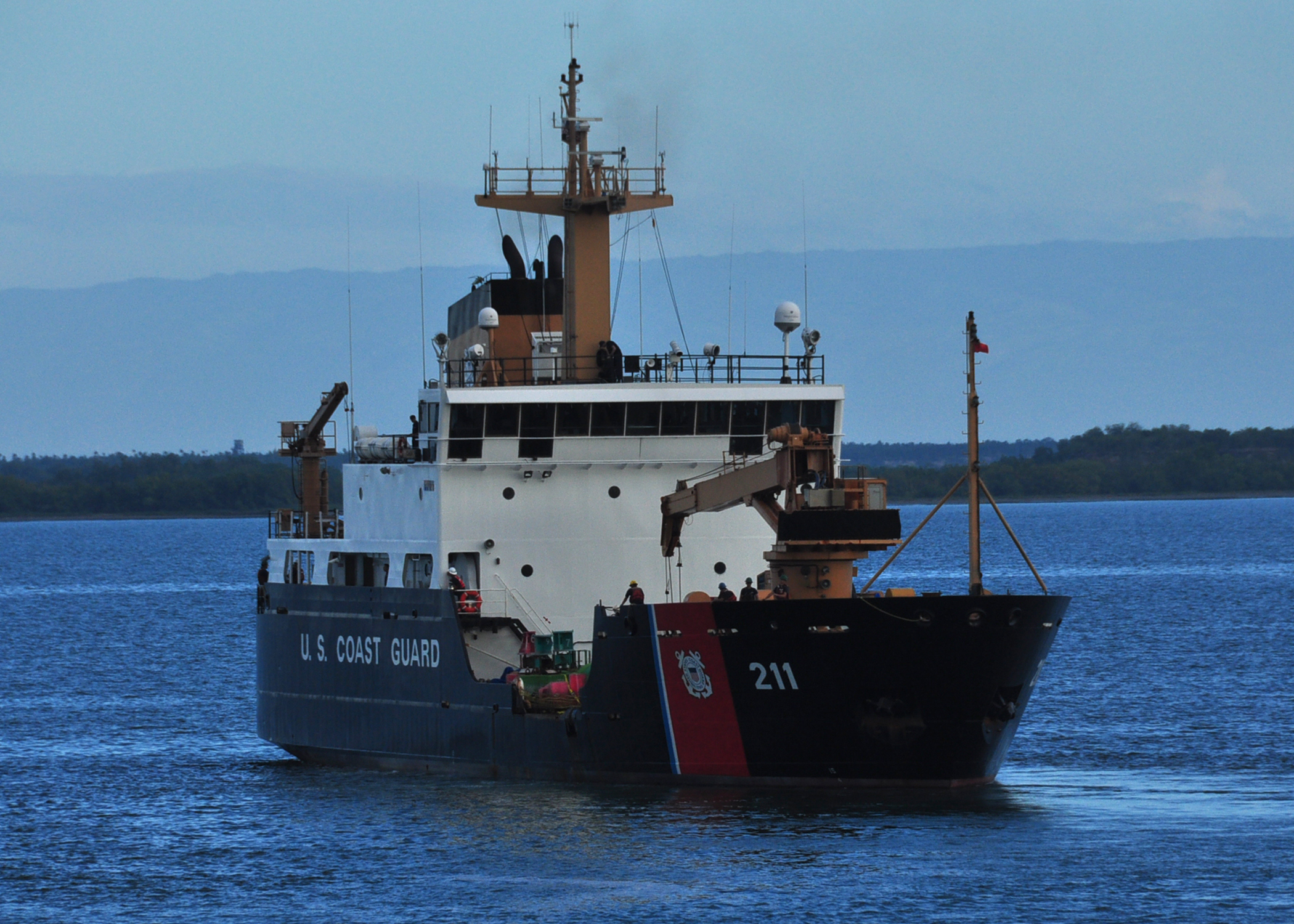
USCGC Oak sailing through Cuban waters in October 2011.

USCGC Oak has an area of responsibility within the First Coast Guard District which covers the northeast United States, up to the Canadian border. While her primary mission is servicing aids-to-navigation (ATON), the ship can also support search & rescue, domestic icebreaking, living marine resources maritime law enforcement, environmental protection, national defense and homeland security missions. The crew also assists the National Oceanic & Atmospheric Administration (NOAA) National Data Buoy Center maintain offshore weather buoys critical to mariner safety at sea. Oak has an icebreaking capability of 14 in (0.36 m) at 3 knots and 3 ft (0.91 m) backing and ramming.

== History ==
The keel for the Oak was laid on 30 July 2001 at Marinette Marine Corporation in Marinette, Wisconsin. Oak was launched on 26 January 2002. The ship's sponsor was Mrs. Billye Brown, wife of Congressman Henry E. Brown (R-SC). Initially home ported in Charleston, South Carolina, Oak was the first Coast Guard cutter to be commissioned following the creation of the Department of Homeland Security. Oak was also the first to complete a 16 month mid-life maintenance availability and homeport shift, moving to Newport in November 2016.

== See also ==
- USCG seagoing buoy tender

== Notes ==
Citations

References used

- Braesch, Connie. "First Caribbean drug sub bust". Coast Guard Compass: Official Blog of the U.S. Coast Guard. U. S. Coast Guard. Archived from the original on 18 April 2014.
- Thrower, Anne. "Images: Gulf Coast oil spill". Navy Media Content Services. Defense Video & Imagery Distribution System.
- "225-foot Seagoing Buoy Tender (WLB)". Cutters, Craft & U.S. Coast Guard-Manned Army & Navy Vessels. U.S. Coast Guard Historian's Office.
- "CGC Oak (WLB-211)". U.S. Coast Guard website.
- "Coast Guard Continues Haiti Response Efforts". U.S. Coast Guard Atlantic Area. Defense Video & Imagery Distribution System. 15 January 2010.
- "Manitowoc's Marine Group Launches Coast Guard Cutter". Investor Relations Press Releases. Manitowoc Marine Group. 30 January 2002. Archived from the original on 16 October 2006.
- "Marinette Marine Corp., Marinette WI". Index to U.S. Shipbuilders and Boatbuilders. shipbuildinghistory.com website. Archived from the original on 7 December 2011.
- "Oak Missions". CGC Oak (WLB-211). U.S. Coast Guard.
- "Violence in Haiti Hindering Aid Work". CBS News. 17 January 2010.
