= USCGC Sweetgum =

Mesquite-class tender of the United States Coast Guard

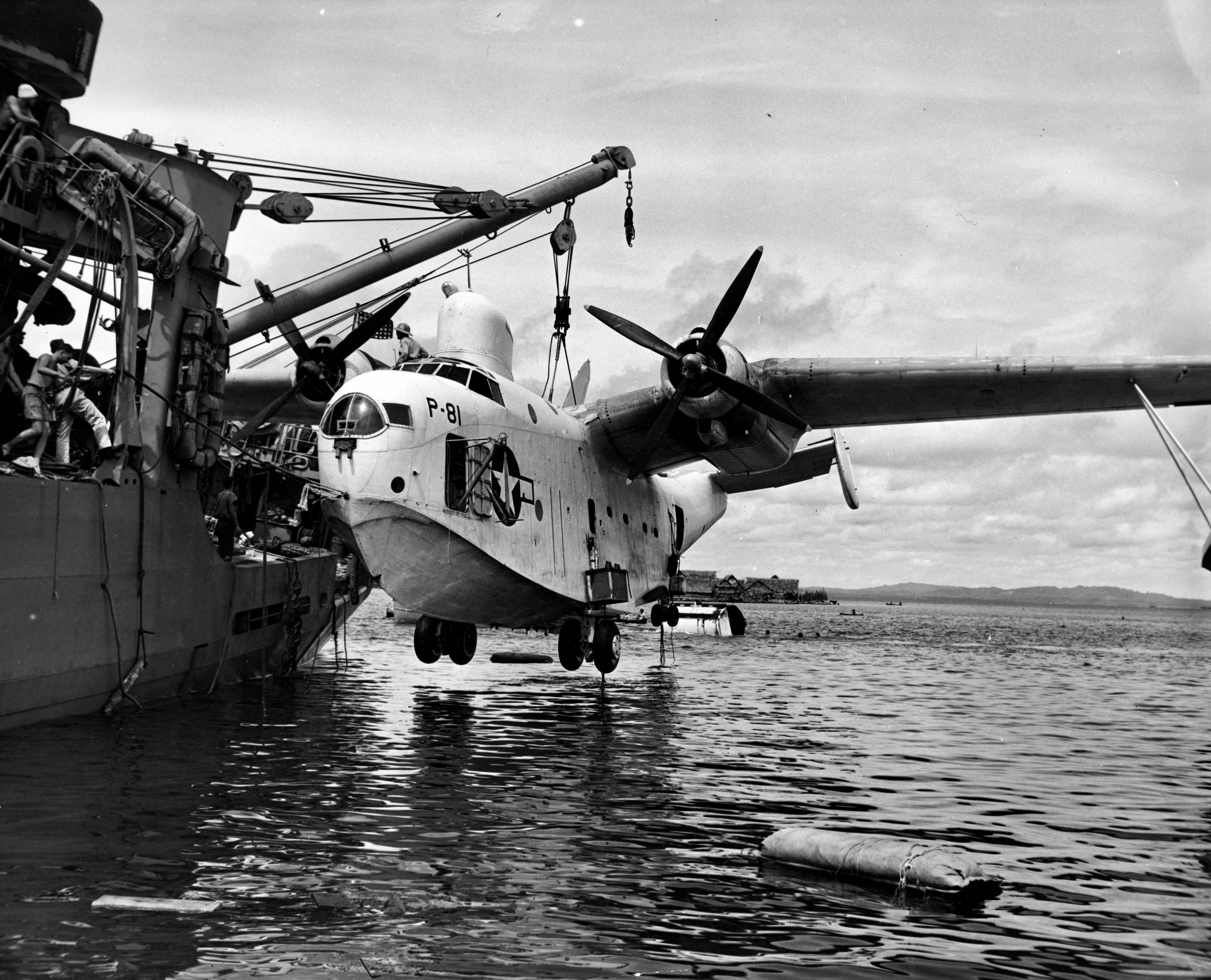
- USCGC Sweetgum hoisting a Martin PBM Mariner

History

United States
- Name: Sweetgum
- Namesake: Sweetgum
- Builder: Marine Iron and Shipbuilding Corp.
- Cost: $871,619
- Laid down: 21 February 1943
- Launched: 15 April 1943
- Commissioned: 20 November 1943
- Decommissioned: 2 February 1990
- Recommissioned: 10 January 1992
- Decommissioned: 15 February 2002
- Reclassified: WLB-309, 1965
- Home port: Miami (1943-1946); Mayport (1946-1990); Mobile (1992-2002)
- Identification: Callsign: NRQW; Hull number: WAGL-309
- Honors and awards: See Awards
- Fate: Transferred to Panama, 2002

Panama
- Name: Independencia
- Namesake: Independencia
- Acquired: 2002
- Home port: Noel Rodriguez
- Identification: IMO number: 8635124; Pennant number: A-401
- Status: Active

General characteristics
- Class & type: Mesquite-class buoy tender
- Displacement: 935 t (920 long tons)
- Length: 180 ft (55 m)
- Beam: 37 ft (11 m)
- Draft: 12 feet (3.7 m)
- Propulsion: 2 × Cooper-Bessemer GN8 diesel engines
- Speed: 13 kn (24 km/h; 15 mph)
- Range: 8,000 nmi (15,000 km; 9,200 mi) at 13 kn (24 km/h; 15 mph)
- Complement: 6 officers and 74 enlisted
- Armament: 2 × Oerlikon 20 mm cannons; 1 × 3"/50 cal gun; Depth charges

USCGC Sweetgum (WAGL-309) was a Mesquite-class buoy tender built in 1943 and operated by the United States Coast Guard. She was later transferred to Panama as SMN Independencia (A-401). The ship was named after a North American tree of the genus Liquidambar having prickly spherical fruit clusters and fragrant sap.

== Construction and career ==
Sweetgum was laid down by the Marine Iron and Shipbuilding Corp., in Duluth, Minnesota on 21 February 1943. She was launched on 15 April 1943 and later commissioned on 20 November 1943. She was then assigned to Seventh District Miami, Florida.

=== Service in the United States Coast Guard ===
During World War II, she operated around the Panama Canal Zone. On 22 September 1944, she hoisted a US Navy Martin PBM Mariner onto the ship, from the which grounded on a coral reef of Carti Village, Gulf of San Blas, Panama. The ship was reassigned to Mayport, Florida in September 1946.

In September 1955, the ship evacuated the population of Florida after 1955 Atlantic hurricane season. She transported 43 tons of marijuana that had been seized in the Bahamas to Miami.

In 1965, she was re-designated to WLB-309. In August and September 1967, she was part of a research effort to determine the pollution hazard posed by the almost one hundred oil tankers sunk near the U.S. coast during World War II.

Sweetgum took part in the salvaging of the remains of the 1986 Space Shuttle Challenger disaster that were scattered in the sea after shuttle exploded 75 seconds after liftoff on 28 January 1986. The ship features a long-reach mechanical arm that allows it to pick up and place objects from the ship's deck out to sea. That was the reason why they used it in the work of the Challenger.

The Sweetgum was decommissioned on 2 February 1990 but was recommissioned again on 10 January 1992 and deployed to Mobile, Alabama.

=== Service in the Panamanian National Navy ===
On 15 February 2002, Sweetgum was put out of service and sold to Panama as SMN Independencia (A-401). She is home-ported at Noel Rodriguez Naval Base. On 18 March 2007, it was reported that the ship would undergo repairs that costs more than $100,000, at a shipyard in Colombia.

== Awards ==
- Coast Guard Meritorious Unit Commendation
