= USCGC Iris =

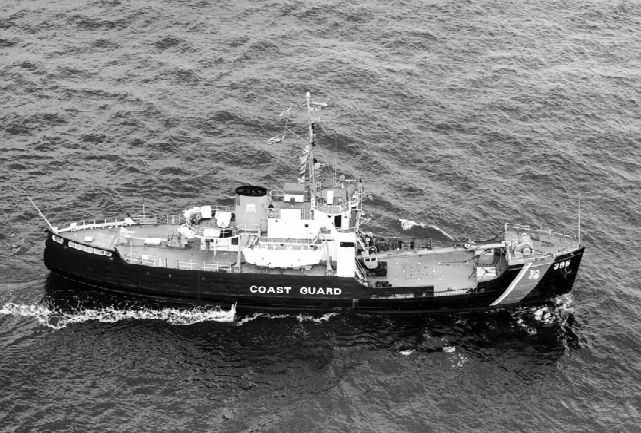
- USCGC Iris underway.

History

United States
- Name: Iris
- Builder: Zenith Dredge Corporation
- Laid down: 10 December 1943
- Launched: 18 May 1944
- Commissioned: 11 August 1944
- Decommissioned: 20 June 1995
- Fate: Transferred to Maritime Administration 8 August 1997.
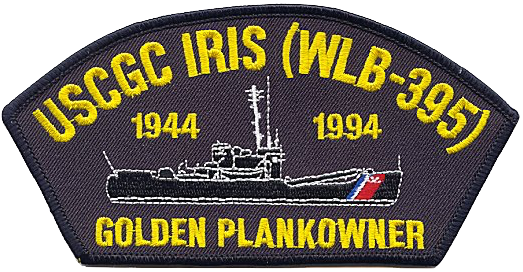
- Badge

General characteristics
- Class & type: Iris-class buoy tender
- Displacement: 935 long tons (950 t)
- Length: 180 ft (55 m)
- Beam: 47 ft 1 in (14.35 m)
- Draft: 12 ft (3.7 m)
- Propulsion: 1 × electric motor connected to 2 Westinghouse generators driven by 2 Cooper Bessemer-type GND-8, 4-cycle diesels; single screw
- Speed: 8.3 kn (15.4 km/h; 9.6 mph) cruising; 13 kn (24 km/h; 15 mph) maximum
- Complement: 6 officers; 74 enlisted
- Armament: 1 × 3 inch gun; 2 × 20 mm/80; 2 × depth charge tracks; 2 × Mousetraps; 4 × Y-guns

The USCGC Iris (WLB-395) was a Iris-class buoy tender belonging to the United States Coast Guard launched on 18 May 1944 and commissioned on 11 August 1944.

== Design ==
The Iris-class buoy tenders were constructed after the Mesquite-class buoy tenders. Iris cost $926,446 to construct and had an overall length of 180 feet (55 m). She had a beam of 37 feet (11 m) and a draft of up to 12 feet (3.7 m) at the time of construction, although this was increased to 14 feet 7 inches (4.45 m) in 1966. She initially had a displacement of 935 long tons (950 t; 1,047 short tons); this was increased to 1,026 long tons (1,042 t; 1,149 short tons) in 1966. She was powered by one electric motor. This was connected up to two Westinghouse generators which were driven by two CooperBessemer GND-8 four-cycle diesel engines. She had a single screw.

The Iris-class buoy tenders had maximum sustained speeds of 13 knots (24 km/h; 15 mph), although this diminished to around 11.9 knots (22.0 km/h; 13.7 mph) in 1966. For economic and effective operation, they had to initially operate at 8.3 knots (15.4 km/h; 9.6 mph), although this increased to 8.5 knots (15.7 km/h; 9.8 mph) in 1966. The ships had a complement of six officers and seventy-four crew members in 1945; this decreased to two warrants, four officers, and forty-seven men in 1966. They were fitted with a SL1 radar system and QBE-3A sonar system in 1945. Their armament consisted of one 3"/50 caliber gun, two 20 mm/80 guns, two Mousetraps, two depth charge tracks, and four Y-guns in 1945; these were removed in 1966.

== Career ==
International radio call sign of USCGC Iris (WLB-395)
November	Oscar	Delta	November

Upon receiving her commission, Iris was assigned to the 8th Coast Guard District and homeported in Galveston, Texas, where she was used for general ATON duties through the end of the war. In April 1947, she assisted with evacuating the injured from the Texas City disaster in which SS Grandcamp carrying ammonium nitrate exploded. After assisting with evacuations, Iris returned to the scene to assist with fighting the numerous fires that had spawned. In April 1989, she responded out to the Exxon Valdez oil spill and assisted with the clean up of Prince William Sound. In 1997, she was transferred to the Maritime Administration.

== See also ==
- List of United States Coast Guard cutters
