= MV S.E. Graham =

MV S.E. Graham was an oil tanker that was built in 1943 and operated by the Graham Company until her loss in 1958. She was 250 feet (76 m) in length and measured 1,591 gross tons.

On the morning of August 7, 1958, S.E. Graham was inbound to Providence, Rhode Island at the mouth of the Narragansett Bay near Rose Island with a load of 650,000 US gallons (2,500,000 L) of gasoline when she collided in heavy fog with SS Gulfoil, which was outbound in ballast when she rammed S.E. Graham on her port bow. The collision triggered a fire that engulfed both ships until they drifted apart and grounded separately. On SS Gulfoil, 18 of the crew were burned; 17 bodies were recovered, while one was listed as missing—while all of S.E. Graham's crew survived. Survivors were retrieved by the Coast Guard cutter Laurel and various Coast Guard and Navy small craft.

S.E. Graham burned for most of the day, and was declared a total loss, while Gulfoil was salvaged and eventually rebuilt for service on the Great Lakes.
