= USCGC Sagebrush =

Iris class seagoing buoy tender

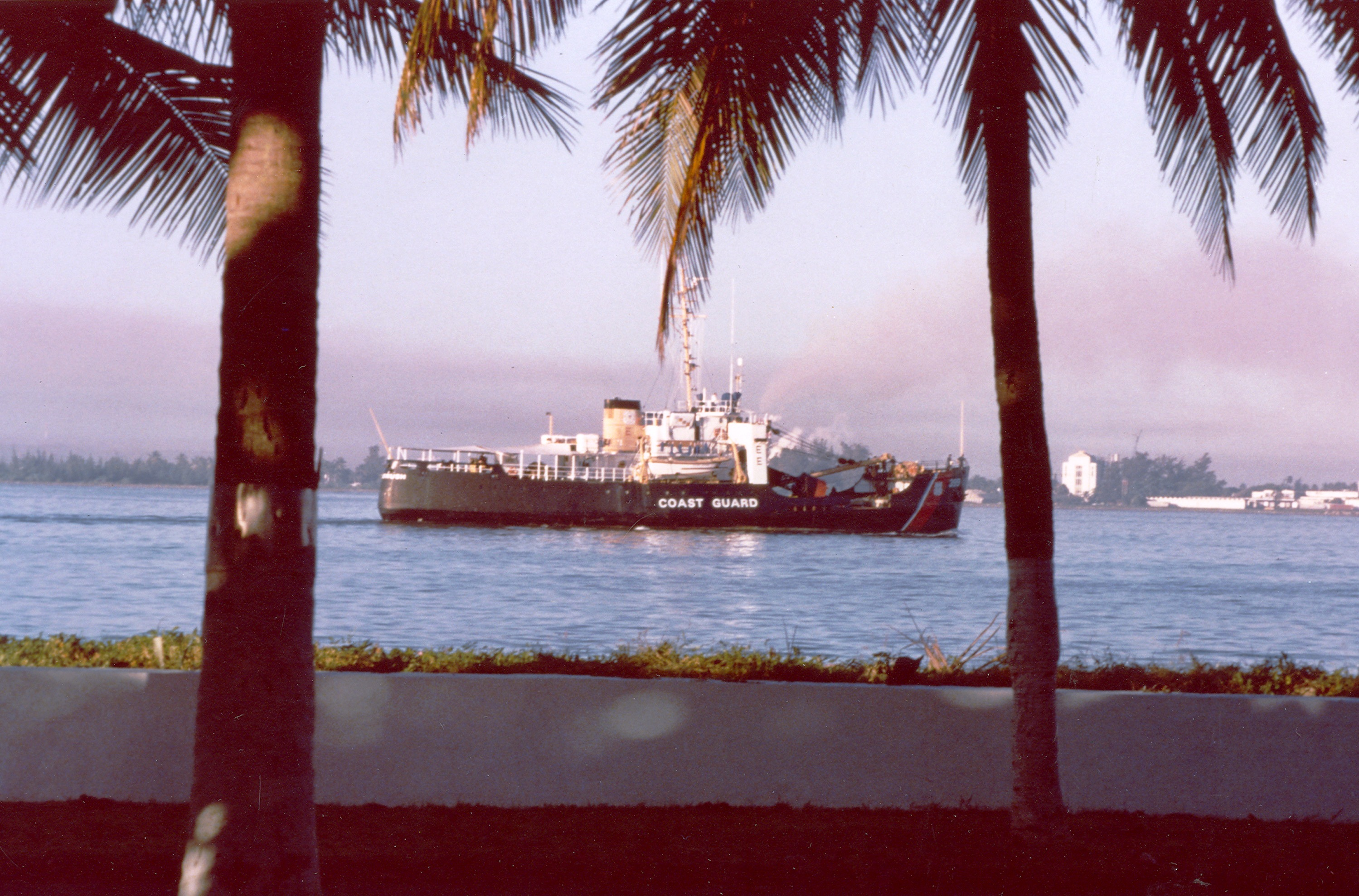

History

United States
- Name: USCGC Sagebrush (WLB-399)
- Builder: Zenith Dredge Corporation, Duluth, Minnesota
- Cost: $925,134
- Yard number: CG-170
- Laid down: 15 July 1943
- Launched: 30 September 1943
- Commissioned: 1 April 1944
- Decommissioned: 26 April 1988
- Honors and awards: 4 × USCG Unit Commendations (1982, 1984(2), 1985); Coast Guard Academy Alumni Foundation Award (1985)
- Fate: Scuttled, later than 6 July 1988

General characteristics (1945)
- Class & type: "C" (or Iris) class USCG seagoing buoy tender
- Displacement: 935 long tons (950 t)
- Length: 180 ft (55 m) o/a
- Beam: 37 ft (11 m)
- Draft: 12 ft (3.7 m)
- Propulsion: Diesel-electric; 2 × Cooper-Bessemer-type GND-8 4-cycle diesel engines; 2 × Westinghouse generators; 1 × Electric motor; Single screw
- Speed: 13 knots (24 km/h; 15 mph)
- Complement: 80 (6 officers, 74 men)
- Sensors & processing systems: SL1 radar; QBE-3A sonar
- Armament: 1 × 3"/50 caliber gun; 2 × 20 mm/80 guns; 2 × Mousetrap ASWs; 4 × Y-gun depth charge projectors; 2 × Depth charge tracks

USCGC Sagebrush (WLB-399) was a 180-foot (55 m) USCG seagoing buoy tender. An Iris class vessel, she was built by Zenith Dredge Corporation. On 15 July 1943 the keel was laid; she was launched on 30 September 1943 and commissioned on 1 April 1944. She was decommissioned on 26 April 1988 and scuttled at some point after 6 July 1988.

== Ship history ==
Sagebrush was built by the Zenith Dredge Corporation of Duluth, Minnesota during World War II. The original cost for the hull and machinery was $925,134. From March to April 1944 she acted as an icebreaker on the Great Lakes. She spent the rest of her service life home-ported in San Juan, Puerto Rico, from which she maintained floating and fixed aids-to-navigation (AtoN) in Puerto Rico, the U.S. Virgin Islands, and surrounding waters.

In addition to her main duties, she performed law enforcement, Search-and-Rescue (SAR), drug and illegal alien interdiction patrols, and provided logistical services in her area of operations. She also made occasional "show the flag" visits to various independent and colonial islands around the Leeward Islands to foster international familiarity and cooperation in the region.

She served as OSC (On Scene Commander) for the search and rescue mission following the crash of the aircraft carrying Roberto Clemente and his supplies for Managua earthquake victims in January 1973. Sagebrush located the wreckage of the plane in 129 feet of water in the Atlantic Ocean north of Puerto Rico, and recovered the pilot's body, but the body of Clemente was never found. In 1974, her crew, under then Captain LCDR Lindon Onstad, also conducted the successful rescue of four persons from an overturned cabin cruiser in the surf on the rocky north coast just west of the entrance to San Juan Harbor. Several members of the crew received personal commendations for that action.

The ship underwent a three-month Service Life Extension & Rehabilitation yard maintenance program at the United States Coast Guard Yard in Curtis Bay, Maryland, in the spring of 1973. She then returned to San Juan and worked out her service career there. In 1978 the Sagebrush ran aground on the reef north of the channel that is charted south of the island of Culebra in the Spanish Virgins East of Puerto Rico, a narrow strait of water with numerous corral outcroppings located between Puerto Rico and St. Thomas. The ship was on a return trip to San Juan after a patrol. In 1978 on its return to Puerto Rico from a yard period in Jacksonville, Florida, to repair the damage done in the grounding, the ship captured the M/V Heidi off the Florida East coast. The Heidi carried a record payload of marijuana in excess of 100 tons. In April 1988, she was decommissioned, then salvaged by a group who intended to use her as part of a man-made reef off the Georgia coast between St. Simons Island and Savannah. She was scuttled off of St. Catherines Island, Georgia on 28 April 1988.

The helm from Sagebrush is on display in the National Aids to Navigation Museum in Canfield Hall at the Coast Guard's Training Center Yorktown.

== Gallery ==
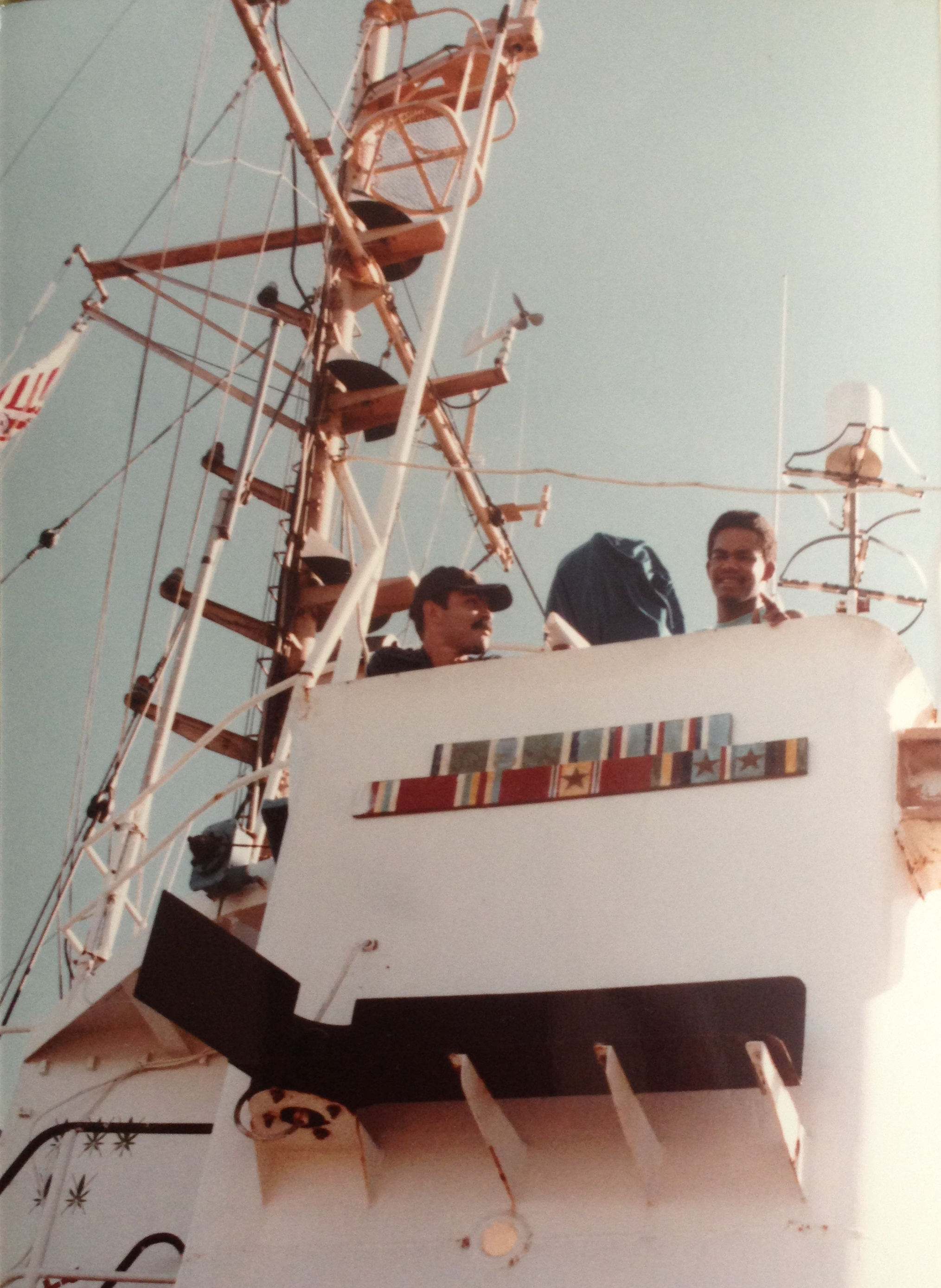
Bridge of Sagebrush, 1984

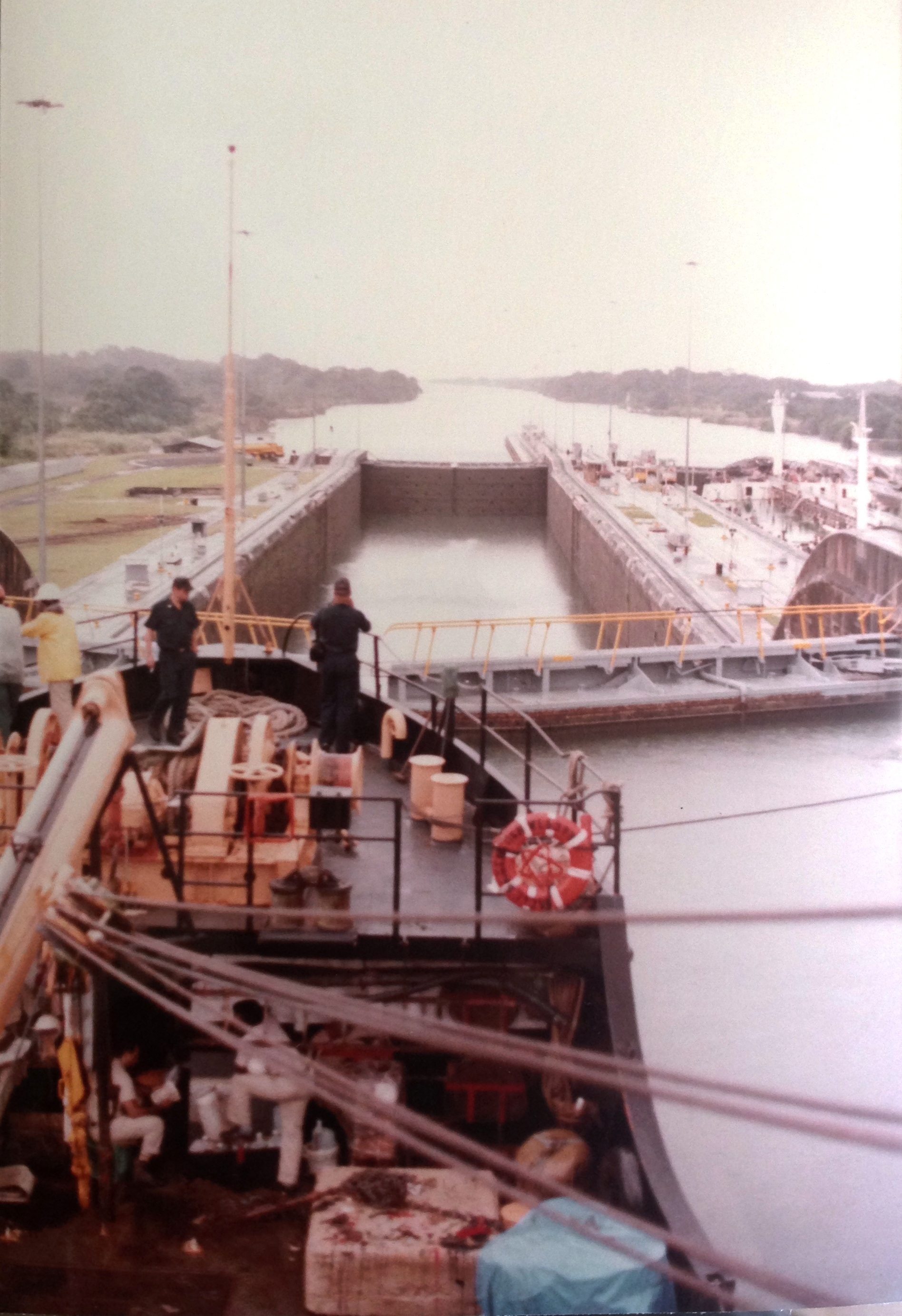
Sagebrush in the Panama Canal, 1984

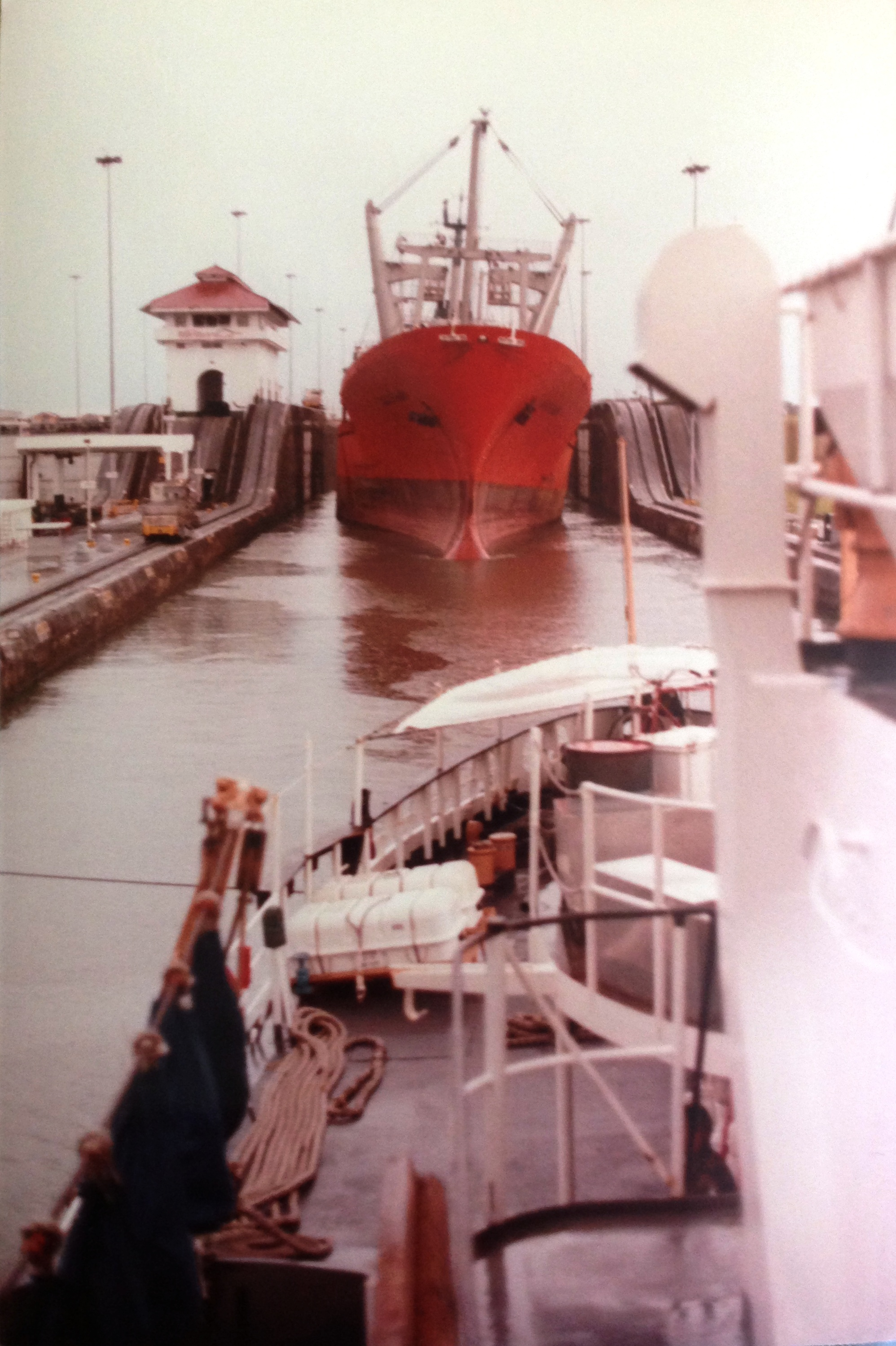
View from the aft of Sagebrush in the Panama Canal, 1984

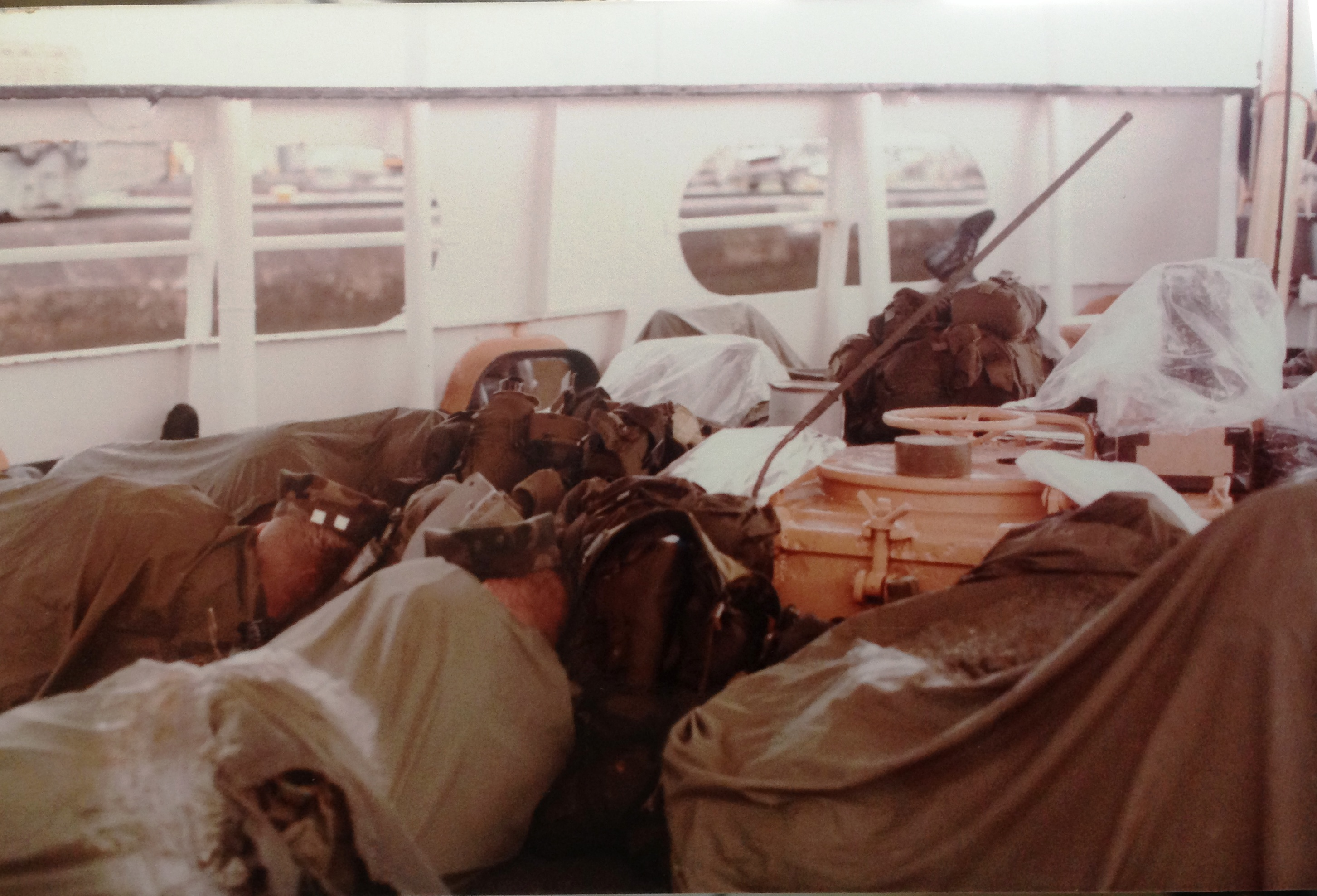
Sleeping U.S. Marines aboard Sagebrush in the Panama Canal, 1984
