= USCGC Hornbeam =

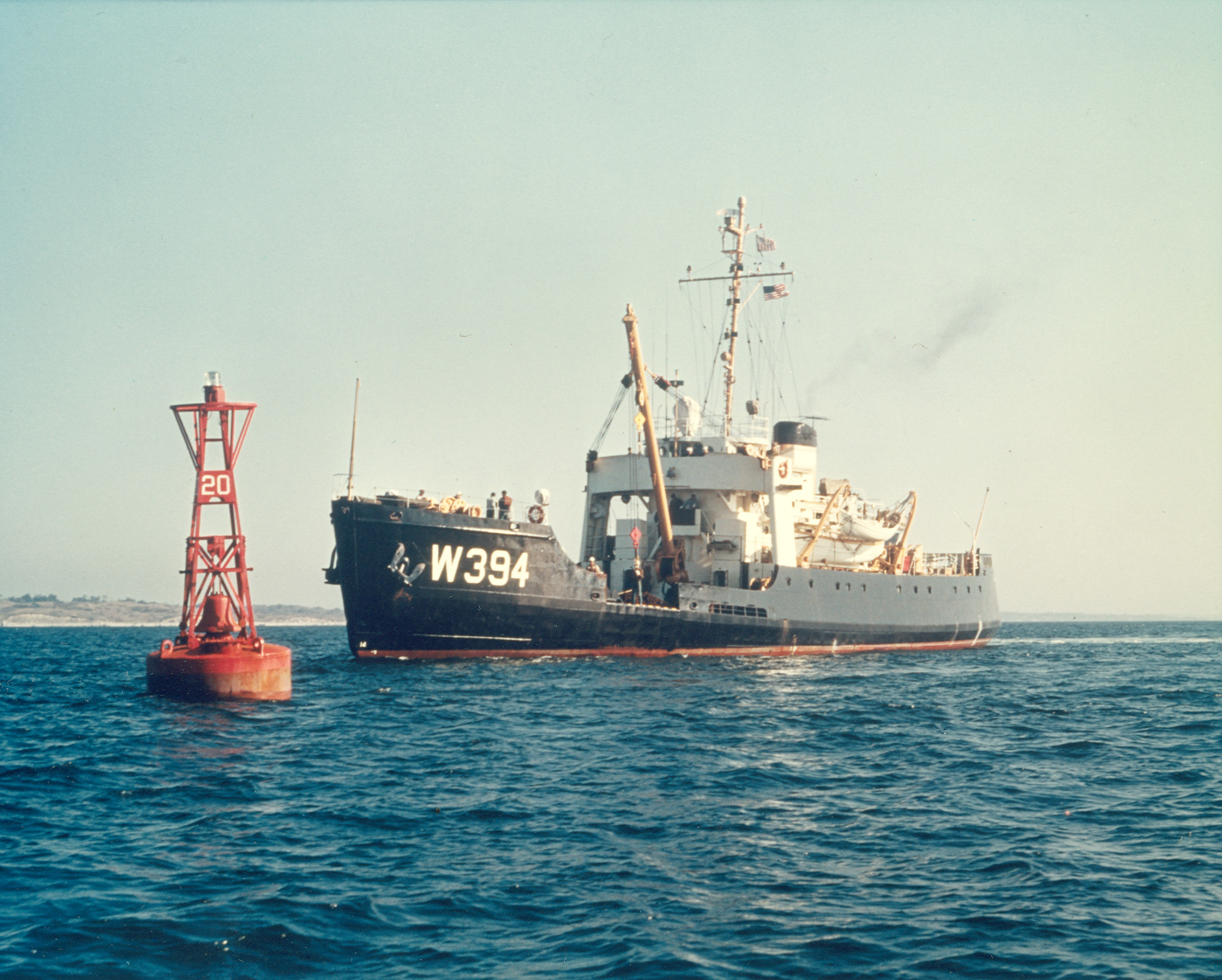
- USCGC Hornbeam underway.

History

United States
- Name: Hornbeam
- Builder: Marine and Iron Shipbuilding Corporation
- Laid down: 19 June 1943
- Launched: 14 August 1943
- Commissioned: 14 April 1944
- Decommissioned: 30 September 1999
- Identification: IMO number: 8660624
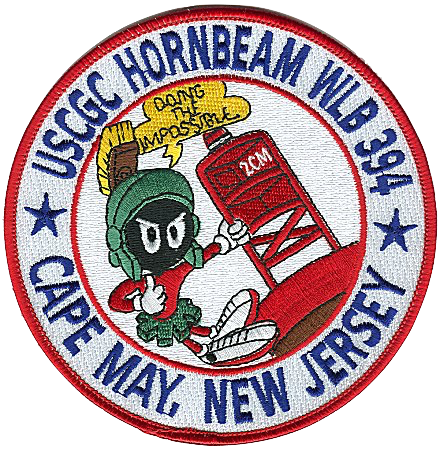
- Badge

General characteristics
- Class & type: Iris-class buoy tender
- Displacement: 935 long tons (950 t)
- Length: 180 ft (55 m)
- Beam: 47 ft 1 in (14.35 m)
- Draft: 12 ft (3.7 m)
- Propulsion: 1 × electric motor connected to 2 Westinghouse generators driven by 2 Cooper Bessemer-type GND-8, 4-cycle diesels; single screw
- Speed: 8.3 kn (15.4 km/h; 9.6 mph) cruising; 13 kn (24 km/h; 15 mph) maximum
- Complement: 6 officers; 74 enlisted
- Armament: 1 × 3 inch gun; 2 × 20 mm/80; 2 × depth charge tracks; 2 × Mousetraps; 4 × Y-guns

The USCGC Hornbeam (WLB-394) was an Iris-class buoy tender belonging to the United States Coast Guard launched on 14 August 1943 and commissioned on 14 April 1944.

== Design ==
The Iris-class buoy tenders were constructed after the Mesquite-class buoy tenders. Hornbeam cost $864,296 to construct and had an overall length of 180 feet (55 m). She had a beam of 37 feet (11 m) and a draft of up to 12 feet (3.7 m) at the time of construction, although this was increased to 14 feet 7 inches (4.45 m) in 1966. She initially had a displacement of 935 long tons (950 t; 1,047 short tons); this was increased to 1,026 long tons (1,042 t; 1,149 short tons) in 1966. She was powered by one electric motor. This was connected up to two Westinghouse generators which were driven by two Cooper Bessemer GND-8 four-cycle diesel engines. She had a single screw.

The Iris-class buoy tenders had maximum sustained speeds of 13 knots (24 km/h; 15 mph), although this diminished to around 11.9 knots (22.0 km/h; 13.7 mph) in 1966. For economic and effective operation, they had to initially operate at 8.3 knots (15.4 km/h; 9.6 mph), although this increased to 8.5 knots (15.7 km/h; 9.8 mph) in 1966. The ships had a complement of six officers and seventy-four crew members in 1945; this decreased to two warrants, four officers, and forty-seven men in 1966. They were fitted with a SL1 radar system and QBE-3A sonar system in 1945. Their armament consisted of one 3"/50 caliber gun, two 20 mm/80 guns, two Mousetraps, two depth charge tracks, and four Y-guns in 1945; these were removed in 1966.

== Career ==
International radio call sign of USCGC Hornbeam (WLB-394)
November	Oscar	Delta	Mike

During World War II Hornbeam initially served on the Great Lakes where she was used for ATON and ice-breaking. From August 1944, until the war's end in 1945, the cutter was assigned to the First Coast Guard District and stationed at Woods Hole. In January 1945, she assisted USCGC Nemesis (WPC-111) following Nemesis' collision with SS Felipe de Neve.

On 25 July 1956 Hornbeam participated in the rescue operations after the collision of the ocean liner Andrea Doria with the ship Stockholm.

During early 1965, she escorted the USS Atka (AGB-3), which was taking on water near New Bedford.

On 25 May, 1972 Hornbeam collided in heavy fog with a Brazilian freigher Docelago and suffered damage on the starboard bow. There were no injuries and she returned to port under her own power.

Hornbeam stayed in Woods Hole until July 1976 when she left for an overhaul at the Coast Guard Yard at Curtis Bay, MD. From 29 April 1977, Hornbeam was stationed at Cape May, NJ, and used as an Aids to Navigation Boat. In January and February 1994, Hornbeam, during a record cold spell, spent seven weeks breaking ice and installing ice buoys in the Delaware Bay and Delaware River.

She was decommissioned on 30 September 1999, and put up for sale.

== M/V Rum Cay Grace ==
In January 2009, Hornbeam was purchased by Integrated Technologies & Systems, Ltd and rechristened M/V Rum Cay Grace, getting underway in February for Rum Cay, Bahamas. Along the way, the crew spotted and salvaged a US Navy Northrop BQM-74 Chukar target drone. Rum Cay Grace transported emergency relief supplies from Miami, Florida, following the 2010 Haiti earthquake. Following her relief efforts, while anchored in Port-au-Prince, Rum Cay Grace was stolen by smugglers and abandoned near the Panama Canal. She and six other ships broke loose from their moorings and were driven onto the rocks in 2013.

== See also ==
- List of United States Coast Guard cutters
