= USCGC Cactus =

US Coast Guard seagoing buoy tender

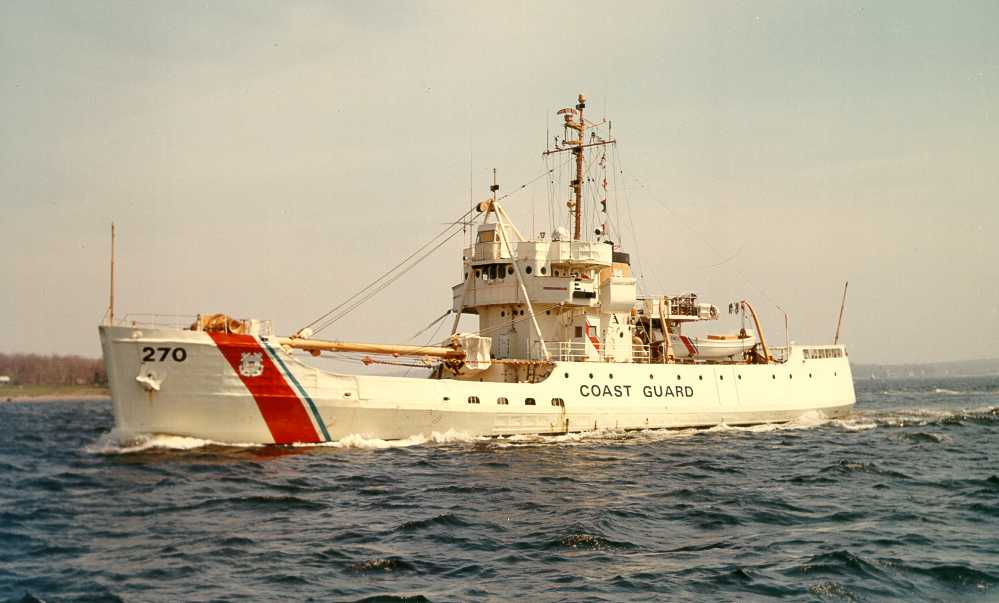

History

United States
- Builder: Marine Ironworks and Shipbuilding Corporation, Duluth, Minnesota
- Cost: $782,381
- Yard number: CG-76
- Laid down: 31 March 1941
- Launched: 25 November 1941
- Commissioned: 1 September 1942
- Decommissioned: 23 November 1971
- Identification: Call sign: NRZH
- Fate: Sold 9 October 1973; scrapped between 2008-2014

General characteristics
- Class & type: Cactus (lead ship)
- Displacement: 1,025 long tons (1,041 t)
- Length: 180 ft (55 m)
- Beam: 37 ft (11 m)
- Draft: 12 ft (3.7 m) max (1945); 14 ft 7 in (4.45 m) (1966)
- Propulsion: First refit: 1 electric motor connected to 2 Westinghouse generators driven by 2 Cooper-Bessemer type GND-8, 4 cycle diesels. 1 screw.; Second refit: 2 × General Motors EMD 645 V8 diesel engines
- Speed: 13 kn (24 km/h; 15 mph)
- Range: 8,000 nmi (15,000 km; 9,200 mi) at 13 kn (24 km/h; 15 mph)
- Complement: 6 officers, 74 men (1945); 4 officers, 2 warrants, 47 men (1966); 48 (1971)
- Sensors & processing systems: Radar: Bk (1943); SL-1 (1945) Sonar: WEA-2 (1945)
- Armament: 1941: 1 × 3 in (76 mm)/50 (single); 2 × Oerlikon 20 mm cannon/80 (single); 2 × depth charge tracks; 2 × Mousetraps; 4 × Y-guns; 1966: M2 Browning machine guns; M60 machine guns and small arms

USCGC Cactus (WLB-270) was a 180 feet (55 m) seagoing buoy tender (WLB). A Cactus-class vessel, she was built by Marine Ironworks and Shipbuilding Corporation in Duluth, Minnesota. Cactus's preliminary design was completed by the United States Lighthouse Service and the final design was produced by Marine Iron and Shipbuilding Corporation. On 31 March 1941 the keel was laid, she was launched on 25 November 1941 and commissioned on 1 September 1942. The original cost for the hull and machinery was $782,381.

Cactus is one of 39 original 180-foot seagoing buoy tenders built between 1942 and 1944. All but one of the original tenders, USCGC Ironwood (WLB-297), were built in Duluth.

Cactus was decommissioned in 1971 after running aground. Ultimately, the Coast Guard sold the damaged vessel and she was converted to a barge for use in the Pacific Northwest. Cactus was moored without permission in Tacoma, Washington, for several years and then in King County off Maury Island from 2003 to 2008. King County seized the vessel in 2008; it was moved to Ballard Shipyard, and gradually scrapped.

== Ship's history ==
USCGC Cactus was initially assigned to the First Coast Guard District in 1942 and stationed at Boston, Massachusetts. On 12 June 1943 the tender collided with MV Manasquan and sustained considerable damage. After World War II Cactus continued to serve the First District from Boston. In addition to tending aids to navigation (ATON), the cutter also performed search and rescue (SAR), icebreaking and law enforcement (LE) duties.

On 2 March 1952 Cactus provided assistance to FV Dorothy and FV Mary 20 miles south of Nantucket, MA. On 16 November 1953 Cactus fought a fire on FV Jane and FV Patricia. On 26 August 1954 Cactus assisted FV Western Pride which had grounded near Provincetown, MA. In 1957 Cactus assisted the grounded MV Franco Lisi near Salem, MA. On 10 February and 27 July 1957 Cactus fought pier fires in Boston, MA and moved a 450-foot Norwegian merchant vessel to safety away from the flames. During the night of 21–22 February 1959 Cactus assisted FV Jo-Ann.

At some point in the early 1960s CGC Cactus was retasked as an oceanographic buoy tender (WLBO-270), and was one of two WLBOs in Boston functioning as an oceanographic platform, painted white, instead of the usual black color denoting a USCG work vessel. The other white WLBO vessel was the CGC Evergreen in Boston.

During 24 to 25 January 1966 she escorted the disabled merchant vessel, MS South African Victory to Boston. On 4 February 1969 Cactus towed the disabled FV Chrisway to safety from 140 miles southeast of Cape Henry, Virginia.

In 1967, the CGC Cactus homeport was changed from Boston to Bristol, Rhode Island.

In Nov/Dec 1969 the ship sailed from Bristol with a delivery Prize Crew, to her new homeport at Tongue Point Coast Guard Base in Astoria, Oregon, in December 1969. The entire CGC Cactus crew flew from Seattle to Boston for reassignment in CCDONE.

In 1971 Cactus wrecked on the submerged portion of South Jetty at Grays Harbor, Washington. Both cargo holds were ruptured and tidal; her engine room was holed and taking on water. Her main engines were inoperative because of shaft misalignment and a damaged screw. Cactus was severely damaged and in peril of capsizing. She was successfully re-floated using air and towed to Seattle, Washington, by MS Salvage Chief, (Captain Reino Mattila, homeport Astoria, Oregon).

She was decommissioned after the 1971 incident. Sold into private hands, she eventually ended up under the ownership of David Thomsen, who bought the ship for $35,000 with plans of turning her into a floating sawmill. The conversion never occurred and the vessel languished in Tacoma's Foss Waterway until September 2003 when Thomsen was forced to move by official 30-day notice. On day 29, he used tides, wind, and a 20’ fishing boat to move Cactus to Maury Island.

The vessel sat at Maury Island for years; by 2008, it was filled with buckets of paint and epoxy, rusted steel plates, rubber hoses, PVC pipe, leaking pails of seam filler, old newspapers, mattresses, boxes of tiles, etc., as well as fuel and asbestos insulation. Cactus was pillaged for equipment in the five years between 2003 and 2008; ten-foot pieces of metal had been cut out of the deck, brass valves were removed, and holes in the hull had been plugged by cork to keep her afloat. At one point, it broke anchor and went swinging into the aquatic reserve nearby. After Thomsen called for help on a separate occasion, state authorities seized the ship and removed it to Ballard Shipyard for disposal. Budgetary constraints meant that full scrapping was only scheduled for completion in Fall 2012 as a result of a legislative lump sum allocated to the state's Derelict Vessel Removal Program.
