= USCGC Cowslip =

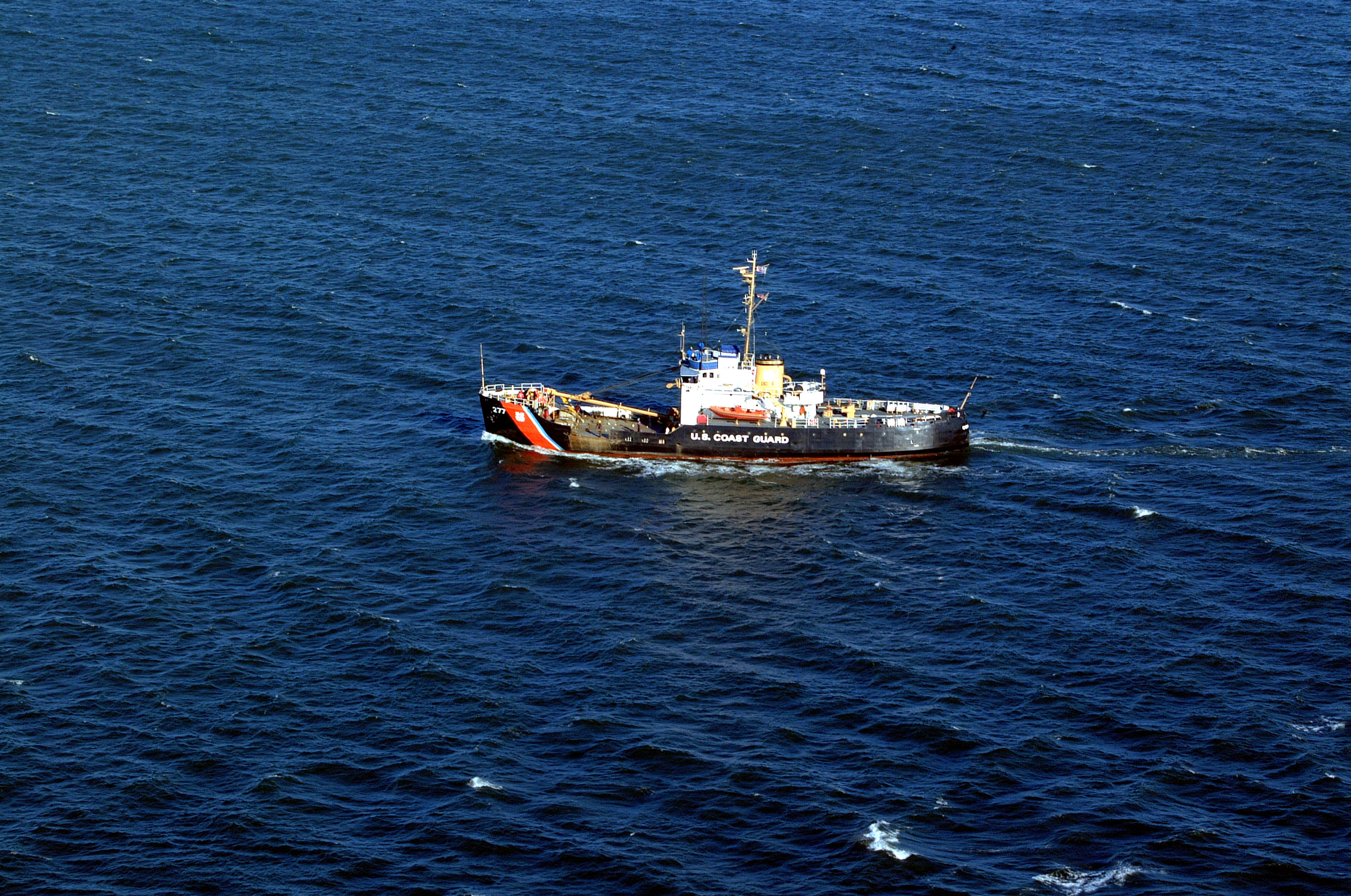
- USCGC Cowslip

History

United States
- Name: USCGC Cowslip (WLB-277)
- Builder: Marine Ironworks and Shipbuilding Corporation, Duluth, Minnesota
- Cost: $918,873
- Laid down: 16 September 1941
- Launched: 11 April 1942
- Commissioned: 17 October 1942
- Decommissioned: 1973
- Recommissioned: 1981
- Decommissioned: 2002
- Fate: Sold to Nigerian Navy and subsequently re-christened Ologbo.

Nigeria
- Name: NNS Ologbo (A 502)
- Commissioned: 2003
- Identification: IMO number: 8133243; MMSI number: 987654000; Callsign: 5NAP
- Status: In service

General characteristics
- Class & type: Cactus (Class A)
- Displacement: 1,025 tons
- Length: 180 ft (55 m)
- Beam: 37 ft (11 m)
- Propulsion: 2 × General Motors EMD 645 V8 diesel engines
- Speed: 13 kn (24 km/h; 15 mph)
- Range: 8,000 nmi (15,000 km; 9,200 mi) at 13 kn (24 km/h; 15 mph)
- Complement: 48
- Armament: Wartime: 20 mm guns, a 3 in (76 mm)/50 cannon, and depth charges.; Peacetime: None

USCGC Cowslip (WLB-277) is a 180-foot (55 m) sea going buoy tender (WLB). A Cactus-class vessel, she was built by Marine Ironworks and Shipbuilding Corporation in Duluth, Minnesota. Cowslip's preliminary design was completed by the United States Lighthouse Service and the final design was produced by Marine Iron and Shipbuilding Corporation in Duluth. On 16 September 1941 the keel was laid. She was launched on 11 April 1942 and commissioned on 17 October 1942. The original cost for the hull and machinery was $918,873.

Cowslip is one of 39 original 180-foot (55 m) seagoing buoy tenders built between 1942–1944. All but one of the original tenders, the USCGC Ironwood (WLB-297), were built in Duluth.

After commissioning, Cowslip was assigned to Boston, Massachusetts, where she served until 1944. From 1944 until 1973, it was assigned to Portland, Maine. Cowslip was decommissioned in 1973 and later sold to a civilian firm in 1977. After the loss of USCGC Blackthorn (WLB-391) in 1980, the Coast Guard reacquired Cowslip and recommissioned her as a replacement.

After recommissioning, Cowslip was assigned to Governor's Island, New York from 1981–1983. From 1983–1984, she was moved to the Coast Guard yard in Curtis Bay, Maryland to take part in the Coast Guard's Service Life Extension Program (SLEP) that eventually provided major upgrades for 14 of the 39 180-class ships. The work done to Cowslip, which cost $8.9 million, was completed in 1984 and required 16 months. The upgrades included new main engines, a Marine Sanitation Device system, upgraded electronics and navigation equipment, a propulsion control computer, and a central fluid power system. In addition, the ships's berthing spaces were renovated, the ship's office and radio room were expanded, additional storeroom space was added and the boom control booth was relocated. After renovation, Cowslip was assigned to Portsmouth, Virginia, where she stayed until 1995. In 1995 Cowslip moved to the west coast and called Astoria, Oregon home port until her retirement.

One notable incident in Cowslip's career is a collision with the 757-foot (231 m) container ship Ever Grade that occurred in the Columbia River in 1997. Although sustaining significant damage, Cowslip was repaired and sent back into service.

Cowslip was decommissioned for a second time in November 2002 and sold to the Nigerian Navy for use as a general purpose vessel.
