= USCG seagoing buoy tender =

Type of United States Coast Guard Cutter

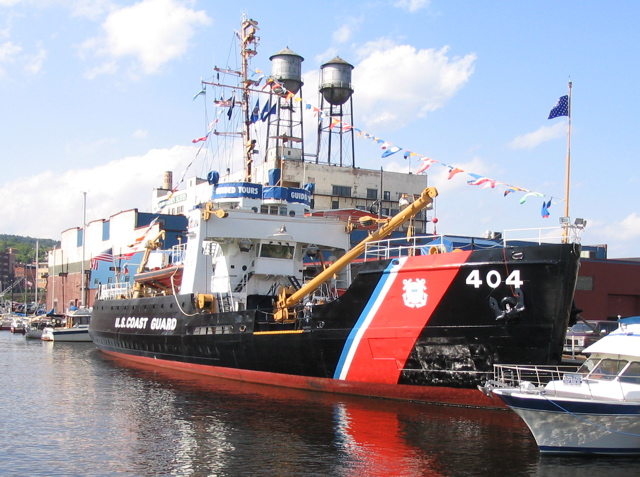
USCGC Sundew (WLB-404)

The USCG seagoing buoy tender is a type of United States Coast Guard Cutter used to service aids to navigation throughout the waters of the United States and wherever American shipping interests require. The U.S. Coast Guard has maintained a fleet of seagoing buoy tenders dating back to its origins in the U.S. Lighthouse Service (USLHS). These ships originally were designated with the hull classification symbol WAGL, but in 1965 the designation was changed to WLB, which is still used today.

== Ex U.S. Army mine planters ==
Six U.S. Army mine planters built 1917–1919 were transferred to the U.S. Light House Service during a reduction in the Army in the early 1920s. These, after absorption into the U.S. Coast Guard, became that service's "Speedwell class":

- Acacia (WAGL-200), ex USAMP Gen. John P. Story (shelled & sunk by a German U-boat on 15 March 1942)
- Ilex (WAGL-222), ex USAMP Brig. Gen. Edmund Kirby
- Lotus (WAGL-229), ex USAMP Col. Albert Todd
- Lupine (WAGL-230), ex USAMP Gen. Wallace F. Randolph
- Speedwell (WAGL-245), ex USAMP Col. John V. White
- Spruce (WAGL-246), ex USAMP Col. Garland N. Whistler

The ships were 172 feet (52.4 m) in length, 32 feet (9.8 m) beam with 11 feet 6 inches (3.5 m) draft displacing 1,130 tons. Early mine planters, at first termed "torpedo planters," had been modeled after USLHS vessels which had similar requirements for handling heavy loads alongside the vessels so that mine planters were easily converted to buoy work.

== Ex U.S. Army Chimo-class 188' mine planters 1942–1943 ==
Built from 1942 to 1943 by Marietta Manufacturing Company, Point Pleasant, West Virginia, these 188-foot (57 m) U.S. Army mine planters were designed for diesel engines but low pressure steam plants were installed instead. Six of the vessels were transferred to the U.S. Navy as the Chimo class. Five vessels were later transferred to the U.S. Coast Guard and refitted as the Jonquil class of buoy tenders were after World War II.

- USAMP General Henry Knox (MP-1) (USS Picket (ACM-8) then USCGC Willow (WAGL / WLB-332))
- USAMP Colonel Henry J. Hunt (MP-2) (USS Bastion (ACM 6) then USCGC Jonquil (WAGL / WLB-330))
- USAMP Colonel George Armistead (MP-3) (USS Barbican (ACM-5) then USCGC Ivy (WLB-329/WAGL-329))
- USAMP 1st Lt. William G. Sylvester (MP-5) (USS Obstructor (ACM 7) then USCGC Heather (WABL / WLB-331))
- USAMP Colonel John Storey (MP-8) (USS Barricade (ACM 3) then USCGC Magnolia (WAGL / WLB-328))

== 180' – class ships ==
Two classes of purpose-built, rather than refitted mine planters, Coast Guard seagoing buoy tenders have been produced. The first was the 180 ft-class cutters, which were 180 feet (55 m) long. Thirty-nine of these vessels were built from 1942 to 1944. All but one were constructed in the shipyards of Duluth, Minnesota. The 180 fleet, many of which served for more than 50 years, all went through different mid-life modifications that essentially resulted in three different classes of ship. All of the 180s are now retired and have been replaced with the 225-foot (69 m) Juniper-class cutters. The last 180-foot cutter, USCGC Acacia, was decommissioned on 7 June 2006.

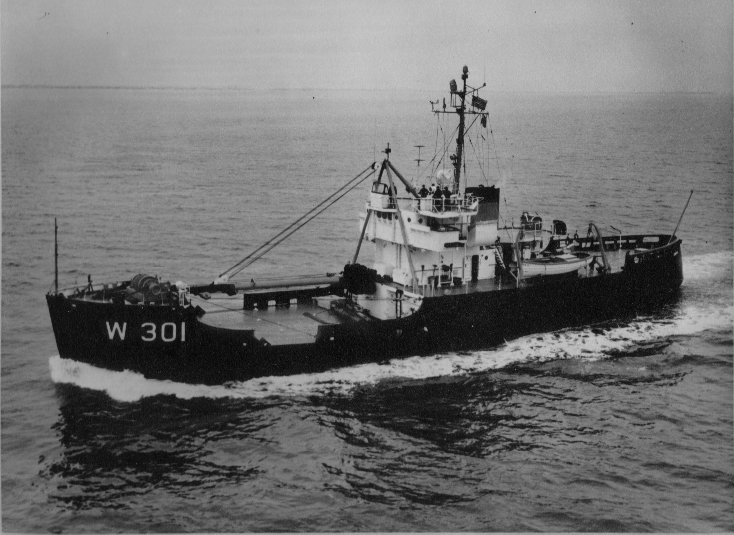
USCGC Conifer (WLB-301) c. 1966

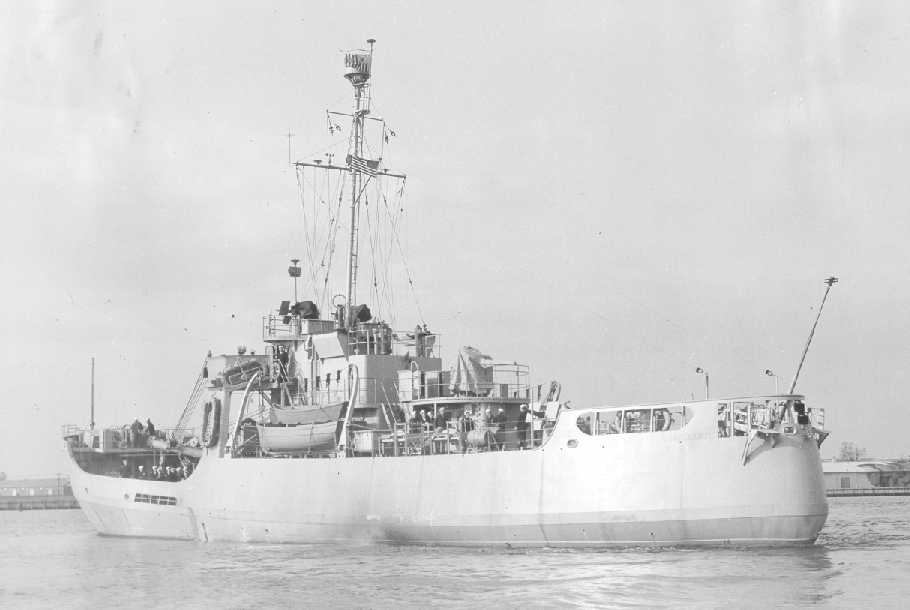
USCGC Mesquite (WLB-305)

=== Class A (Cactus) ===
- Balsam (WLB-62)
- Cactus (WLB-270)
- Cowslip (WLB-277)
- Woodbine (WLB-289)
- Gentian (WLB-290)
- Laurel (WLB-291)
- Clover (WLB-292)
- Evergreen (WLB-295)
- Sorrel (WLB-296)
- Citrus (WLB-300)
- Conifer (WLB-301)
- Madrona (WLB-302)
- Tupelo (WLB-303)

=== Class B (Mesquite) ===
- Ironwood (WLB-297)
- Mesquite (WLB-305)
- Buttonwood (WLB-306)
- Planetree (WLB-307)
- Papaw (WLB-308)
- Sweetgum (WLB-309)

=== Class C (Iris) ===
- Basswood (WLB-388)
- Bittersweet (WLB-389)
- Blackhaw (WLB-390)
- Blackthorn (WLB-391)
- Bramble (WLB-392)
- Firebush (WLB-393)
- Hornbeam (WLB-394)
- Iris (WLB-395)
- Mallow (WLB-396)
- Mariposa (WLB-397)
- Redbud (WLB-398)
- Sagebrush (WLB-399)
- Salvia (WLB-400)
- Sassafras (WLB-401)
- Sedge (WLB-402)
- Spar (WLB-403)
- Sundew (WLB-404)
- Sweetbrier (WLB-405)
- Acacia (WLB-406)
- Woodrush (WLB-407)

== 225' – Juniper-class ships ==
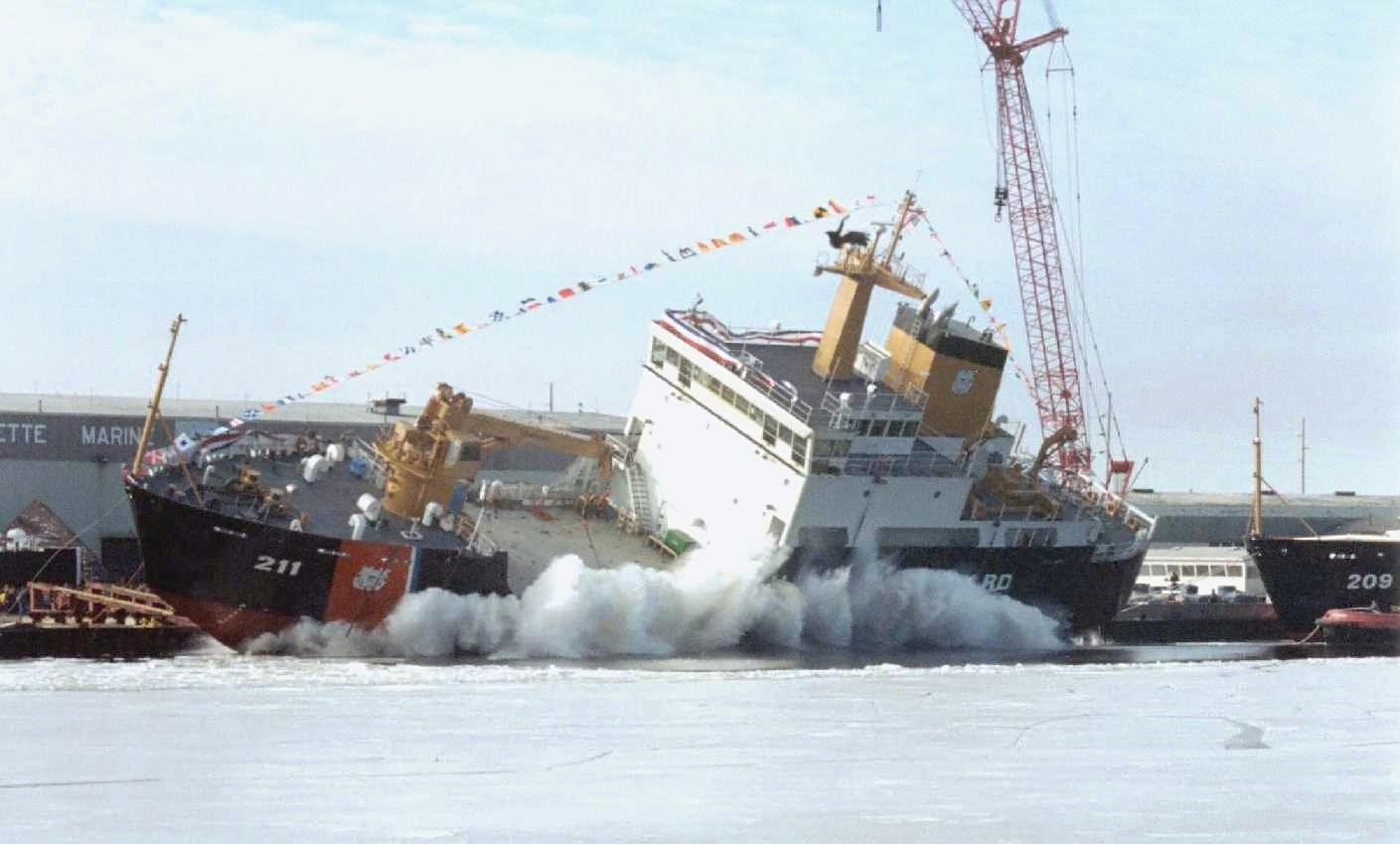
Launch of the Juniper-class buoy tender USCGC Oak (WLB-211)

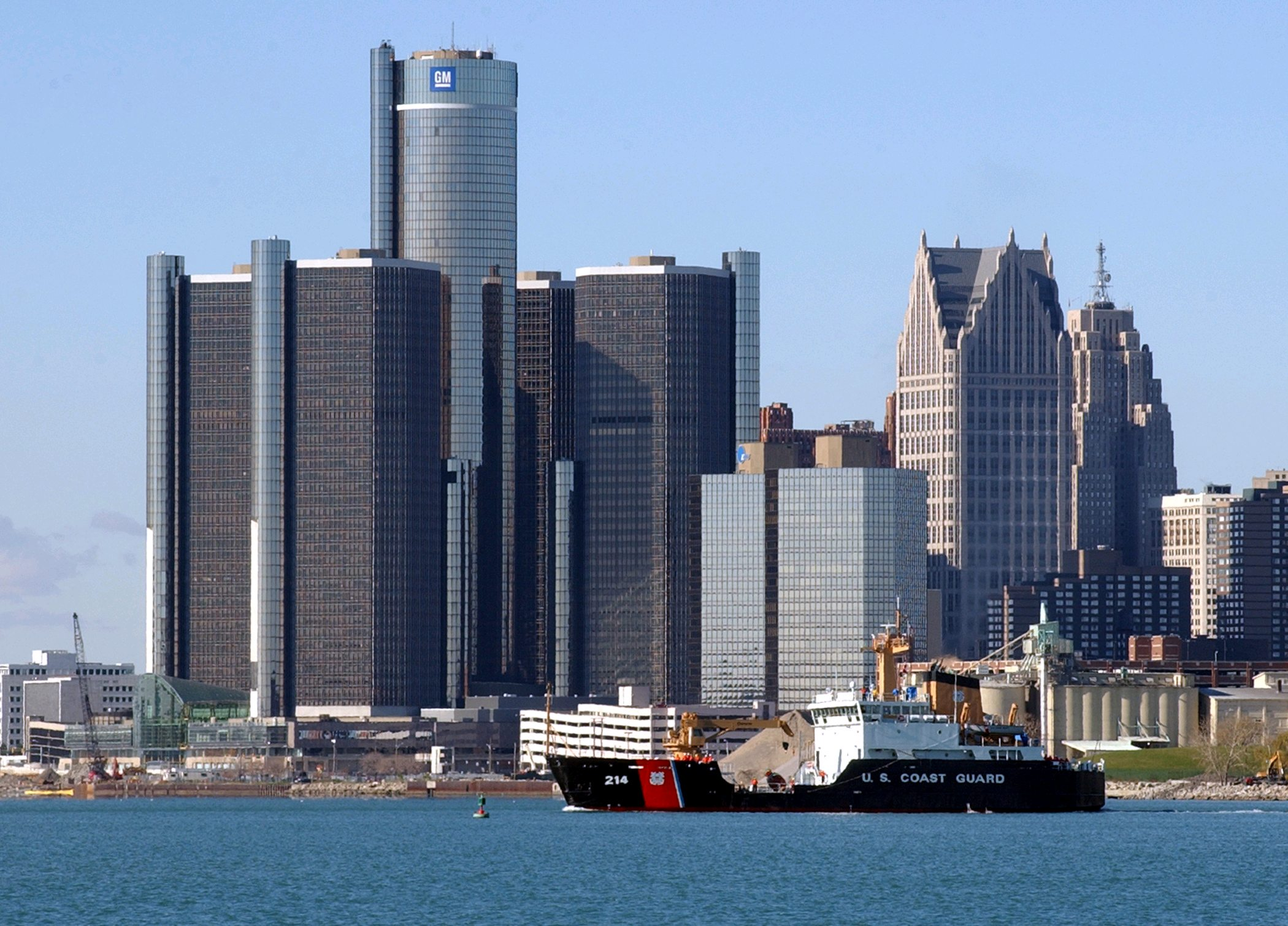
USCGC Hollyhock (WLB-214) in front of the Renaissance Center in Detroit

The Juniper class ships, launched in the late 1990s, are the second class of purpose-built Coast Guard seagoing buoy tenders. They are designed and operated as multi-mission platforms. While the 180s also performed other Coast Guard missions, they lacked the speed, communications, navigation and maneuverability of the new Junipers. Today, the Junipers conduct almost as much law enforcement as aid to navigation work; they are also outfitted to handle oil spill recovery, search and rescue, homeland security, and some ice breaking operations. The Juniper class uses Dynamic Positioning which allows maintenance of the vessel's position within a 10 metres (33 ft) circle in winds of up to 30 knots (56 km/h; 35 mph) and waves of up to 8 feet (2.4 m).

- Juniper (WLB-201)
- Willow (WLB-202)
- Kukui (WLB-203)
- Elm (WLB-204)
- Walnut (WLB-205)
- Spar (WLB-206)
- Maple (WLB-207)
- Aspen (WLB-208)
- Sycamore (WLB-209)
- Cypress (WLB-210)
- Oak (WLB-211)
- Hickory (WLB-212)
- Fir (WLB-213)
- Hollyhock (WLB-214)
- Sequoia (WLB-215)
- Alder (WLB-216)

== See also ==
- USCG coastal buoy tender
- USCG inland buoy tender
- USCG inland construction tender
- USCGC Mackinaw (WLBB-30) - A single vessel outfitted similar to a Juniper but with an icebreaking hull.

== Bibliography ==
- Grover, David (1987). U.S. Army Ships and Watercraft of World War II. Naval Institute Press. ISBN 0-87021-766-6. LCCN 87015514.
- Jackson, Ramon (20 November 2013). "Army Ships -- The Ghost Fleet - Coast Artillery Corps - Army Mine Planter Service". Archived from the original on 27 September 2011.
- "225-foot Seagoing Buoy Tender (WLB)". Aircraft, Boats, and Cutters: Cutters. United States Coast Guard.
- "US Coast Guard 180-Foot Buoy Tenders" (PDF). Historic American Engineering Record. National Park Service. 2003.
- USCG Historian's Office. "Spruce, 1923". United States Coast Guard.
