= USCGC Kukui (WLB-203) =

U.S. Coast Guard seagoing buoy tender

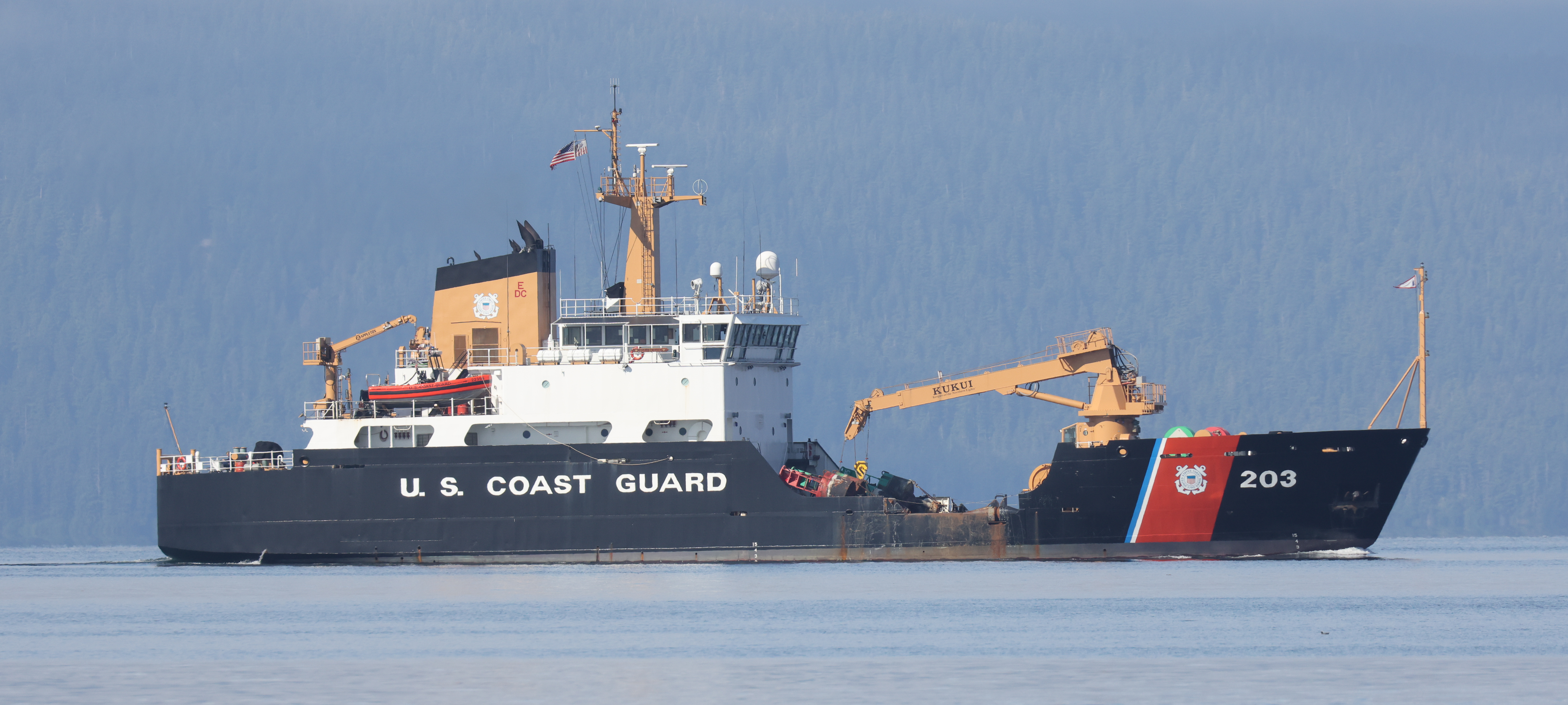
- USCGC Kukui in 2025

History

United States
- Name: USCGC Kukui (WLB-203)
- Namesake: The state tree of Hawaii
- Operator: United States Coast Guard
- Builder: Marinette Marine Corporation, Marinette, Wisconsin, U.S.
- Launched: 3 May 1997
- Commissioned: 9 January 1998
- Home port: Sitka, Alaska, U.S.
- Identification: IMO number: 9155559; MMSI number: 368826000; Callsign: NKJU
- Status: in active service
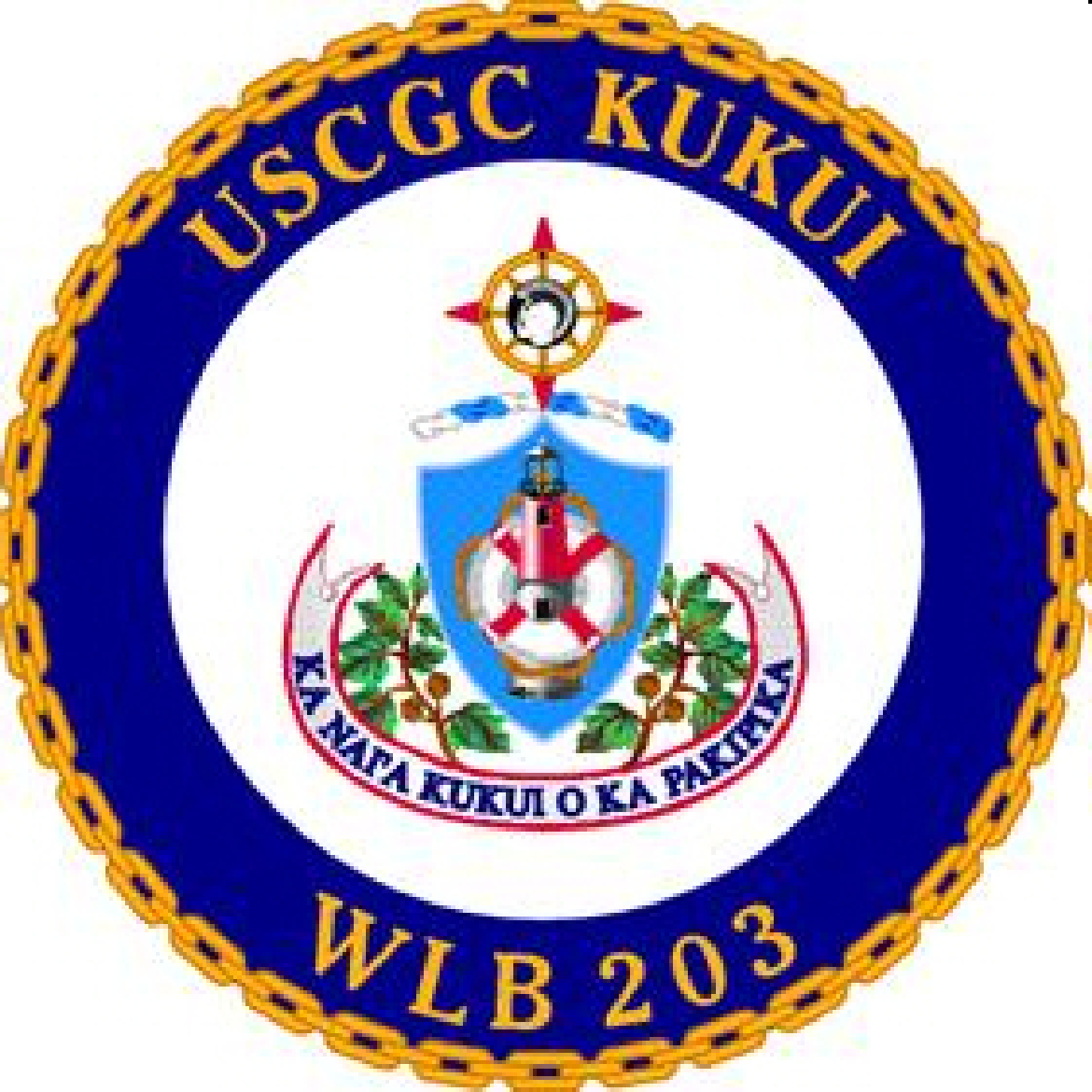
- Badge

General characteristics
- Class & type: Juniper-class sea going buoy tender
- Displacement: 2,000 tons (full load)
- Length: 225 ft (69 m)
- Beam: 46 ft (14 m)
- Draft: 13 ft (4.0 m)
- Propulsion: 2 x 3,100 hp Caterpillar diesel engines
- Speed: 16 knots
- Armament: 2 x .50 caliber heavy machine guns

USCGC Kukui (WLB-203) is the third cutter in the Juniper-class 225 ft (69 m) of seagoing buoy tenders and is the third ship to bear the name. She is under the operational control of the Commander of the Seventeenth Coast Guard District and is home-ported in Sitka, Alaska. Her primary area of responsibility is the inland and coastal waters of southeastern Alaska. Kukui conducts heavy lift aids-to-navigation operations, and law enforcement, homeland security, environmental pollution response, and search and rescue as directed.

== Construction and characteristics ==
USCGC Kukui was built by the Marinette Marine Corporation in Wisconsin and launched on 3 May 1997. She has a length of 225 ft (69 m), a beam of 46 ft (14 m), and a draft of 13 ft (4.0 m). Kukui is propelled by two Caterpillar 3608 diesel engines rated at 3,100 horsepower, and has a top speed of 16 knots. She has a single controllable-pitch propeller, which along with bow and stern thrusters allow the ship to be maneuvered to set buoys close offshore and in restricted waters. A dynamic global positioning system coupled with machinery plant controls and a chart display and information system allow station-keeping of the ship within a five-meter accuracy of the planned position without human intervention. Kukui is also equipped with an oil-skimming system known as the Spilled Oil Recovery System (SORS) which is used in her mission of maritime environmental protection. The cutter has a 2,875 square foot buoy deck area with a crane used for servicing large ocean buoys.

== Mission ==
USCGC Kukui is a seagoing buoy tender with her primary mission being the servicing of aids-to navigation buoys in her area of responsibility (AOR) within the Seventeenth Coast Guard District. Kukui's other missions include maritime law enforcement, homeland security, ensuring the security of ports and waterways, maritime environmental response, as well as search and rescue duties. She is home-ported in Sitka, Alaska. Her primary area of responsibility is the inland and coastal waters of southeastern Alaska.

== History ==
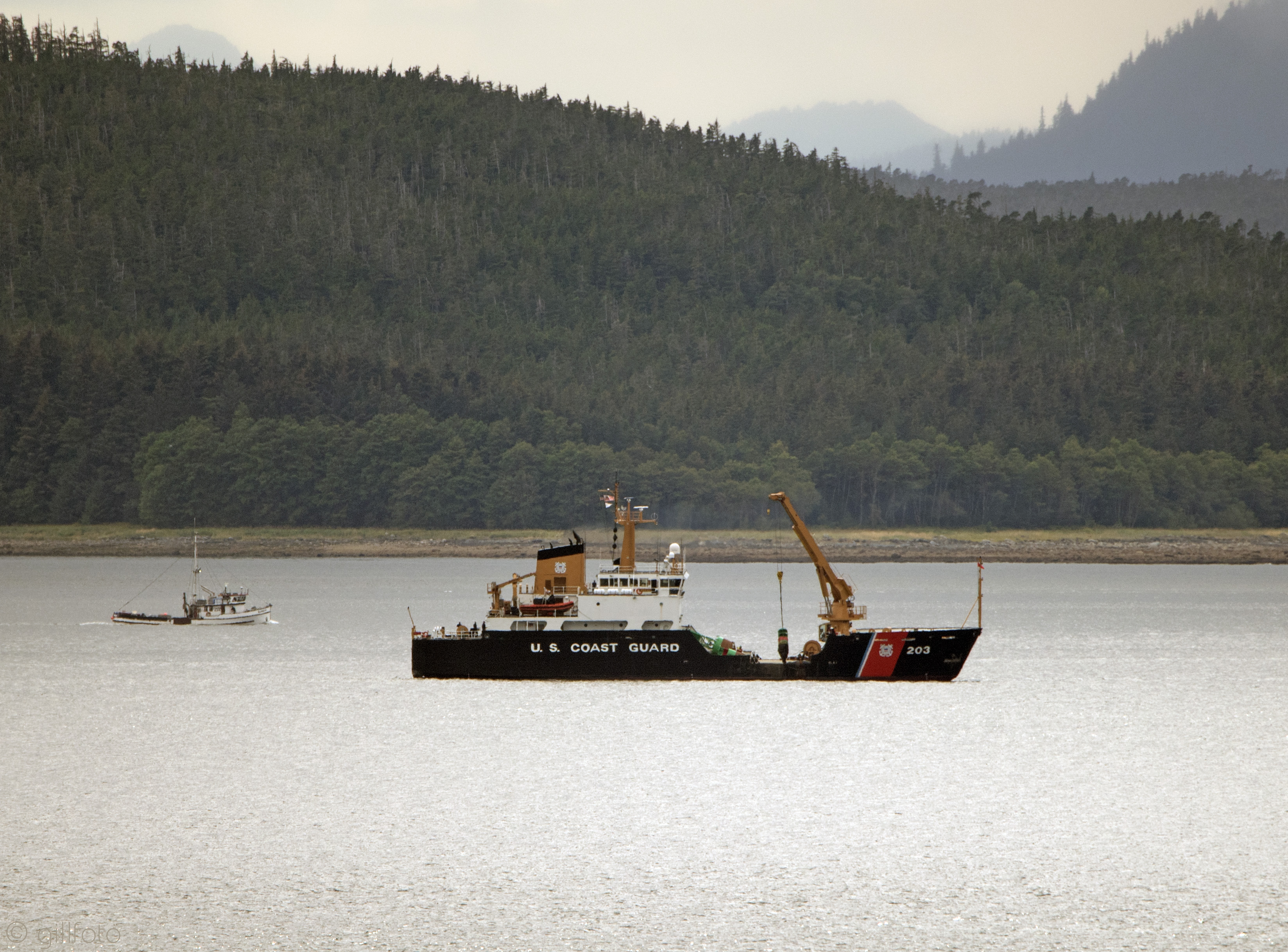
USCGC Kukui raising a buoy

Commissioned on 9 January 1998, USCGC Kukui is named after the official state tree of Hawaii and is the third ship to bear the name. USCGC Kukui (WAK-186) was the second ship to bear the name. While stationed in Hawaii, Kukui was involved in the rescue of a Taiwanese fisherman from the fishing vessel Sheng Yi Tsai No. 166 on 5 December 2007. The injured fisherman was transferred to Kukui via the cutter's small boat over 200 nm from Johnson Atoll, an isolated atoll historically used by the U.S. military as an airbase, nuclear and biological weapons site, and secret missile base. Kukui proceeded to Johnson Atoll where the fisherman was brought ashore. A C-130 Hercules from Air Station Kodiak landed at the abandoned airfield after the crew of Kukui swept the airstrip for debris. The fisherman was flown to Honolulu for advanced medical treatment.

Kukui left her original homeport of Honolulu for the last time on 9 January 2017. She arrived at the Coast Guard Yard in Curtis Bay, Maryland for her midlife maintenance on 21 February 2017. After the repairs and upgrades were completed, Kukui departed for her new homeport of Sitka, Alaska on 9 June 2018.

== See also ==
- USCG seagoing buoy tender

== Notes ==
Citations

References

- "225-foot Seagoing Buoy Tender (WLB)". Cutters, Craft & U.S. Coast Guard-Manned Army & Navy Vessels. U.S. Coast Guard Historian's Office.
- "CGC KUKUI's History". U.S. Coast Guard.
