= List of ship launches in 2020 =

This is a chronological list of ships launched in 2020.

Date	Ship	Class / type	Builder	Location	Country	Notes
18 January	HMM Copenhagen	HMM Algeciras-class container ship	Daewoo Shipbuilding & Marine Engineering		South Korea	For Hyundai Merchant Marine
19 January	USS Cooperstown	Freedom-class littoral combat ship	Marinette Marine		United States	For United States Navy
21 January	Project Hawaii	yacht	Schacht-Audorf	Lürssen	Germany	
24 January	Mardi Gras	XL-class cruise ship	Meyer Turku	Turku	Finland	For Carnival Cruise Line
4 February	Bajamar Express	high-speed-trimaran	Austal	Henderson	Australia	For Fred. Olsen Express
11 February	Belgica		Freire	Vigo	Spain	
14 February	Iona	Excellence-class cruise ship	Meyer Werft	Papenburg	Germany	For P&O Cruises
14 February	Annika Braren		Royal Bodewes	Hoogezand	Netherlands	
February	Fjord FSTR		Austal Balamban shipyard		Philippines	For Fjord Line
6 March	Arklow Ace	Arklow B-series	Ferus Smit	Hoogezand	Netherlands	For Arklow Shipping
19 March	Ocean Victory	Infinity-class cruise ship	China Merchants Heavy Industry	Haimen	China	For SunStone Ships
25 March	CMA CGM Tenere	LNG-powered container ship	Hyundai Samho Heavy Industries		South Korea	For CMA CGM
27 March	Kapitan Vdovichenko	trawler	Admiralty Shipyard	Saint Petersburg	Russia	For Russian Fishery Company
March		ferry	Remontowa	Gdańsk	Poland	for Norled
March	Le Commandant Charcot	Icebreaker	VARD	Tulcea	Romania	For Compagnie du Ponant
3 April	Arklow Wood		Ferus Smit	Leer	Germany	For Arklow Shipping
10 April	Zhong Hua Fu Qiang	Ferry		Huanghai Shipbuilding		For Bohai Ferry
25 April		Type 075 landing helicopter dock	Hudong–Zhonghua Shipbuilding	Shanghai	China	For Chinese Navy
14 May	Gaarden	passenger ship	Holland Shipyards		Netherlands	For Schlepp- und Fährgesellschaft Kiel
14 May		Gowind-class corvette		Alexandria	Egypt	For Egyptian Navy
15 May	Mohab Mameesh	cutter suction dredge	Royal IHC	Krimpen a/d IJssel	Netherlands	For Suez Canal Authority
16 May	Ultramarine	cruise ship	Brodosplit		Croatia	For Quark Expeditions
20 May	Heike Lehmann		Royal Bodewes	Hoogezand	Netherlands	
20 May	Valiant Lady	cruise ship	Fincantieri	Genoa	Italy	For Virgin Voyages
20 May	Côte d’Opale	E-Flexer-Klasse	AVIC-Weihai		China	For Stena RoRo
25 May		Pontoon boat	Brest Arsenal	Brest	France	For Defence Infrastructure Service
26 May		yacht	Lürssen	Rendsburg	Germany	
May	ECO Barcelona	Grimaldi Green 5th Generation	Nanjing Jinling Shipyard		China	For Grimaldi Group
11 June	Viking Venus	Venice-class cruise ship	Fincantieri	Ancona	Italy	For Viking Ocean Cruises
12 June	Arklow Archer		Ferus Smit	Hoogezand	Netherlands	For Arklow Shipping
June		LNG Bunkering Vessel	Keppel Nantong Shipyard		China	For FueLNG
June	BraveWind				China	For United Wind Logistics
June	Dresden	Fireboat			Poland	
4 July	Via Alizé	fishing trawler	Piriou Vietnam	Ho Chi Minh City	Vietnam	For Saupiquet
4 July		OPV 87 patrol vessel	Naval Group; Piriou; Kership	Concarneau	France	For Argentine
6 July		OPV 87 patrol vessel	Naval Group; Piriou; Kership	Lanester	France	For Argentine
9 July	Opus	yacht	Lürssen		Germany	
14 July	Hanseatic Spirit	Expedition-class cruise ship	VARD Tulcea SA	Tulcea	Romania	For Hapag-Lloyd Kreuzfahrten
24 July	Spirit of Adventure	cruise ship	Meyer Werft	Papenburg	Germany	For Saga Cruises
12 August	Ocean Explorer	Infinity-class cruise ship	China Merchants Heavy Industry	Haimen	China	For SunStone Ships
20 August	MSC Seashore	Seaside-EVO-class cruise ship	Fincantieri	Monfalcone	Italy	For MSC Cruises
25 August	Elke K.		Royal Bodewes	Hoogezand	Netherlands	
28 August	Thun Blyth		Ferus Smit	Leer	Germany	
31 August		RoPax-ferry	Guangzhou Shipbuilding International		China	For DFDS Seaways
5 September	Wonder of the Seas	Oasis-class cruise ship	Chantiers de l’Atlantique	Saint Nazaire	France	For Royal Caribbean International
6 September	Havila Castor		Tersan shipyard		Turkey	For Havila Shipping/Hurtigruten
6 September	Havila Capella		Tersan shipyard		Turkey	For Havila Shipping/Hurtigruten
11 September	Aurora Botnia	ferry	Rauma Marine Constructions	Rauma	Finland	For Wasaline
18 September	Eleanor Roosevelt	LNG-fueled fast ferry	Armon	Gijón	Spain	For Baleària
21 September	Wind of Hope	offshore supply vessel	Cemre Shipyard		Turkey	For Louis Dreyfus Armateurs
24 September	Lana	type OSV 190 SC-WB	Ocea	Les Sables-d'Olonne	France	For Nigerian Navy
September	Musherib	patrol vessel	Fincantieri	Muggiano	Italy	For Qatar Armed Forces
September	Coral Geographer	expedition cruise ship	VARD		Vietnam	For Coral Expeditions
1 October	Rotterdam	Pinnacle-class cruise ship	Fincantieri	Marghera	Italy	For Holland America Line
14 October	JS Taigei	Taigei-class submarine	Mitsubishi Heavy Industries	Kobe	Japan	For Japanese Navy
31 October	USS Marinette	Freedom-class littoral combat ship	Marinette Marine		United States	For United States Navy
October	Global Mercy	Hospital ship	Tianjin Xingang		China	For Mercy Ships
October	World Navigator	cruise ship	WestSea Viana Shipyard		Portugal	For Atlas Voyages
October		patrol vessel	Wuchang Shipbuilding	Wuhan	China	For Malaysian Navy
10 November	(Peter Pan)	Green Ship-class ferry	Jinling Shipyard		China	For TT-Line
13 November	Lorraine	Aquitane-class frigate	Naval Group	Morbihan	France	
13 November	Düsternbrook	passenger ferry			Netherlands	For Schlepp- und Fährgesellschaft Kiel
13 November		RoPax-ferry	Guangzhou Shipbuilding International		China	For DFDS Seaways
19 November	JS Kumano	Mogami-class frigate	Mitsui E&S	Tamano	Japan	For Japanese Navy
28 November	Odyssey of the Seas	Quantum-class cruise ship	Meyer Werft	Papenburg	Germany	For Royal Caribbean International
November	American Melody	Cruise ship	Chesapeake Shipbuilding	Salisbury, Maryland	United States	For American Cruise Lines
11 December	Humaitá	Scorpène-class submarine	Itaguaí Construções Navais		Brazil	For Brazilian Navy
16 December		patrol vessel	Wuchang Shipbuilding	Wuhan	China	For Malaysian Navy
18 December	Severny Polyus		Chantiers de l'Amirauté	Saint Petersburg	Russia	
22 December	Viking Octantis	Expedition vessel	VARD	Tulcea	Romania	For Viking Cruises
30 December	JDS 6000	Ulstein SOC 5000-type	ZPMC		China	
December	Emerald Azzura	Cruise ship	Halong Shipbuilding		Vietnam	For Emerald Cruises
December		Salish class-ferry	Remontowa Shipbuilding	Gdańsk	Poland	For BC Ferries
