= USS Marinette =

Marinette is the name of two United States Navy ships, both named after Marinette, Wisconsin;

- Marinette (YTB-791), a Natick-class tugboat in service from 1967–2005 (non-commissioned).
- USS Marinette (LCS-25), a Freedom-class littoral combat ship, commissioned in 2023.
