= USS Minneapolis–Saint Paul (LCS-21) =

Littoral combat ship of the United States Navy

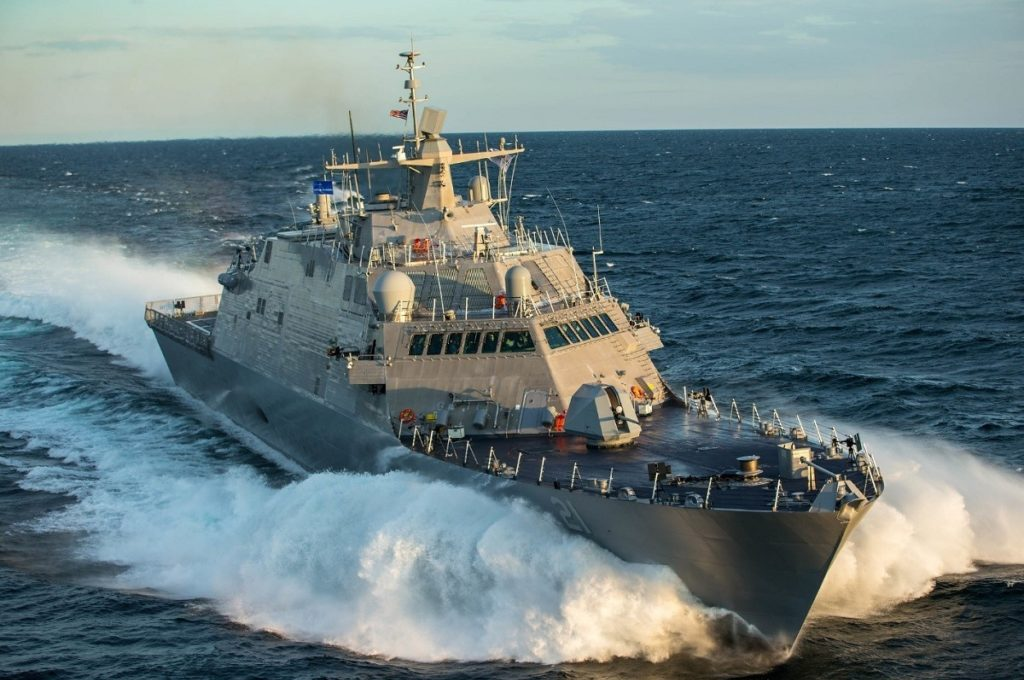
- USS Minneapolis–St Paul, on trials in Lake Michigan.

History

United States
- Name: Minneapolis-Saint Paul
- Namesake: Minneapolis–Saint Paul
- Awarded: 29 December 2010
- Builder: Marinette Marine
- Laid down: 22 February 2018
- Launched: 15 June 2019
- Christened: 15 June 2019
- Acquired: 18 November 2021
- Commissioned: 21 May 2022
- Home port: Mayport
- Identification: MMSI number: 368926299; Hull number: LCS-21
- Motto: Aut viam invenium aut faciam; (I Will Find a Way or Make One)
- Status: Active
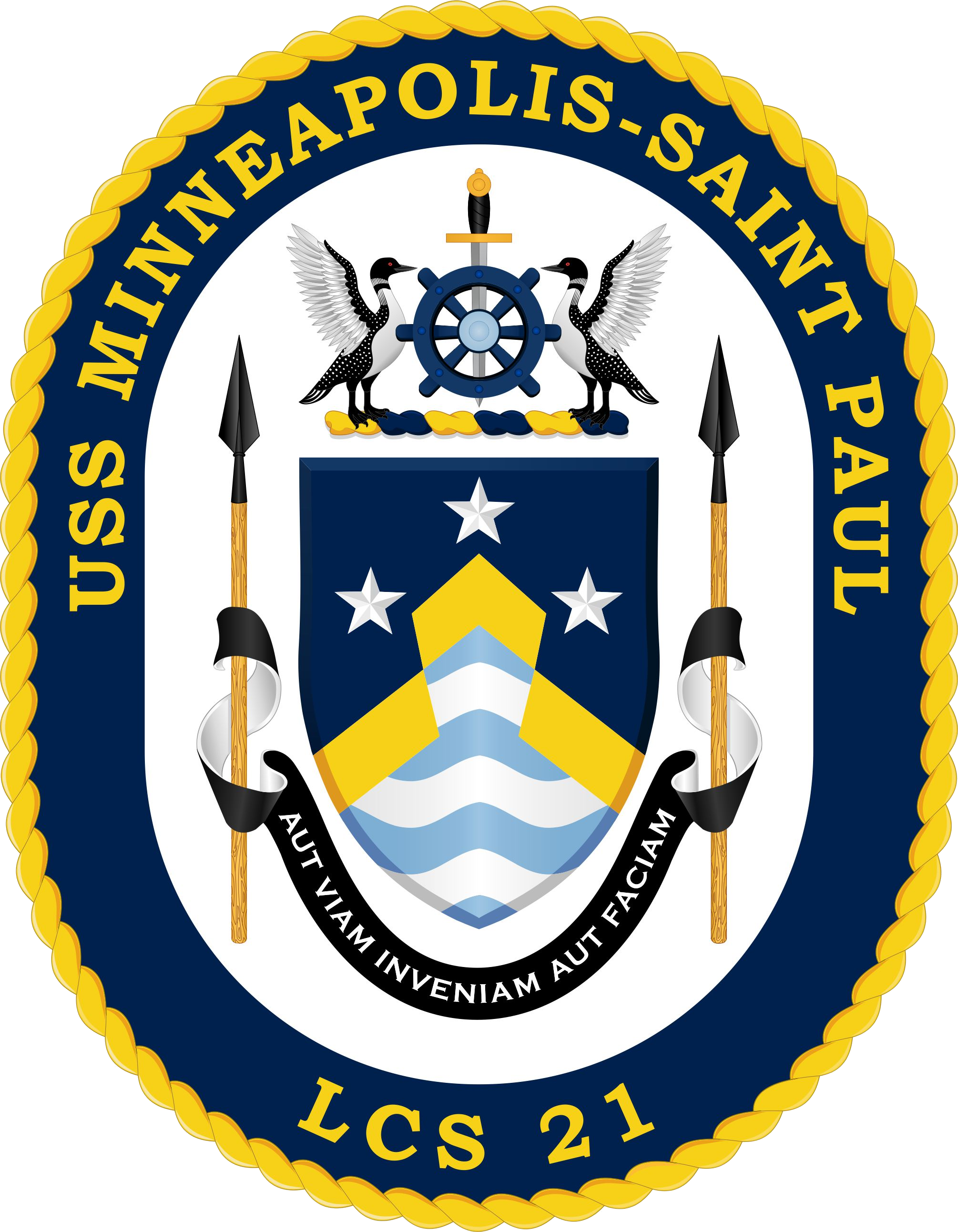
- Badge

General characteristics
- Class & type: Freedom-class littoral combat ship
- Displacement: 3,500 metric tons (3,900 short tons) (full load)
- Length: 387 ft (118 m)
- Beam: 58 ft (18 m)
- Draft: 13 ft (4.0 m)
- Propulsion: 2 Rolls-Royce MT30 36 MW gas turbines, 2 Colt-Pielstick diesel engines, 4 Rolls-Royce waterjets
- Speed: 45 knots (83 km/h; 52 mph) (sea state 3)
- Range: 3,500 nmi (6,500 km; 4,000 mi) at 18 knots (33 km/h; 21 mph)
- Endurance: 21 days (504 hours)
- Boats & landing craft carried: 11 m RHIB, 40 ft (12 m) high-speed boats
- Complement: 35-50 core crew, 75 mission crew (Rotating crews)
- Armament: BAE Systems Mk 110 57 mm gun; RIM-116 Rolling Airframe Missiles; Mark 50 torpedo
- Aircraft carried: 2 MH-60R/S Seahawks; MQ-8 Fire Scout
- Notes: Electrical power is provided by 4 Isotta Fraschini V1708 diesel engines with Hitzinger generator units rated at 800 kW each.

USS Minneapolis–Saint Paul (LCS-21) is a Freedom-class littoral combat ship of the United States Navy. She is the second ship in naval service named after Minnesota's Twin Cities.

== Design ==
In 2002, the US Navy initiated a program to develop the first of a fleet of littoral combat ships. The Navy initially ordered two monohull ships from Lockheed Martin, which became known as the Freedom-class littoral combat ships after the first ship of the class, USS Freedom.

Odd-numbered U.S. Navy littoral combat ships are built using the Freedom-class monohull design. Even-numbered ships are based on a competing design, the trimaran hull Independence-class littoral combat ship from General Dynamics. The initial order of littoral combat ships involved a total of four ships, including two of the Freedom-class design. Minneapolis-Saint Paul is the eleventh Freedom-class littoral combat ship to be built.

== Construction and career ==
In December 2010, Marinette Marine was awarded the contract to build the ship in Marinette, Wisconsin.

In 2019, the ship was christened at the Marinette shipyard. The commissioning ceremony was expected to take place in the spring of 2021 before a problem with the propulsion system was discovered. On 15 June 2021, Minneapolis-St. Paul was launched in Marinette. The propulsion system was fixed in November 2021.

The Navy commissioned the ship on 21 May 2022 in Duluth, Minnesota under the command of Commander Alfonza White.

In September 2022, the ship was involved in an allision with Danmark, a 252-foot full-rigged ship. Danmark was being towed by a tugboat when she collided with the stationary Minneapolis-Saint Paul. No injuries were reported.

The USS Minneapolis-Saint Paul arrived in Panama during the September 20th, 2025 weekend on its way to joining the growing U.S. Navy presence in the Caribbean as part of President Donald Trump’s campaign to combat drug cartels.
