= USS Cooperstown =

Freedom-class littoral combat ship of the United States Navy

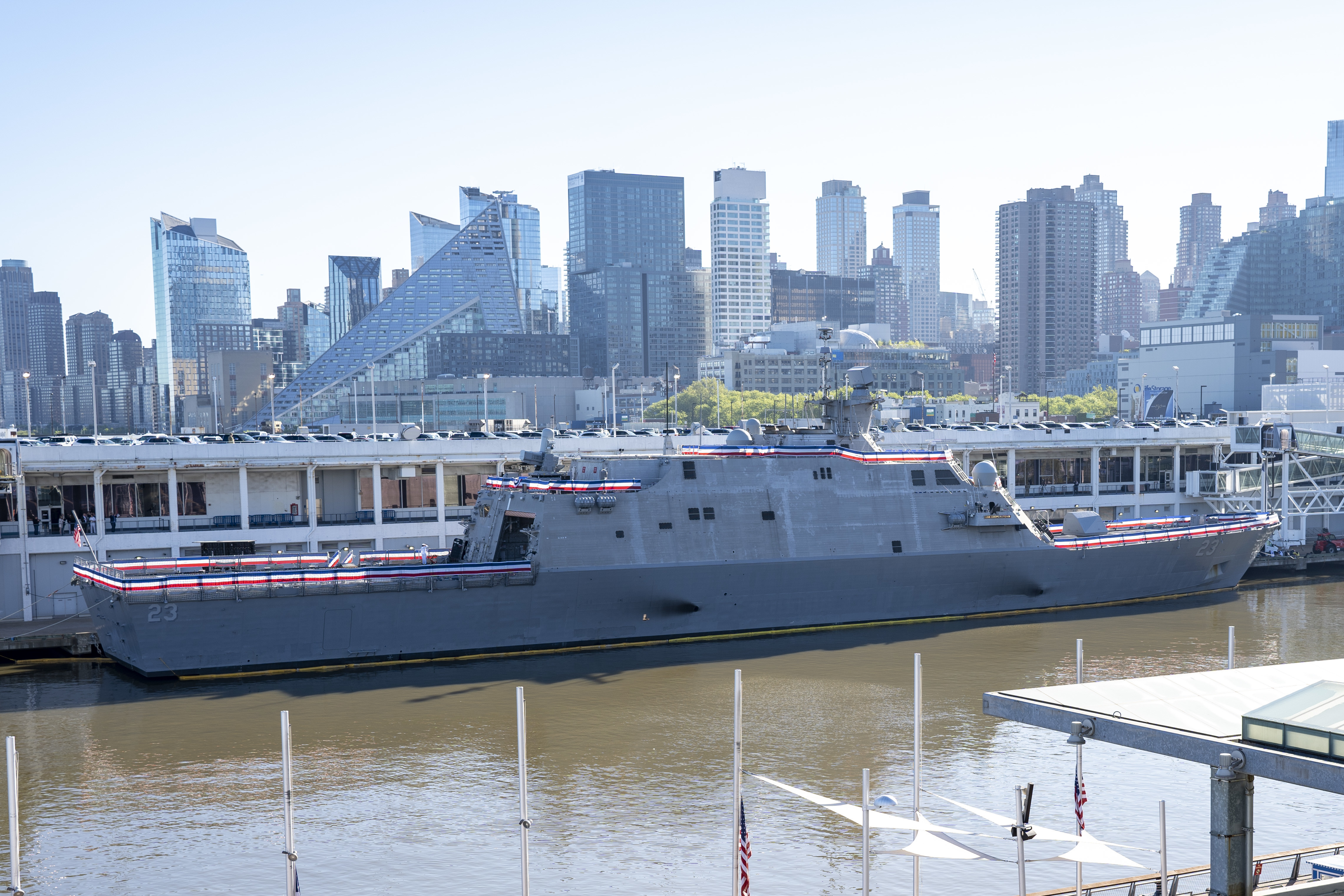
- USS Cooperstown at commissioning

History

United States
- Name: Cooperstown
- Namesake: Cooperstown
- Awarded: 29 December 2010
- Builder: Marinette Marine
- Laid down: 14 August 2018
- Launched: 19 January 2020
- Sponsored by: Alba Tull
- Christened: 29 February 2020
- Acquired: 20 September 2022
- Commissioned: 6 May 2023
- Home port: Naval Station Mayport
- Motto: America's Away Team
- Status: In active service
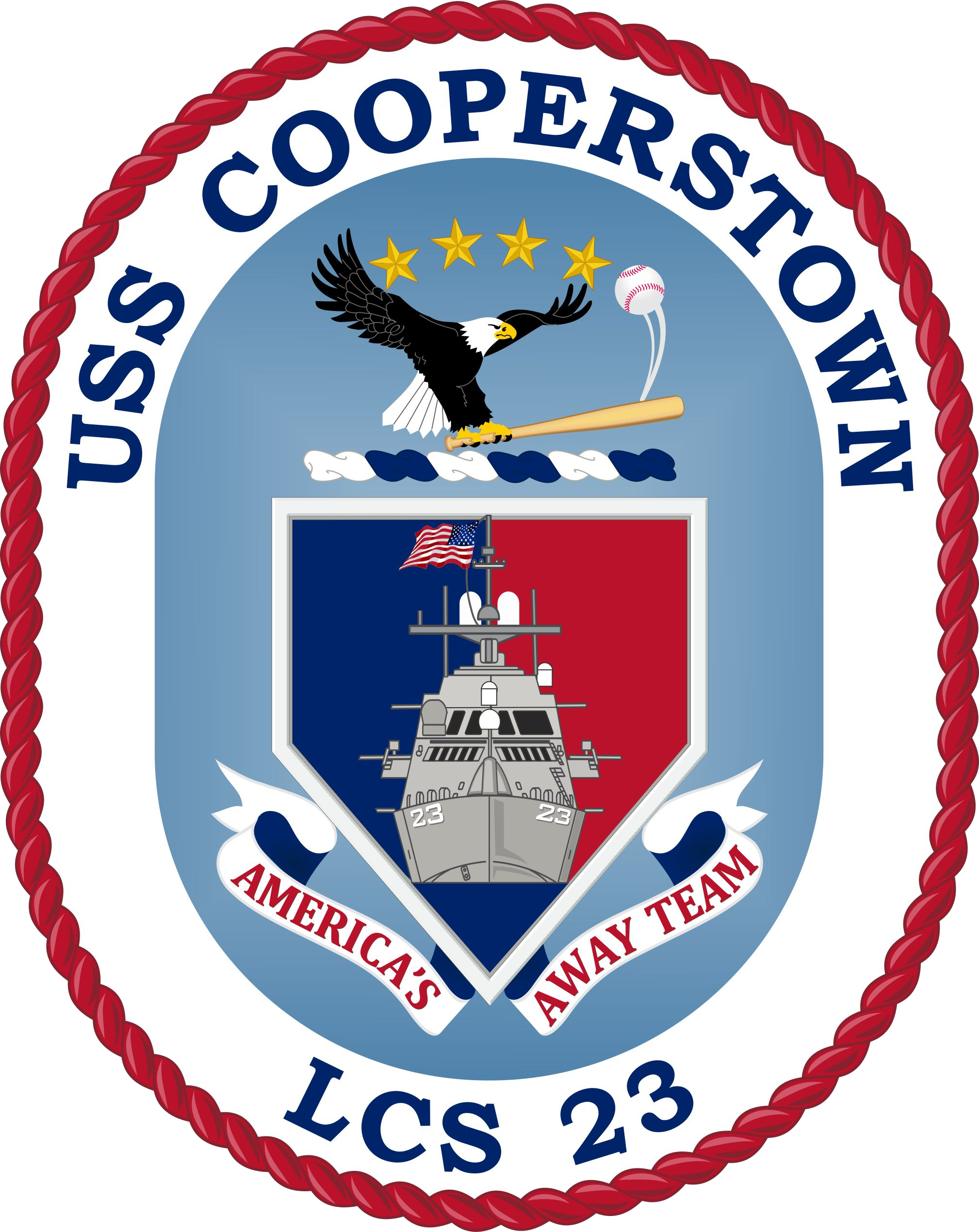
- Badge

General characteristics
- Class & type: Freedom-class littoral combat ship
- Length: 378 ft (115 m)
- Speed: >40 knots (74 km/h; 46 mph)

USS Cooperstown (LCS-23) is a Freedom-class littoral combat ship of the United States Navy. She is the first naval ship named after Cooperstown, New York.

Ray Mabus, while Secretary of the Navy, announced the naming of Cooperstown on 25 July 2015 during a ceremony at the Baseball Hall of Fame, which is located in Cooperstown. The announcement was part of the ceremony which was honoring baseball players who served in World War II. Her name honors American military veterans (Note: The number of American military veterans who have been inducted to the Baseball Hall of Fame was originally reported as 68. Subsequent reports place the number at 70, as both Gil Hodges and Buck O'Neil, who served in World War II, were elected in 2022 Baseball Hall of Fame balloting.) from multiple conflicts (starting with Morgan Bulkeley, first president of the National League, in the Civil War) who are members of the Baseball Hall of Fame.

== Design ==
In 2002, the US Navy initiated a program to develop the first of a fleet of littoral combat ships. The Navy initially ordered two monohull ships from Lockheed Martin, which became known as the Freedom-class littoral combat ships after the first ship of the class, USS Freedom. Odd-numbered US Navy littoral combat ships are built using the Freedom-class monohull design, while even-numbered ships are based on a competing design, the trimaran hull Independence-class littoral combat ship from General Dynamics. The initial order of littoral combat ships involved a total of four ships, including two of the Freedom-class design. Cooperstown is the 12th Freedom-class littoral combat ship to be built.

== Construction and career ==
Marinette Marine was awarded the contract to build the ship on 29 December 2010, at their shipyard in Marinette, Wisconsin. On 20 November 2019, United States Vice President Mike Pence toured the ship prior to giving a speech at Marinette Marine. Cooperstown was launched on 19 January 2020 and christened on 29 February 2020. She was delivered to the Navy in September 2022. Her home port is Naval Station Mayport in Jacksonville, Florida.

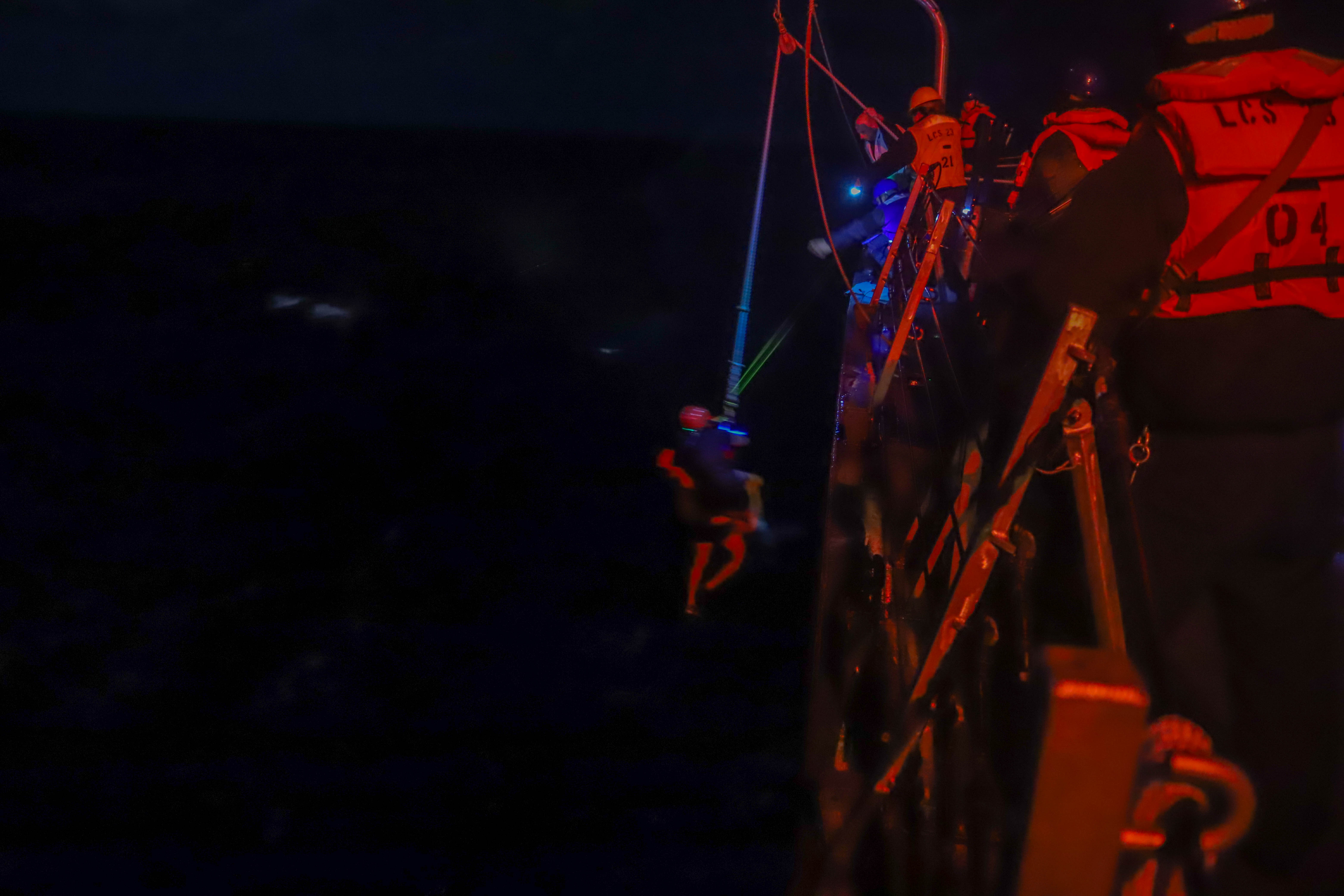
USS Cooperstown saving stranded mariner

During routine operations on 11 March 2023, Cooperstown provided emergency assistance to a sailing vessel that was in distress.

On 6 May 2023, the ship was commissioned in New York City.
