= Pokagon (YTB-836) =

Tugboat of the United States Navy

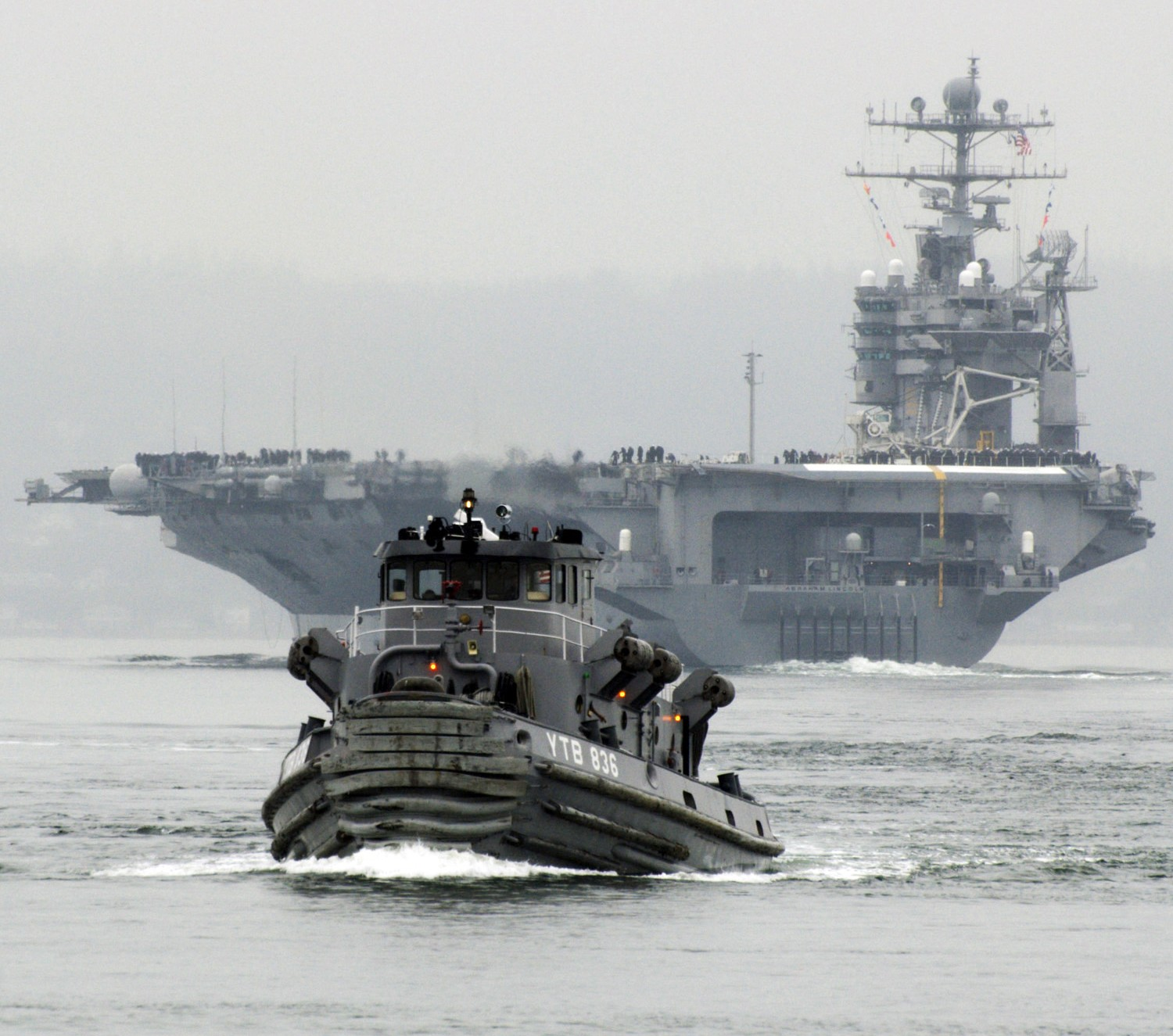
- Pokagon (YTB-836) returns to the pier as the Nimitz-class aircraft carrier USS Abraham Lincoln (CVN-72) departs Naval Station Everett, WA. for a scheduled deployment to the 5th Fleet area of responsibility.

History

United States
- Awarded: 5 June 1973
- Builder: Marinette Marine, Marinette, Wisconsin
- Laid down: 22 October 1974
- Launched: 9 April 1975
- In service: 24 June 1975
- Out of service: 27 October 2021
- Stricken: 27 October 2021
- Identification: MMSI number: 369970413
- Status: Stricken

General characteristics
- Class & type: Natick-class large harbor tug
- Displacement: 286 long tons (291 t) (light); 346 long tons (352 t) (full)
- Length: 108 ft (33 m)
- Beam: 31 ft (9.4 m)
- Draft: 14 ft (4.3 m)
- Speed: 12 knots (14 mph; 22 km/h)
- Complement: 12
- Armament: None

Pokagon (YTB-836) was a United States Navy Natick-class large harbor tug named for Chief Leopold Pokagon of the Pokagon Band of Potawatomi Indians. Pokagon is the third US Navy ship to bear the name.

== Construction ==
The contract for Pokagon was awarded 5 June 1973. She was laid down on 22 October 1974 at Marinette, Wisconsin, by Marinette Marine and launched 9 April 1975. Pokagon was the last ship of the Natick-class to be built.

== Operational history ==
Pokagon had served Naval Station Mare Island, Vallejo, California, Puget Sound Naval Shipyard, and Naval Station Everett, Washington. On 27 October 2021 the Pokogon was stricken and removed from service. In 2025, she was sold to Homestead Marine Services and plans to run cargo barges in Alaska.

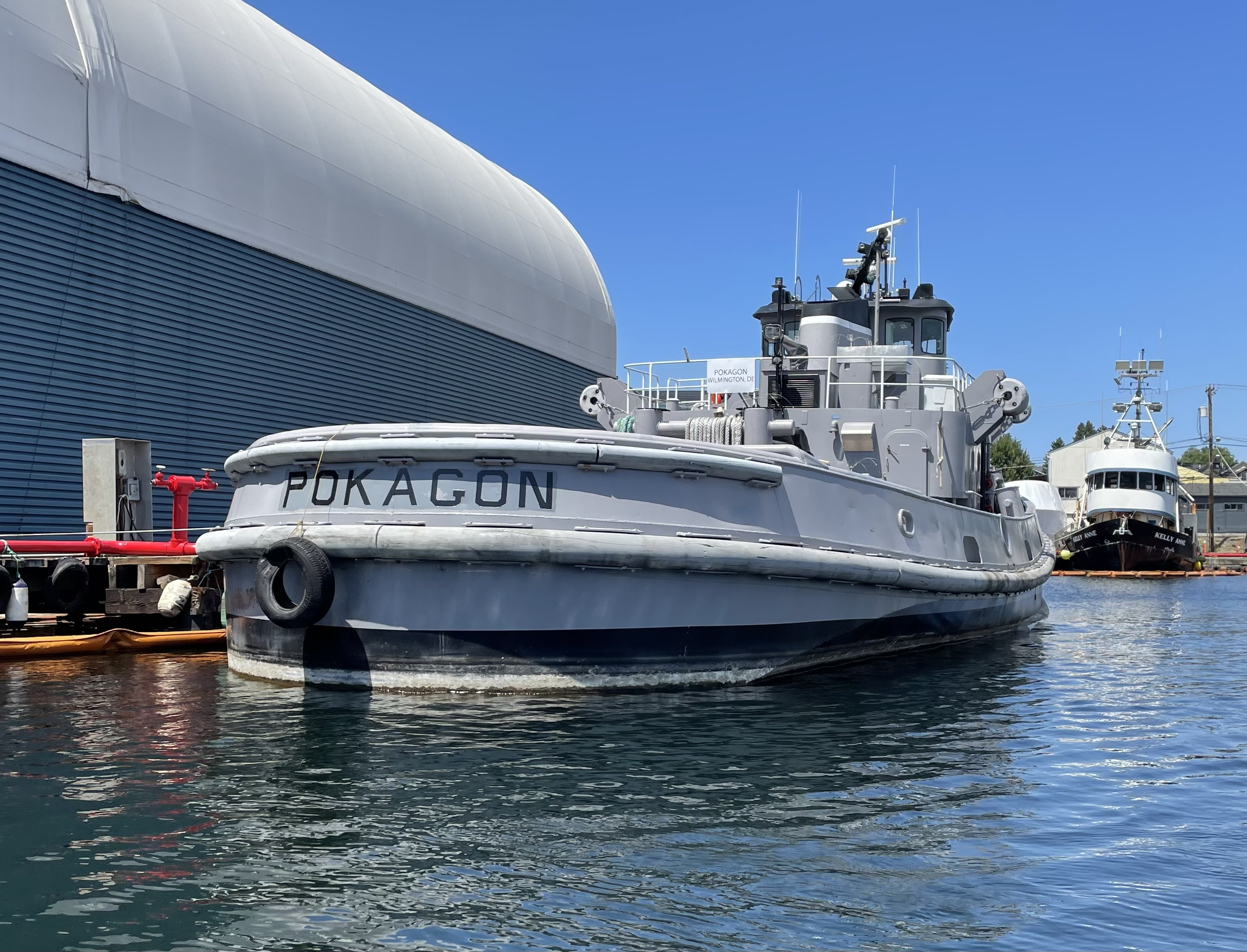
Pokogon (YTB-836) moored in Seattle, Washington
