= USCGC Maple =

U.S. Coast Guard seagoing buoy tender

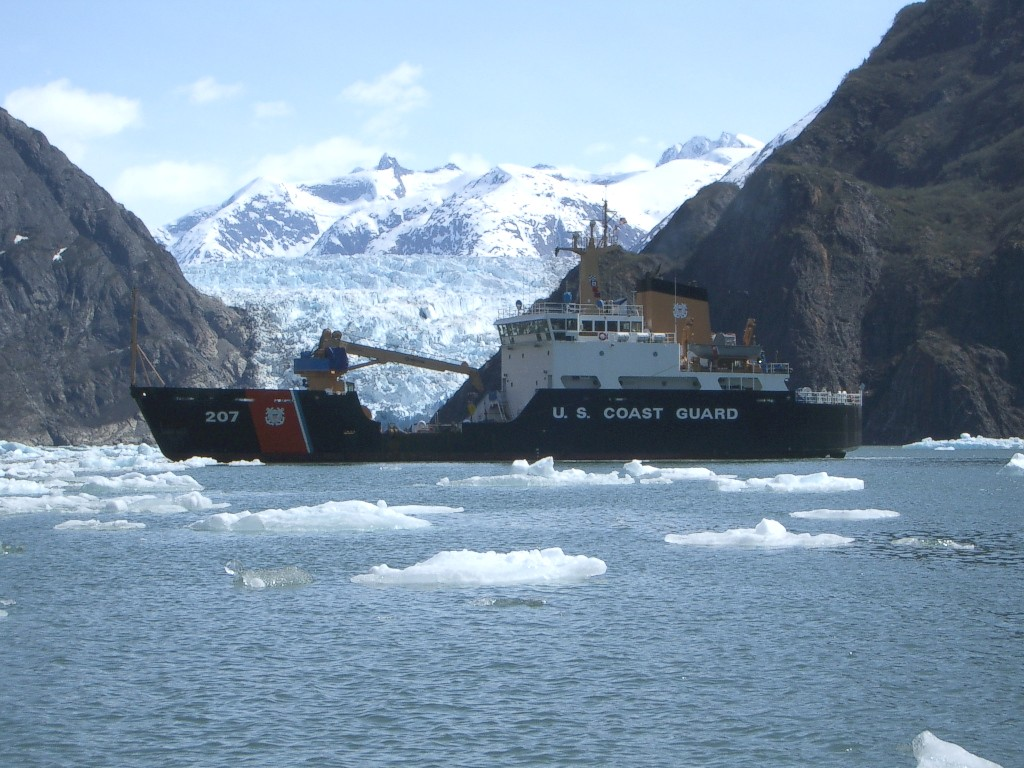
- Maple in front of the LeConte Glacier

History

United States
- Name: USCGC Maple (WLB-207)
- Builder: Marinette Marine, Marinette, Wisconsin
- Launched: December 16, 2000
- Commissioned: October 19, 2001
- Home port: Atlantic Beach, North Carolina
- Identification: IMO number: 9258208; MMSI number: 368857000; Callsign: NWBE
- Motto: "Tender of the Capes" (formerly "Keeper of the Northern Lights")
- Status: Active
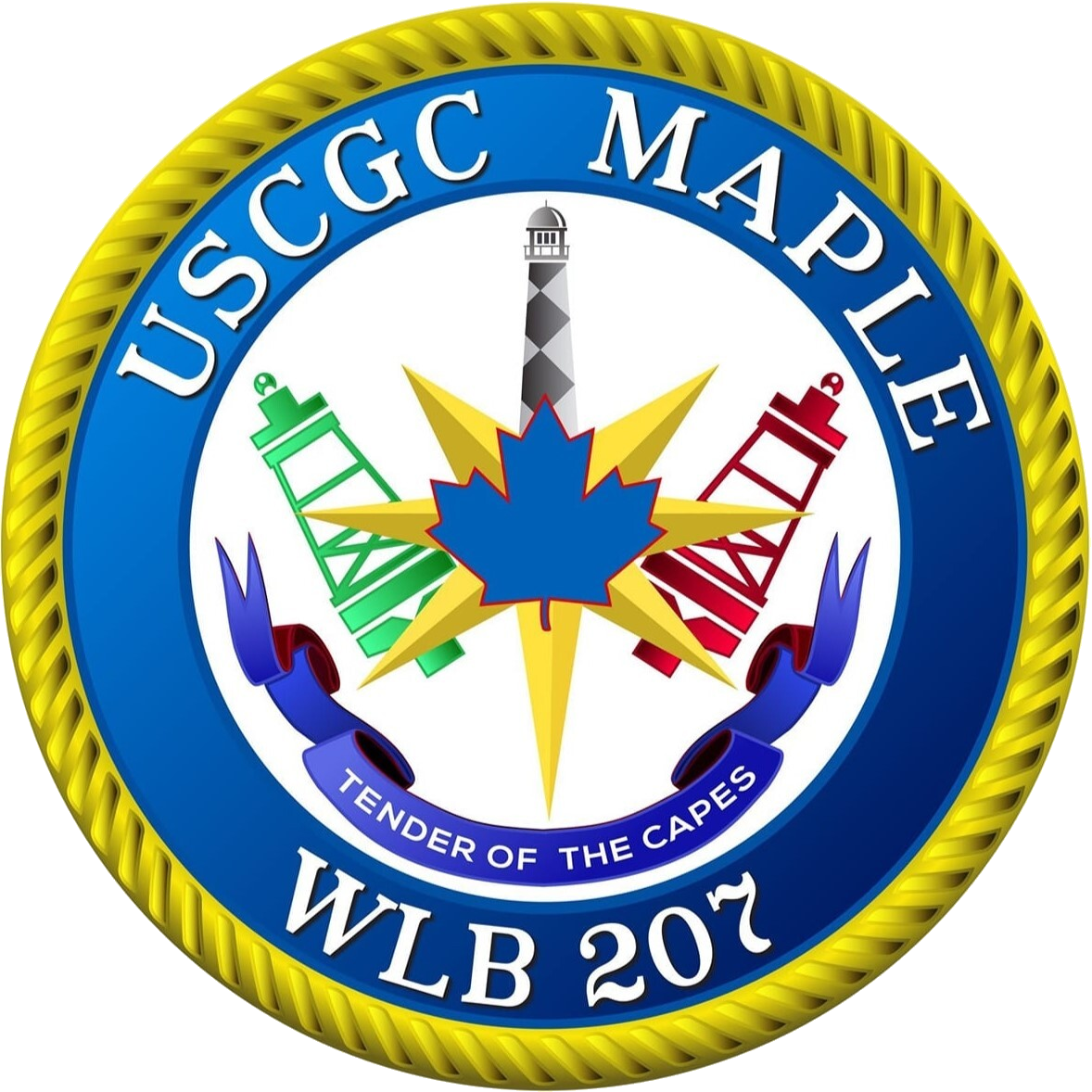
- Badge

General characteristics
- Class & type: Juniper-class seagoing buoy tender
- Displacement: 2,000 long tons (full load)
- Length: 225 ft (69 m)
- Beam: 46 ft (14 m)
- Draft: 13 ft (4.0 m)
- Installed power: 2 × Caterpillar 3608 engines; 3,100 shp (2,300 kW) each
- Propulsion: single variable-pitch propeller
- Speed: 15 knots (28 km/h; 17 mph)
- Boats & landing craft carried: 1 × 22 ft (6.7 m) RHIB; 1 × 24 ft (7.3 m) aluminum-hulled workboat
- Complement: 7 officers, 46 enlisted

USCGC Maple (WLB-207) is a Juniper-class seagoing buoy tender operated by the United States Coast Guard. She was based at Sitka, Alaska for 16 years and is currently homeported at Atlantic Beach, North Carolina. Her primary mission is maintaining aids to navigation, but she also supports search and rescue, law enforcement, oil spill response, and other Coast Guard missions.

== Construction and characteristics ==
Maple was built by the Marinette Marine Corporation on the Menominee River in Wisconsin. She was launched on December 16, 2000. She was christened by Fran Ulmer, Lieutenant Governor of Alaska. She was the seventh of the fourteen Juniper-class ships launched. Her original cost was reported as $30 million.

Maple's hull is constructed of welded steel plates. She is 225 feet (69 m) long and has a beam of 46 feet (14 m). She is capable of maintaining a sustained speed of 15 knots. The ship has thirteen diesel fuel tanks capable of holding 74,498 gallons. Maple has an unrefueled range of 6,000 miles at 12 knots.

Maple has a single variable-pitch propeller that is powered by two Caterpillar 3608 Diesel engines, each with an indicated 3,100 shp. There are two electric maneuvering thrusters, the bow thruster producing 460 hp and the stern thruster producing 550 hp. The thrusters act as part of a dynamic positioning system that is capable of maintaining the ship within five meters of a fixed position on the sea in winds up to 30 knots and seas up to 8 feet (2.4 m). This allows the crew to work on buoys in difficult weather conditions.

The ship's crane extends to 60 feet (18 m) and can lift 40,000 pounds (18,000 kg) onto her buoy deck, which is 2,875 square feet in area. This capability has allowed Maple to service NOAA's 6-meter NOMAD weather buoys, which weigh 25,000 pounds.

Maple is capable of light icebreaking. She can sail through ice 14 inches (36 cm) thick at three knots.

Maple is armed with two 50-caliber machine guns and a variety of small arms for boarding operations.

Her complement is seven officers and forty-six enlisted personnel.

Maple and all but one of the Juniper-class buoy tenders are named after trees. She is the third Coast Guard vessel of this name, after USLHT Maple, launched in 1893, and USLHT/USCGC Maple (WAGL-234), launched in 1939.

== Operating history ==
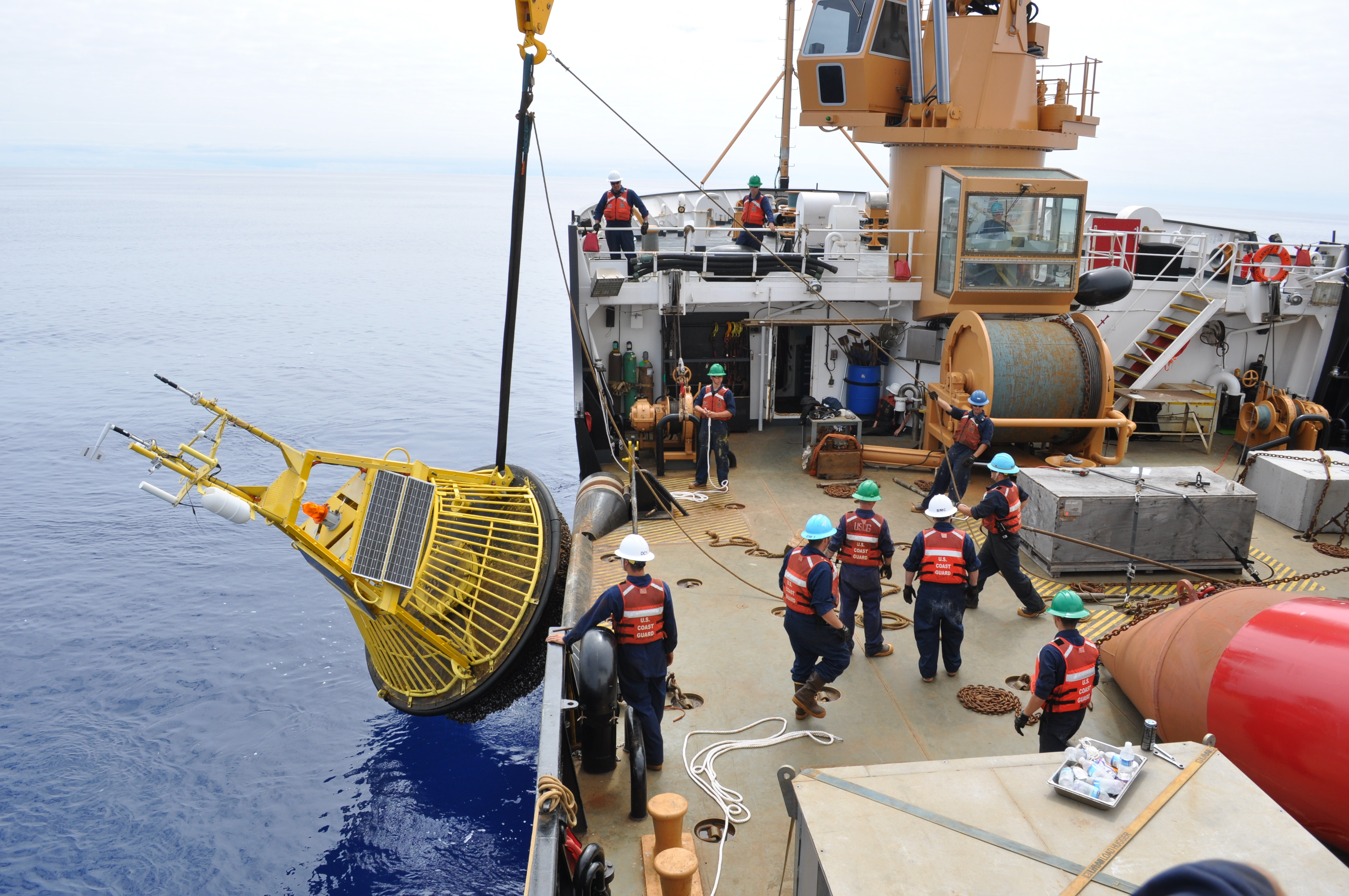
USCGC Maple servicing a NOAA weather buoy in 2010

After her launch, Maple sailed down the Great Lakes and out into the Atlantic through the Saint Lawrence Seaway. During the trip she stopped in Ogdensburg, New York the former homeport of her predecessor, Maple (WAGL-234). This Maple arrived in Sitka, Alaska, her first homeport, on September 29, 2001. She was commissioned there on October 19, 2001, with her sponsor, Lieutenant Governor Fran Ulmer, speaking again. The ship replaced USCGC Woodrush at that station. Her primary mission was servicing aids to navigation. The diversity of activities within this mission is suggested by a six-day patrol in October 2008. She recovered a buoy that was adrift in Peril Strait, decommissioned 18 seasonal buoys in Prince William Sound, repaired a light in Tenakee Inlet on Chichicoff Island, and saved a fishing boat from going aground. In addition to maintaining navigation buoys, Maple partnered with NOAA to service offshore weather buoys. In 2013 she partnered with USGS to deploy ocean-bottom seismometers to study earthquake behavior in Southeast Alaska.

Maple also supported search and rescue missions. In May 2004 the ferry LeConte went aground on Cozian Reef on her way to Sitka. Maple and USCGC Anacapa responded to the scene. In September 2004 Maple was dispatched as part of a large, unsuccessful effort to find an aircraft that was lost with five people aboard. A light oil sheen was found on Peril Strait and it was hoped that Maple's side-scan sonar might locate the wreck on the sea bottom. Aircraft spotted a drifting barge 60 miles southeast of the Kenai Peninsula in September 2006. Maple intercepted the craft, which was 200 feet (61 m) long, and found that it was abandoned and empty, with no identifying marks as to its origin.

On July 12, 2017 Maple left Sitka for the last time. She sailed for a mid-life overhaul at the Coast Guard Yard in Curtis Bay, Maryland via the Northwest Passage across the top of Alaska and Canada. She was only the sixth Coast Guard vessel ever to have completed the transit. She was accompanied over much of the route by Canadian icebreakers and research ships including CCGS Sir Wilfrid Laurier, CCGS Amundson, and CCGS Terry Fox. While the scheduled overhaul was the driver of the trip, scientific objectives were met along the way. Maple hosted a scientist from the Scripps Institution of Oceanography on the passage. The ship arrived in Baltimore on August 28, 2017.

After Maple reached the Coast Guard Yard, her crew was transferred to USCGC Kukui, which had just completed her mid-life overhaul. They sailed their new vessel back from Baltimore to Sitka via the Panama Canal, completing a circumnavigation of North America, in July 2018. Kukui replaced Maple at Sitka on a permanent basis.

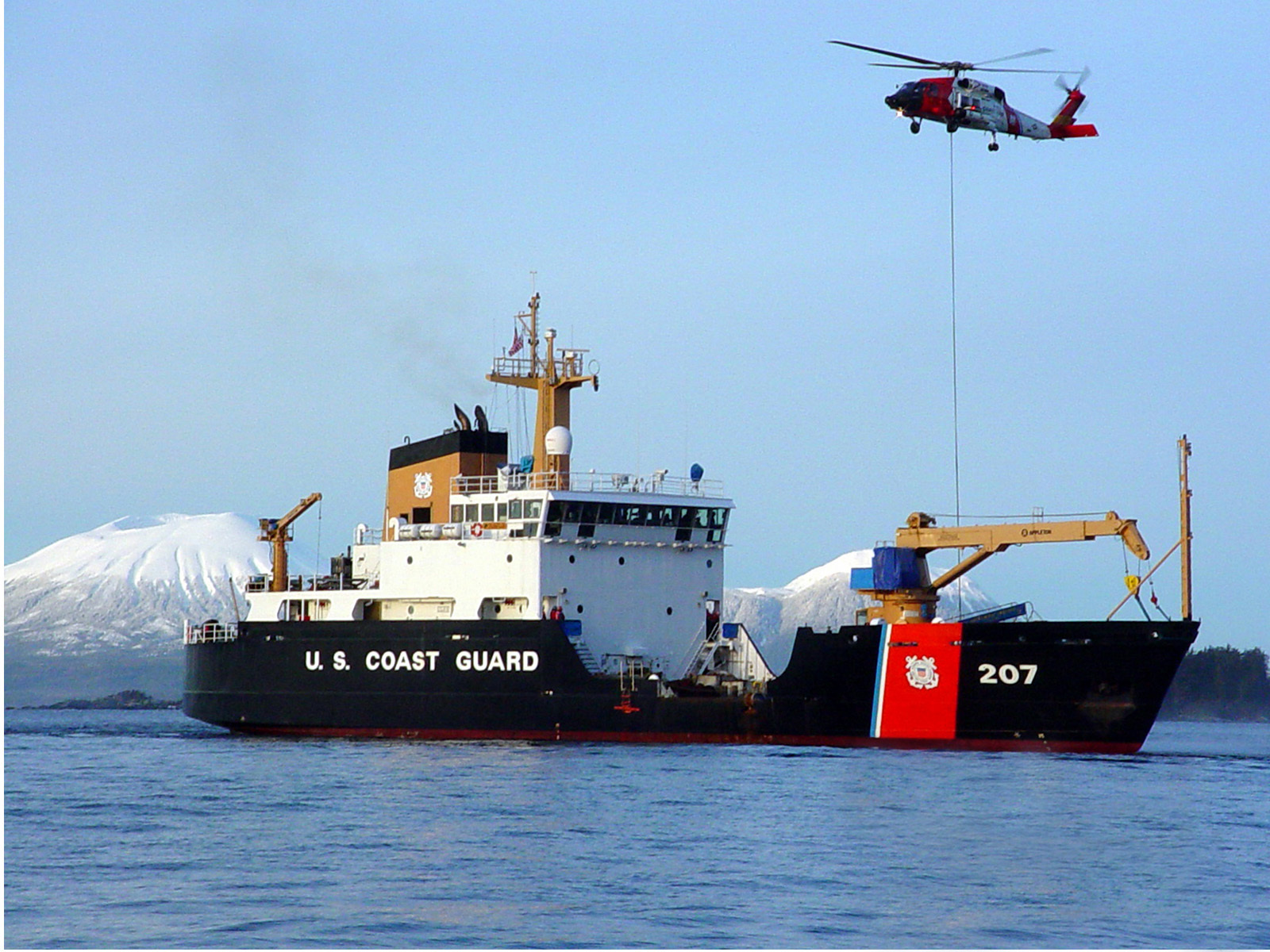
USCGC Maple practices vertical replenishment in 2004

Maple was the fourth Juniper-class cutter to receive her mid-life overhaul under of the Coast Guard's In-Service Vessel Sustainment program. The goal of the work was to extend the ship's life for another 15 years. During her upgrade much of her deck equipment, machinery control, propeller, and HVAC systems were overhauled. Corroded steel was replaced. Maple left the Coast Guard Yard on November 7, 2018.

She arrived at her new homeport, Atlantic Beach, North Carolina in November 2018. She replaced USCGC Elm at this station. Her primary mission is maintaining over 200 aids to navigation along the Atlantic Coast from Shark River, New Jersey to the North Carolina-South Carolina border.

In 2019 Maple assisted NASA in testing the Crew Module Uprighting System of the Orion spacecraft, which is planned to land on water.

Maple has earned four Coast Guard E ribbons and the Special Operations Service Ribbon during her career.
