= USS Marinette (LCS-25) =

Littoral combat ship of the United States Navy

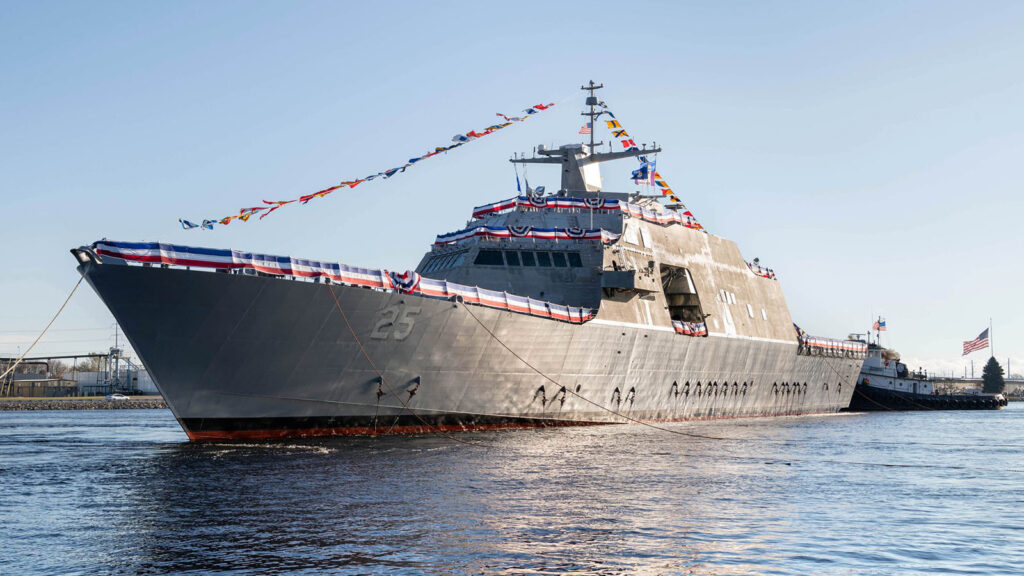
- USS Marinette after launching in Marinette, WI.

History

United States
- Name: Marinette
- Namesake: Marinette
- Awarded: 31 March 2016
- Builder: Marinette Marine
- Laid down: 27 March 2019
- Launched: 31 October 2020
- Sponsored by: Jennifer Granholm
- Christened: 20 November 2021
- Acquired: 3 February 2023
- Commissioned: 16 September 2023
- Home port: Mayport, Florida
- Identification: Hull number: LCS-25
- Motto: Freedom Done Wright
- Status: in active service
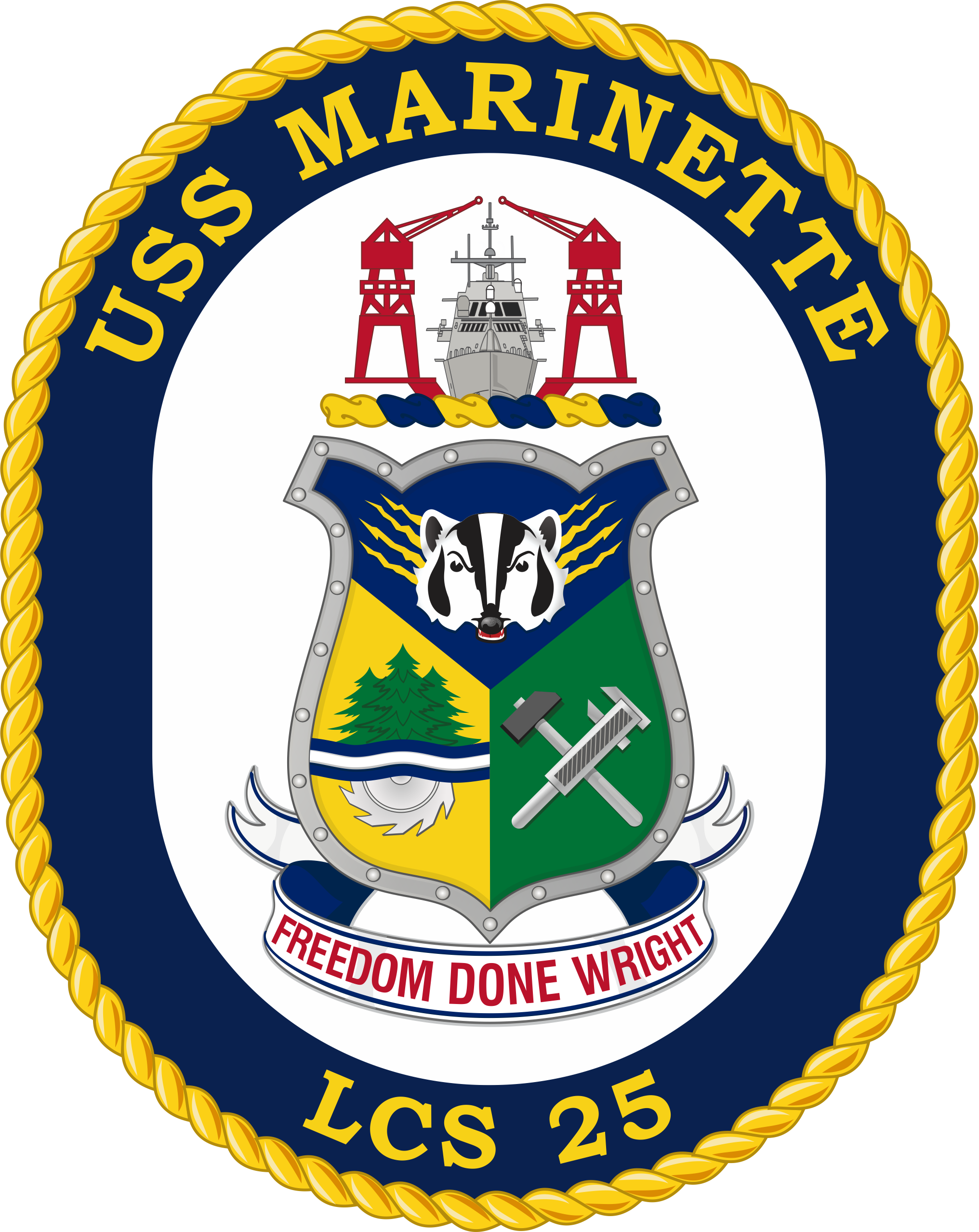
- Badge

General characteristics
- Class & type: Freedom-class littoral combat ship
- Length: 378 ft (115 m)
- Speed: >40 knots (46 mph; 74 km/h)

USS Marinette (LCS-25) is a Freedom-class littoral combat ship of the United States Navy. She is the first commissioned ship, and second overall in naval service to be named after Marinette, Wisconsin (the place where it was built), the other being Marinette (YTB-791), a Natick-class large fleet tugboat.

== Design ==
In 2002, the US Navy initiated a program to develop the first of a fleet of littoral combat ships. The Navy initially ordered two monohull ships from Lockheed Martin, which became known as the Freedom-class littoral combat ships after the first ship of the class, USS Freedom. Odd-numbered US Navy littoral combat ships are built using the Freedom-class monohull design, while even-numbered ships are based on a competing design, the trimaran hull Independence-class littoral combat ship from General Dynamics. The initial order of littoral combat ships involved a total of four ships, including two of the Freedom-class design. Marinette is the thirteenth Freedom-class littoral combat ship to be built.

== Construction and career ==
Marinette Marine was awarded the contract to build the ship on 31 March 2016 and built at their shipyard in Marinette, Wisconsin. The ship was launched on 31 October 2020, subsequently she was christened on 20 November 2021.

Marinette was commissioned on 16 September 2023, at a ceremony in Menominee, Michigan. In attendance was Honorable Mike Gallagher, U.S. Representative, Wisconsin's 8th congressional district, the Honorable Jennifer Granholm, ship’s sponsor, the Honorable Russell Rumbaugh, Assistant Secretary of the Navy for Financial Management and Comptroller, VADM Darse E. Crandall, Jr., Judge Advocate General of the Navy, the Honorable Jean Stegeman, Mayor of Menominee, Michigan, the Honorable Steve Genisot, Mayor of Marinette, Wisconsin, and Chauncey McIntosh, Vice President and General Manager, Lockheed Martin Integrated Warfare Systems and Sensors.

On October 27, 2023, Marinette's Executive Officer, Lt. Commander Jonathan Volkle, was found dead in a suicide.
