= USCGC Sycamore (WLB-209) =

U.S. Coast Guard seagoing buoy tender

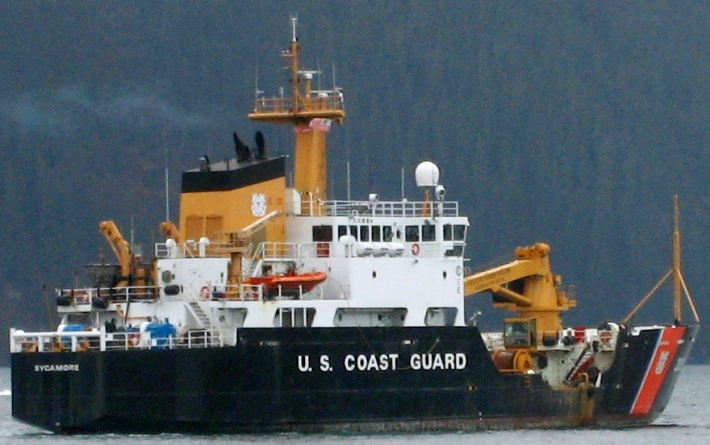
- USCGC Sycamore sailing through Alaskan waters in May 2008.

History

United States
- Name: USCGC Sycamore (WLB-209)
- Namesake: American sycamore tree
- Builder: Marinette Marine Corporation, Marinette, Wisconsin, U.S.
- Launched: 28 July 2001
- Commissioned: 2 July 2002
- Home port: Newport, Rhode Island, U.S.
- Identification: IMO number: 9259939; MMSI number: 368014000; Callsign: NTGG
- Status: in active service
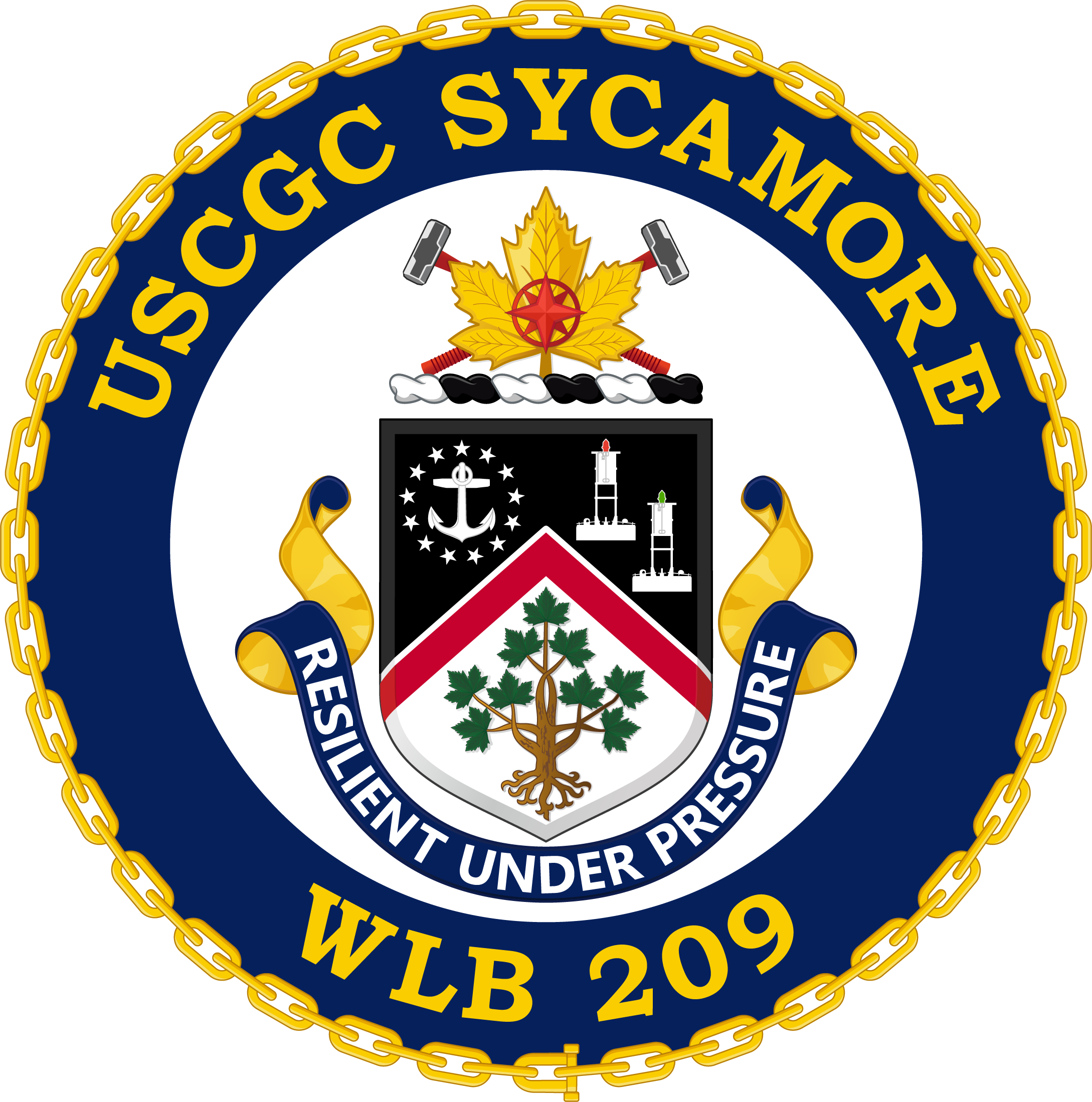
- Badge

General characteristics
- Class & type: Juniper-class seagoing buoy tender
- Displacement: 2,000 long tons (2,000 t) full load
- Length: 225 ft (69 m)
- Beam: 46 ft (14 m)
- Draft: 13 ft (4.0 m)
- Propulsion: 2 × Caterpillar 3608 diesel; marine engines; 3,100 shp (2,300 kW)
- Speed: 15 kn (28 km/h; 17 mph) at full load displacement; (75% rated power)
- Range: 6,000 nmi (11,000 km; 6,900 mi) at 12 kn (22 km/h; 14 mph)
- Complement: 7 officers, 42 enlisted
- Armament: 2 x .50 caliber heavy machine guns

USCGC Sycamore (WLB-209) is a United States Coast Guard seagoing buoy tender, the second of her name and the ninth of the Juniper-class. She is now home-ported in Newport, Rhode Island, following a one year long Midlife Maintenance Availability (MMA) in Baltimore, Maryland. She was originally home-ported in Cordova, Alaska. Sycamore primarily tends to aids-to-navigation (ATON) in Martha's Vineyard, the Long Island Sound, Hudson River, and New York City Harbor and entrances; however, she is also responsible for maintenance support of National Data Buoy Center's offshore weather buoys. In addition to her primary ATON role, Sycamore also performs other duties, such as, marine environmental protection, maritime law enforcement, domestic icebreaking, search and rescue, and homeland security missions.

== Construction and characteristics ==
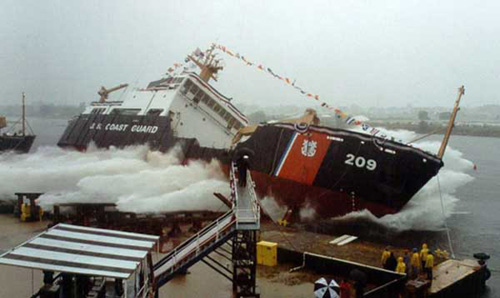
USCGC Sycamore being launched in July 2001.

USCGC Sycamore was built by the Marinette Marine Corporation at Marinette, Wisconsin, launched in July 2001 and commissioned in Cordova, Alaska on 2 July 2002. She has a length of 225 ft (69 m), a beam of 46 ft (14 m), and a draft of 13 ft (4.0 m). Sycamore is propelled by two Caterpillar diesel engines rated at 3,100 horsepower, and has a top speed of 16 knots. She has a single controllable-pitch propeller, which along with bow and stern thrusters, allow the ship to be maneuvered to set buoys close offshore and in restricted waters. A dynamic global positioning system coupled with machinery plant controls and a chart display and information system allow station-keeping of the ship with an accuracy of within five meters of the planned position without human intervention. Sycamore is also equipped with an oil-skimming system known as the Spilled Oil Recovery System (SORS), which is used in her mission of maritime environmental protection. The cutter has a 2,875 square foot buoy deck area with a crane that is used for servicing large ocean buoys.

== Mission ==
USCGC Sycamore has an area of responsibility within the First Coast Guard District which covers the U.S. states of Maine, New Hampshire, Massachusetts, Rhode Island, Connecticut, and New York. While her primary mission is servicing ATON, she is also tasked with maritime law enforcement, marine pollution prevention and response, treaty enforcement, homeland security missions, and search and rescue. Sycamore has an icebreaking capability of 14 in (0.36 m) at 3 knots and 3 ft (0.91 m) backing and ramming.

== History ==
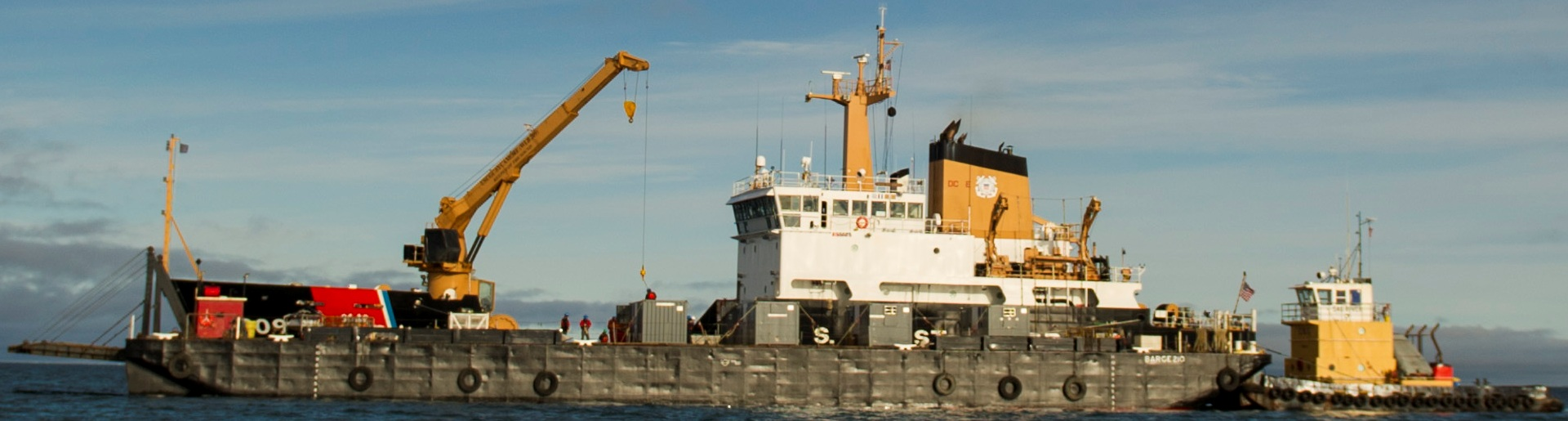
USCGC Sycamore in August 2012, anchored off the coast of Barrow, Alaska.

On 1 August 2006 Sycamore assisted the National Oceanic and Atmospheric Administration (NOAA) by transporting a towing assessment team to the stricken vessel Cougar Ace which was listing severely and in danger of sinking. She further assisted NOAA contract salvors by providing soundings in the area of the proposed mooring for the Cougar Ace and monitored the tow for oil spills while escorting the salvors T/T Gladiator and T/T Sea Victory. Sycamore enforced a security zone during the tow. During July 2010 Sycamore responded to the Deepwater Horizon oil spill by transiting the Panama Canal. During the summer of 2012 Sycamore participated in Operation Arctic Shield 2012 accompanied by USCGC Bertholf, USCGC Alex Haley, and sister ship USCGC Hickory while conducting exercises in oil spill skimming under arctic conditions as well as exercises with NORTHCOM and the U.S. Navy. On 28 July 2013, the tug Krystal Sea was maneuvering an attached barge and the barge struck the port bow section of the moored Sycamore causing damage to the railings and deck.

Sycamore arrived at Curtis Bay, Maryland on March 25, 2019, for a midlife maintenance refit. She was then assigned to Newport, Rhode Island after the refit. She arrived in Newport, in May 2020.

Sycamore arrived at St. John's Harbour (Nova Scotia, Canada) on 28 June, 2023 as part of the international recovery operation from the Titan submersible implosion event of 18 June 2023.

== See also ==
- USCG seagoing buoy tender

== Notes ==
Citations

References used

- "225-foot Seagoing Buoy Tender (WLB)". Cutters, Craft & U.S. Coast Guard-Manned Army & Navy Vessels. U.S. Coast Guard Historian's Office.
- "CGC Sycamore (WLB-209)". U.S. Coast Guard website.
- "Evening Report - Aug. 1, 2006". R/R Cougar Ace Incident Report file. National Oceanic and Atmospheric Administration.
- "Marinette Marine Corp., Marinette WI". Index to U.S. Shipbuilders and Boatbuilders. shipbuildinghistory.com website. Archived from the original on 7 December 2011.
- "Morning Report - Thursday, August 10, 2006". R/R Cougar Ace Incident Report file. National Oceanic and Atmospheric Administration.
- Andrews, Laurel (28 July 2013). "Barge collides with docked Coast Guard cutter in Cordova". Alaska Dispatch website. Archived from the original on 13 April 2014.
- Doane, Chris (22 March 2011). "U.S. Coast Guard District 17 The expanding last frontier". Defense Media Network website.
- Jordan, Teri L. "Implementation of U.S. Policy in the Arctic" (PDF). Monograph. School of Advanced Military Studies, U.S. Army Command and General Staff College, Fort Leavenworth, Kansas. Archived (PDF) from the original on 15 April 2014.
- Gillis, Heather. "US coast guard ship sycamore now in St. John's harbour along with Horizon Arctic, which arrived earlier this morning". Heather Gillis (CBCNL reporter.
