= USCGC Aspen =

Seagoing buoy tender of the United States Coast Guard

USCGC Aspen (WLB-208)
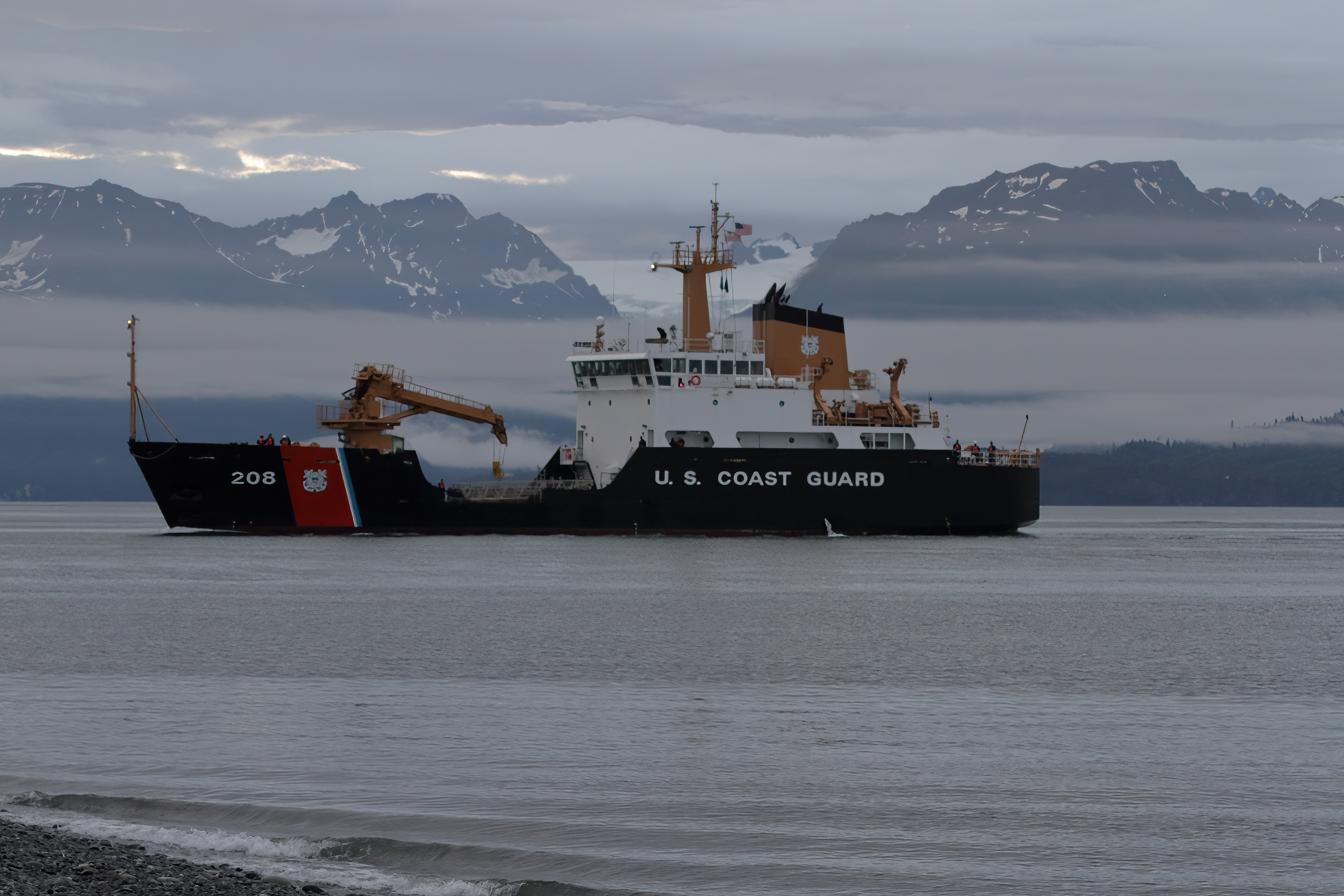
- USCGC Aspen in 2023

History

United States
- Name: USCGC Aspen
- Operator: United States Coast Guard
- Builder: Marinette Marine Corporation, Marinette, Wisconsin, U.S.
- Launched: 21 April 2001
- Commissioned: 24 January 2002
- Home port: Homer, Alaska, U.S.
- Identification: Hull number: WLB-208; IMO number: 9259147; MMSI number: 303865000; Callsign: NTUG
- Motto: "Superior Technology, Superior Performance"
- Status: in active service
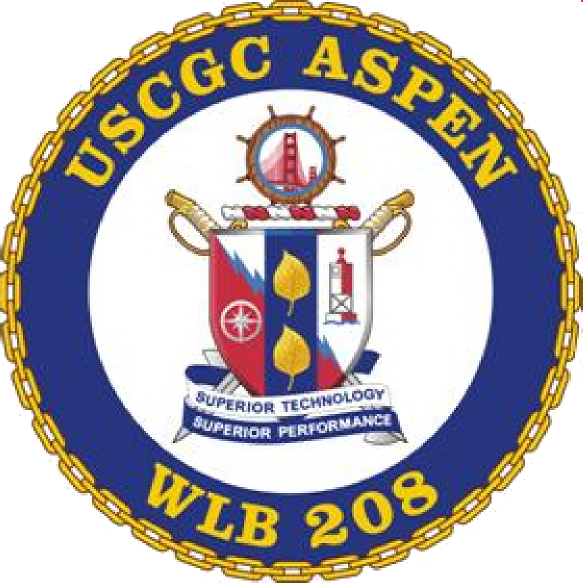
- Badge

General characteristics
- Class & type: Juniper-class seagoing buoy tender
- Displacement: 2,000 tons (full load)
- Length: 225 ft (69 m)
- Beam: 46 ft (14 m)
- Draft: 13 ft (4.0 m)
- Propulsion: 2 x 3,100 hp (2,300 kW) Caterpillar diesel engines
- Speed: 16 knots (30 km/h; 18 mph)
- Complement: 7 officers, 42 enlisted
- Armament: 2 x .50 caliber heavy machine guns

USCGC Aspen (WLB-208) is the eighth cutter in the Juniper-class 225 ft (69 m) of seagoing buoy tenders. She is under the operational control of the Commander of the Seventeenth U.S. Coast Guard District and is home-ported in Homer, Alaska. Her primary responsibility areas are Kachemak Bay of Cook Inlet to the Kuskokwim River in southwest Alaska and the high seas off south-central and southwest Alaska. Aspen conducts heavy lift aids-to-navigation operations, and law enforcement, homeland security, environmental pollution response, and search and rescue as directed.

== Construction and characteristics ==
USCGC Aspen was built by the Marinette Marine Corporation in Wisconsin and launched on 21 April 2001. She has a length of 225 ft (69 m), a beam of 46 ft (14 m), and a draft of 13 ft (4.0 m). Aspen is propelled by two Caterpillar diesel engines rated at 3,100 horsepower and has a top speed of 16 knots. She has a single controllable-pitch propeller, which, along with bow and stern thrusters, allows the ship to be maneuvered to set buoys close offshore and in restricted waters. A dynamic global positioning system coupled with machinery plant controls and a chart display and information system allows station-keeping of the ship within a five-meter accuracy of the planned position without human intervention. Aspen is also equipped with an oil-skimming system known as the Spilled Oil Recovery System (SORS), which is used in her mission of maritime environmental protection. The cutter has a 2,875 square foot buoy deck area with a crane used for servicing large ocean buoys.

== Mission ==
USCGC Aspen is a seagoing buoy tender with her primary mission being the servicing of aids-to-navigation buoys in her area of responsibility (AOR). She services over 170 navigation buoys and beacons in her AOR as well as several National Oceanic and Atmospheric Administration (NOAA) data collection buoys. Aspen's other missions include maritime law enforcement, homeland security, ensuring the security of ports and waterways, maritime environmental response, and search and rescue duties.

== History ==
Aspen was built to replace USCGC Buttonwood, a 180 ft (55 m) Mesquite-class buoy tender, in her area of operations. Buttonwood was decommissioned 28 June 2001 after 58 years of service. In 2009, Aspen seized 16,000 lb (7,300 kg) of marijuana and arrested four suspected smugglers from a go-fast boat off the coast of Baja California, which as at the time the third largest marijuana seizure in Coast Guard history and the first by a Juniper-class cutter. Aspen was deployed to the Gulf of Mexico in 2010 in response to the Deepwater Horizon oil spill. During her time on scene, Aspen transited over 13,000 mi (21,000 km) and recovered over 138,000 US gal (520,000 L) of spilled crude oil. She recovered over 35 bales of marijuana off the coast of Baja, California, and returned thirteen illegal immigrants to Mexico in 2011. In July 2012, she seized 341 bales of marijuana weighing 7,400 lb (3,400 kg) with a street value over US$ 6.7 million dollars. In 2012, USCGC Aspen recovered two (NOAA) specialized ocean wave glider buoys worth US$ 750,000 and serviced 7 other NOAA buoys. She also serviced 44 navigational buoys and helped Coast Guard Station Golden Gate with 25 hours of small boat response time. In 2022, Aspen left San Francisco to enter Major Maintenance Availability (MMA) in Baltimore. In 2023, Aspen traveled from Baltimore to Homer, Alaska, her new home port, replacing USCGC Hickory.

=== The original Aspen ===
The original Aspen was a 126 ft (38 m) buoy tender that was built by Craig Shipbuilding of Toledo, Ohio and commissioned by the U.S. Lighthouse Service on 8 May 1906. She serviced aids-to-navigation on the Great Lakes and brought supplies to lighthouse keepers located in remote areas. When the tender was transferred to the Coast Guard in 1942 it was home-ported in Sault Ste. Marie, Michigan and designated WAGL-204. She carried a crew of 2 officers and 23 men in 1942 and was decommissioned by the Coast Guard on 25 January 1947. In
