= Fincantieri Marinette Marine =

Shipbuilding company In Wisconsin, US

Coordinates: 45°5′56.56″N 87°37′5.96″W

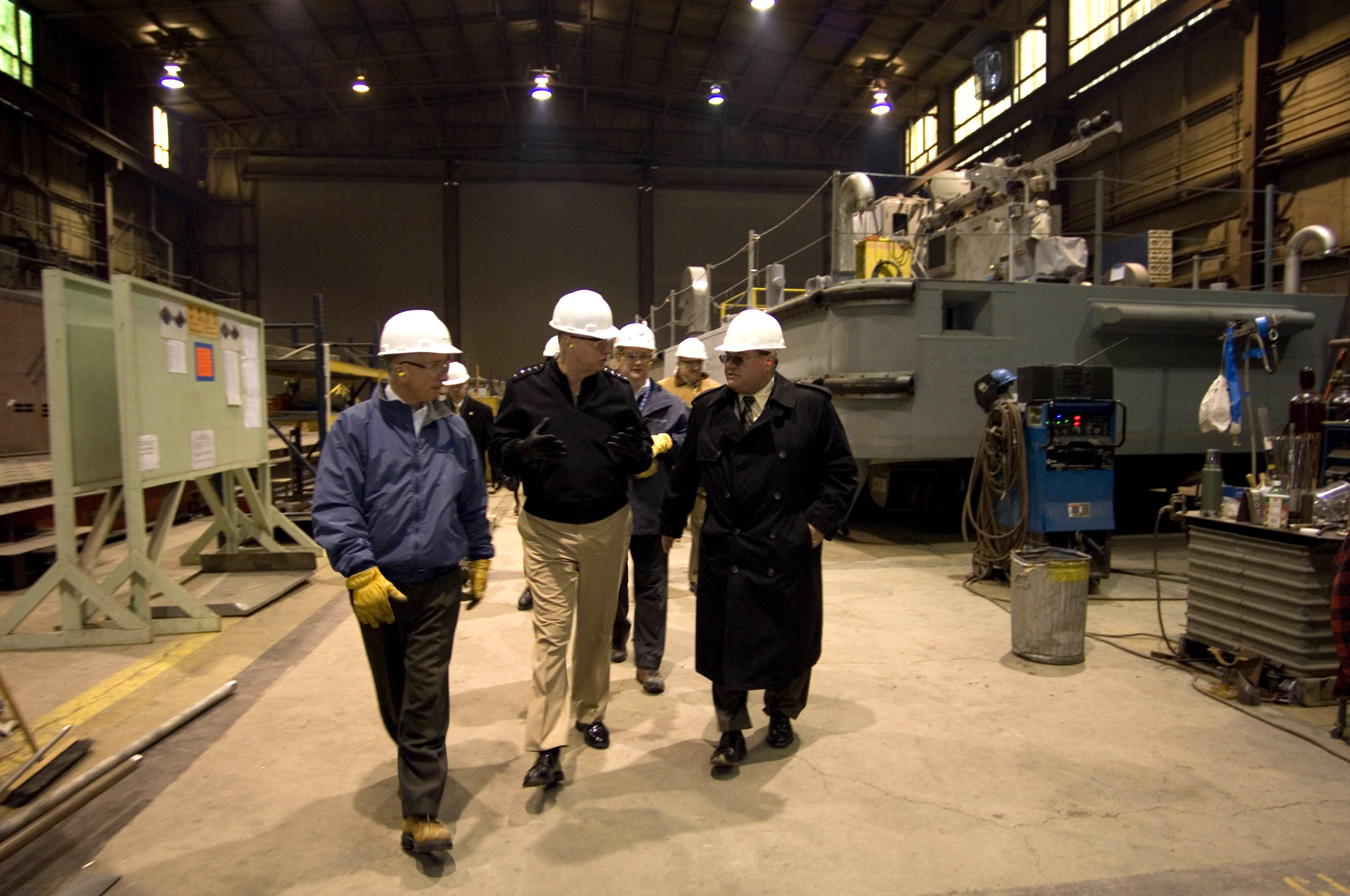
Chief of Naval Operations (CNO) Adm. Gary Roughead takes a tour of Marinette Marine Shipyard, 2008

Fincantieri Marinette Marine (FMM) is an American shipbuilding firm in Marinette, Wisconsin. Marinette Marine was a subsidiary of Manitowoc Marine Group of Wisconsin from 2000 to 2009, when it was sold to Fincantieri Marine Group.

== History ==
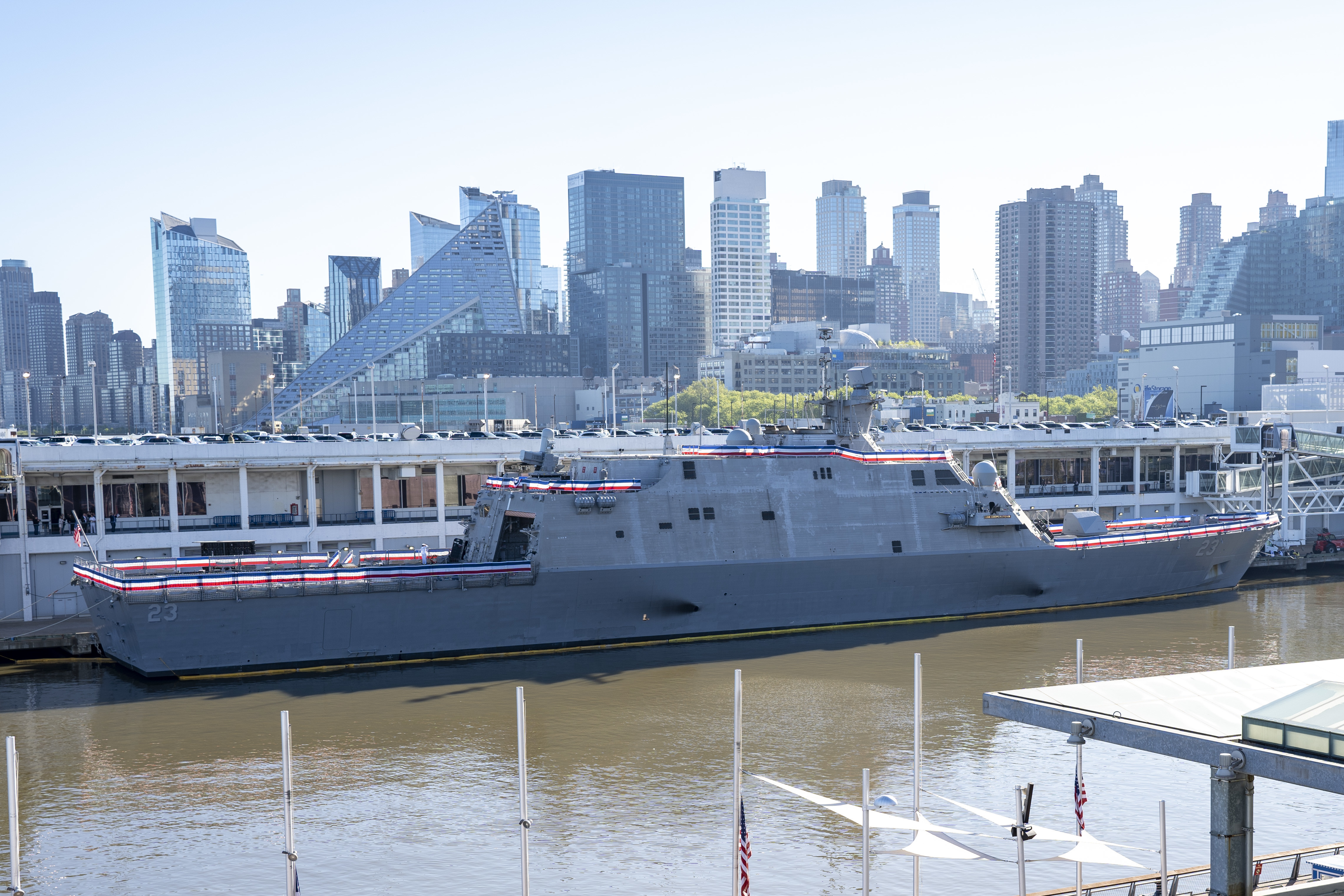
USS Cooperstown commissioned, 2023

Marinette Marine Corporation (MMC) was founded on the Menominee River in Marinette, Wisconsin, in 1942 as part of the growth in the American shipbuilding industry during World War II.

In 2000, Marinette Marine, a privately held company, was purchased by The Manitowoc Company for approximately $48 million. In August 2008, the Manitowoc Company announced that it had signed an agreement to sell their Manitowoc Marine Group division, which includes Marinette Marine, to Fincantieri Marine Group Holdings, Inc. and minority investor Lockheed Martin. The sale was completed in January 2009, to Fincantieri. The net purchase price in the all-cash deal was approximately $120 million.

Since its founding, Marinette Marine has produced more than 1,300 vessels. While primarily a producer of commercial vessels, it has also taken a number of contracts for the United States Navy, primarily for auxiliary vessels. Most recently, Marinette Marine became part of a team with Lockheed Martin to produce one of two littoral combat ship designs for the Navy, resulting in the launch of the USS Freedom in September 2006. In 2010, Marinette Marine bid for work on the Ship-to-Shore Connector, which would replace the Landing Craft Air Cushion (LCAC).

In April 2020, it was announced that Fincantieri Marinette Marine had won the contract to produce the United States Navy new Constellation-class multimission guided-missile frigate.

In 2019, Vice President Mike Pence and Secretary of Labor Eugene Scalia spoke at Marinette Marine Shipyard, praising the Trump administration's support for American manufacturing industries and vocational education. One year later, during the 2020 presidential election, President Donald Trump held a re-election rally at the shipyard, with Wisconsin State Assembly representatives John Nygren and Mary Felzkowski touting his administration's manufacturing policy, military expansion, and the United States–Mexico–Canada Agreement.

As of 2023, Fincantieri Marinette Marine is planning to overhaul and expand its yard facilities as part of winning a contract to construct the Constellation-class frigates. The changes will accommodate the larger size of the frigates versus the littoral combat ships, and will alter the way the yard launches ships.

== Facilities ==
All Marinette Marine facilities are located on the Menominee River in Marinette, Wisconsin. Some of the specific facilities they comprise are as follows:

- 300,000 square feet (30,000 m^{2}) of indoor ship construction space
- 53,000 square feet (4,900 m^{2}) of indoor warehousing and receiving space
- Ship launching facility for up to 4,500 long tons
- Ship transport system for up to 1,600 tons
- Ship module movers for up to 160 tons
- 275 ton yard crane
- 100 ton yard crane
- 40 ton yard cranes

== Ships and boats built ==
Ships built by Marinette Marine include:

- Constellation-class frigate, United States Navy
  - USS Constellation (FFG-62), on order
  - USS Congress (FFG-63), on order
  - USS Chesapeake (FFG-64), cancelled
  - USS Lafayette (FFG-65), cancelled
- Freedom-class littoral combat ship, United States Navy
  - USS Freedom (LCS-1), launched on 2 June 2005, delivered 2008, and decommissioned 29 September 2021
  - USS Fort Worth (LCS-3), launched 4 December 2010, delivered 2012
  - USS Milwaukee (LCS-5), launched 10 December 2013, delivered 2015, and decommissioned 8 September 2023
  - USS Detroit (LCS-7), launched 10 October 2014 and delivered 2016, and decommissioned 29 September 2023
  - USS Little Rock (LCS-9), launched 18 July 2015 and delivered 2017, and decommissioned 8 September 2023
  - USS Sioux City (LCS-11), launched 30 January 2016, delivered 2018, and decommissioned 14 August 2023
  - USS Wichita (LCS-13), launched 17 September 2016 and delivered 2018
  - USS Billings (LCS-15), launched 1 July 2017 and delivered 2019
  - USS Indianapolis (LCS-17), launched 18 April 2018 and delivered 2019
  - USS St. Louis (LCS-19), launched 15 December 2018 and delivered 2020
  - USS Minneapolis-Saint Paul (LCS-21), launched 15 June 2019 and delivered 2022
  - USS Cooperstown (LCS-23), launched 19 January 2020 and delivered 2023
  - USS Marinette (LCS-25), launched 31 October 2020 and delivered 2023
  - USS Nantucket (LCS-27), launched 7 August 2021 and delivered 2024
  - USS Beloit (LCS-29), launched 7 May 2022 and delivered 2024
  - USS Cleveland (LCS-31), launched 15 April 2023 and delivered 2026
- Multi-Mission Surface Combatant, Royal Saudi Naval Forces
  - TBD (four ships on order)
- Avenger-class mine countermeasures ship, United States Navy
  - USS Defender (MCM-2), launched in 1987
  - USS Champion (MCM-4), launched in 1989
  - USS Patriot (MCM-7), launched in 1990
- Powhatan-class tugboat, United States Navy
  - USNS Powhatan (T-ATF-166), launched in 1978
  - USNS Narragansett (T-ATF-167), launched in 1979
  - USNS Catawba (T-ATF-168), launched in 1979
  - USNS Navajo (T-ATF-169), launched in 1979
  - USNS Mohawk (T-ATF-170), launched in 1980
  - USNS Sioux (T-ATF-171), launched in 1980
  - USNS Apache (T-ATF-172), launched in 1981
- Natick-class tugboat, United States Navy
  - Manhattan (YTB-779), launched in 1965
  - Redwing (YTB-783), launched in 1965
  - Marinette (YTB-791), launched in 1967
  - Mecosta (YTB-818), launched in 1973
  - Wanamassa (YTB-820), launched in 1973
  - Canonchet (YTB-823), launched in 1973
  - Santaquin (YTB-824), launched in 1973
  - Dekanawida (YTB-831), launched in 1974
  - Skenandoa (YTB-835), launched in 1975
  - Pokagon (YTB-836), launched in 1975
- Juniper-class seagoing buoy tender, United States Coast Guard
  - USCGC Juniper (WLB-201), launched in 1995
  - USCGC Willow (WLB-202), launched in 1996
  - USCGC Kukui (WLB-203), launched in 1997
  - USCGC Elm (WLB-204), launched in 1997 or 1998
  - USCGC Walnut (WLB-205), launched in 1998
  - USCGC Spar (WLB-206), launched in 2000
  - USCGC Maple (WLB-207), launched in 2000 or 2001
  - USCGC Aspen (WLB-208), launched in 2001
  - USCGC Sycamore (WLB-209), launched in 2001
  - USCGC Cypress (WLB-210), launched in 2001
  - USCGC Oak (WLB-211), launched in 2002
  - USCGC Hickory (WLB-212), launched in 2002 or 2003
  - USCGC Fir (WLB-213), launched in 2003
  - USCGC Hollyhock (WLB-214), launched in 2003
  - USCGC Sequoia (WLB-215), launched in 2003
  - USCGC Alder (WLB-216), launched in 2004
- Keeper-class coastal buoy tender, United States Coast Guard
  - USCGC Ida Lewis (WLM-551), launched in 1995
  - USCGC Katherine Walker (WLM-552), launched in 1996
  - USCGC Abbie Burgess (WLM-553), launched in 1997
  - USCGC Marcus Hanna (WLM-554), launched in 1997
  - USCGC James Rankin (WLM-555), launched in 1998
  - USCGC Joshua Appleby (WLM-556), launched in 1998
  - USCGC Frank Drew (WLM-557), launched in 1998
  - USCGC Anthony Petit (WLM-558), launched in 1999
  - USCGC Barbara Mabrity (WLM-559), launched in 1999
  - USCGC William Tate (WLM-560), launched in 1999
  - USCGC Harry Claiborne (WLM-561), launched in 1999
  - USCGC Maria Bray (WLM-562), launched in 1999
  - USCGC Henry Blake (WLM-563), launched in 1999
  - USCGC George Cobb (WLM-564), launched in 1999
- USCGC Mackinaw, launched in 2005
- ARRV Sikuliaq launched October 2012
- NOAAS Reuben Lasker launched June 2012 and delivered 2013
- Staten Island Ferries, New York City Department of Transportation:
  - MV Guy V. Molinari, delivered 2004
  - MV Senator John J. Marchi, delivered 2005
  - MV Spirit of America, delivered 2005
- MV Ocean Reliance (2002) and MV Coastal Reliance (2002), pusher tugs for Crowley Maritime petroleum barges on the west coast.
- McClung-class landing ship medium, United States Navy
  - TBD (four ships on order)

== See also ==
- Category:Ships built by Marinette Marine
