= Marinette (YTB-791) =

Tugboat of the United States Navy

History

United States
- Ordered: 16 June 1966
- Builder: Marinette Marine, Marinette, Wisconsin
- Laid down: 8 September 1966
- Launched: 10 April 1967
- Acquired: 10 June 1967
- In service: 3 July 1967
- Stricken: 25 May 2005
- Fate: Sold by Defense Reutilization and Marketing Service (DRMS), 2 August 2006, to John VanPuffelen, Savanah Marine Services, Inc., for $125,000.

General characteristics
- Class & type: Natick-class large harbor tug
- Displacement: 283 long tons (288 t) (light); 356 long tons (362 t) (full)
- Length: 109 ft (33 m)
- Beam: 31 ft (9.4 m)
- Draft: 14 ft (4.3 m)
- Speed: 12 knots (14 mph; 22 km/h)
- Complement: 12
- Armament: None

Marinette (YTB‑791) was a United States Navy Natick-Class large district harbor tug named for Marinette, Wisconsin.

== Construction ==
The contract for Marinette was awarded 16 June 1966. She was laid down on 8 September 1966 at Marinette, Wisconsin, by Marinette Marine and launched 10 April 1967.

== Operational history ==
Placed in service 3 July 1967, Marinette was assigned to the 5th Naval District, headquartered at Norfolk, Virginia., until she was taken out of service in 2005.

Stricken from the Navy List 25 May 2005, Marinette was sold by Defense Reutilization and Marketing Service (DRMS) for reuse/conversion 2 August 2006.
