= USS Freedom (LCS-1) =

Freedom-class littoral combat ship of the US Navy

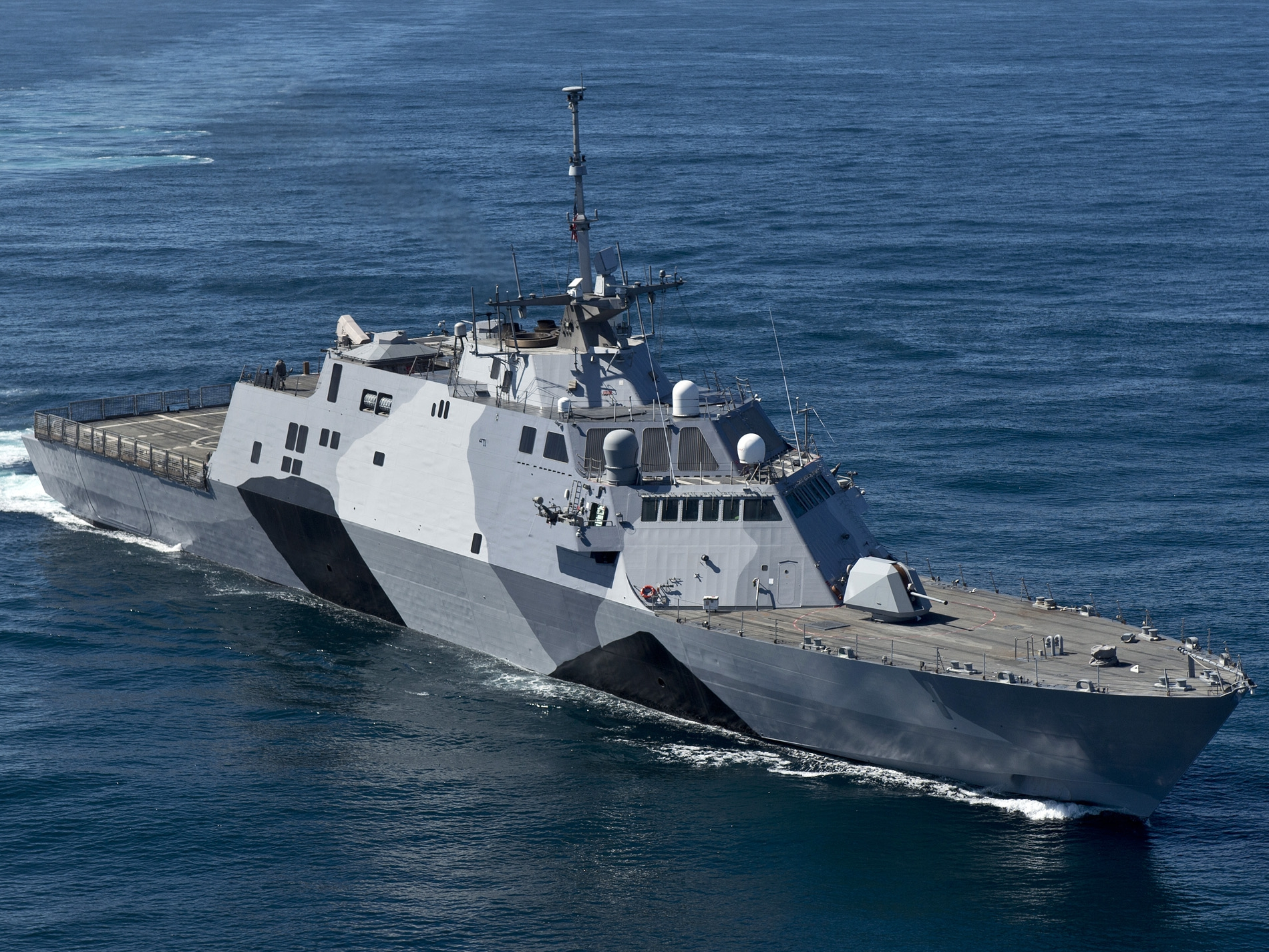
- USS Freedom in her new Measure 32 camouflage scheme on sea trials in February 2013, before her first deployment

History

United States
- Name: Freedom
- Namesake: Freedom
- Ordered: May 2004
- Awarded: 15 December 2004
- Builder: Marinette Marine
- Laid down: 2 June 2005
- Launched: 23 September 2006
- Commissioned: 8 November 2008
- Decommissioned: 29 September 2021
- Identification: Callsign: NFRE; Hull number: LCS-1
- Motto: Fast, Focused, Fearless
- Status: Decommissioned, in reserve
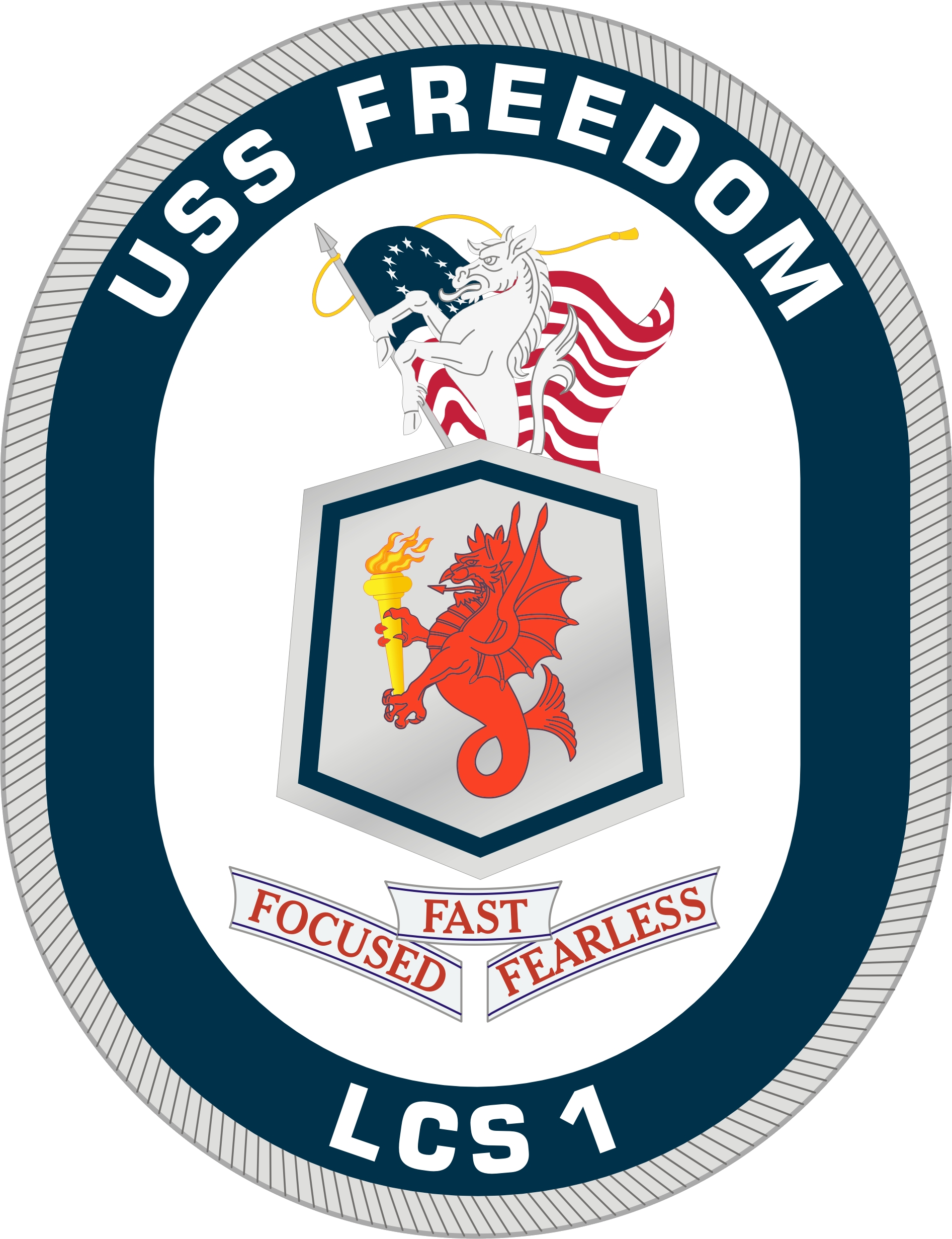
- Badge

General characteristics
- Class & type: Freedom-class littoral combat ship
- Displacement: 3,400 long tons (3,450 t) (full load)
- Length: 387.6 ft (118.1 m) LOA; 351 ft (107 m) LWL
- Beam: 57.7 ft (17.6 m)
- Draft: 14.1 ft (4.3 m)
- Installed power: CODAG: 2 × Rolls-Royce MT30 gas turbines (36 MW (48,000 hp) each); 2 × FM Colt-Pielstick 16PA6B STC diesel engines (6,480 kW (8,690 hp) each); Auxiliary power: 4 × Isotta-Fraschini V1708 diesel engines, Hitzinger generator units (800 kW (1,100 hp) each)
- Propulsion: 4 × Rolls-Royce waterjets
- Speed: 47 knots (87 km/h; 54 mph) (sea state 3)
- Range: 3,500 nmi (6,500 km; 4,000 mi) at 14 knots (26 km/h; 16 mph)
- Endurance: 21 days (336 hours)
- Boats & landing craft carried: 36 ft (11 m) Rigid-hulled inflatable boat; 40 ft (12 m) high-speed boats
- Complement: 50 core crew, 98 or more with mission package and air detachment crew (Blue and Gold crews)
- Sensors & processing systems: EADS TRS-3D 3D air and surface search radar; Lockheed Martin COMBATSS-21 combat management system; AN/SQR-20 Multi-Function Towed Array (As part of ASW mission module)
- Electronic warfare & decoys: Argon ST WBR-2000 ESM system; Terma A/S SKWS decoy system
- Armament: 1 × BAE Systems Mk 110 57 mm (2.2 in) gun.; 4 × .50 in (12.7 mm) cal. machine guns; 2 × Mk44 Bushmaster II 30 mm (1.2 in) guns; 21 × RIM-116 Rolling Airframe Missile Surface-to-Air Missiles; Other weapons as part of mission modules
- Aircraft carried: MH-60R/S Seahawk; MQ-8 Fire Scout
- Aviation facilities: Hangar bay

USS Freedom (LCS-1) is the lead ship of the Freedom-class littoral combat ship for the United States Navy. She is the third vessel to be so named after the concept of freedom. She is the design competitor produced by the Lockheed Martin consortium, in competition with the General Dynamics–designed USS Independence. She was officially accepted by the Supervisor of Shipbuilding Gulf Coast, on behalf of the US Navy, from the Lockheed Martin/Marinette Marine/Gibbs and Cox team, in Marinette, Wisconsin, on 18 September 2008.

She is designed for a variety of missions in shallow waters, minesweeping and humanitarian relief, capable against submarines and small ships, but not designed to take on large warships. The ship is a semi-planing monohull design capable of over 40 knots (74 km/h; 46 mph).

Commissioned in Milwaukee, Wisconsin, on 8 November 2008, Freedom was home-ported in San Diego, and assigned to Littoral Combat Ship Squadron One.

On 20 June 2020, the US Navy announced that they would be taking Freedom out of commission in March 2021, and placing her, along with Independence, Fort Worth, and Coronado in reserve. She was decommissioned on 29 September 2021.

== Design ==
Freedom is the first of two dramatically different LCS designs being produced; the other, USS Independence (LCS-2), is a trimaran built by a team led by General Dynamics' Bath Iron Works and Austal USA in Mobile, Alabama. Freedom is designed to be a fast, maneuverable, and networked surface combatant for missions such as anti-mine warfare, anti-submarine warfare, surface warfare and humanitarian relief.

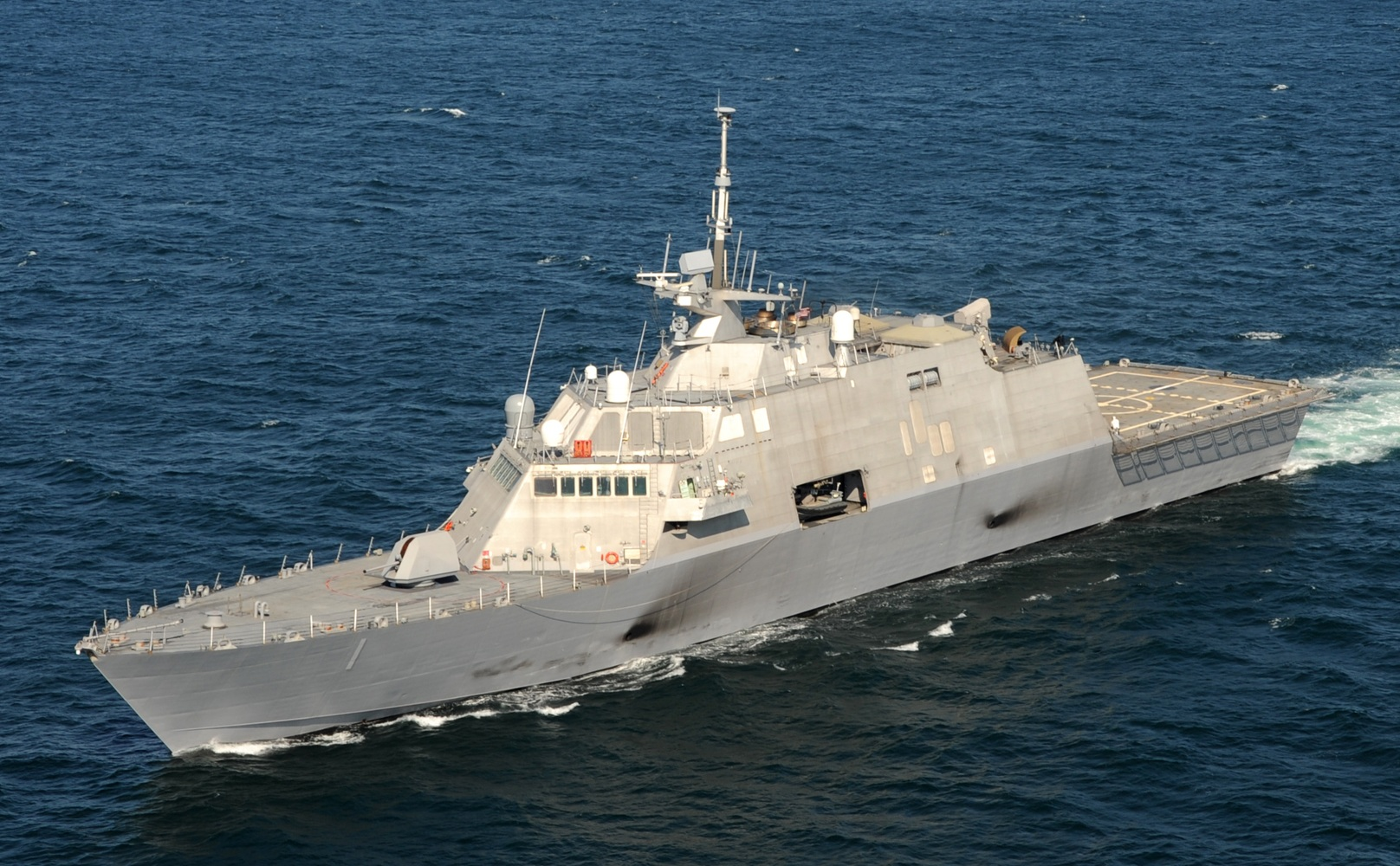
USS Freedom with original gray paint scheme in September 2009

The ship is a semi-planing steel monohull with an aluminum superstructure. The friction stir welded aluminum deckhouse is very flat which, combined with an angular design, makes it difficult for radar systems to detect. The ship is 387.6 ft (118 m) in length, displaces 3,400 long tons (3,450 t) fully loaded and can exceed 40 knots (74 km/h; 46 mph).

The design incorporates a large reconfigurable seaframe to allow rapidly interchangeable mission modules, a flight deck with integrated helicopter launch, recovery and handling system and the capability to launch and recover boats (crewed and uncrewed) from both the stern and side.

The flight deck is 1.5 times the size of that of a standard surface ship, and uses a Trigon traversing system to move helicopters in and out of the hangar. The ship has two ways to launch and recover various mission packages: a stern ramp and a starboard side door near the waterline. The mission module bay has a 3-axis crane for positioning modules or cargo. The fore deck has a modular weapons zone which can be used for a BAE Systems Mk 110 57 mm (2.2 in) gun mount or missile launcher. A Rolling Airframe Missile launcher is mounted above the hangar for short-range defense against aircraft and cruise missiles, and .50 caliber (12.7 mm) gun mounts are provided topside.

The core crew will be 40 sailors, usually joined by a mission package crew and an aviation detachment for a total crew of about 75. Automation allows a reduced crew, which greatly reduces operating costs, but workload can still be "grueling".

Four 800 kilowatts (1,100 hp) Fincantieri Isotta-Fraschini diesel generators provide 3.2 megawatts (4,300 hp) of electrical power to power the ship systems.

Freedom has relaxed stability so it can rapidly change course.

=== Concept of operations ===
The operational concept includes deployment of a two or three-ship squadron to operate in the littorals to counter anti-access forces and to support the operations of the U.S. Navy and other friendly surface ships. The operational concept is in direct support of the U.S. Navy's Maritime Strategy, "A Cooperative Strategy for 21st Century Seapower".

Principal capabilities include shallow-water anti-submarine warfare, mine countermeasures and defense against attacking small boats. LCS ships are to be networked to share tactical information with other units. Freedom will be initially based in San Diego with two crews which will alternate four-month tours of sea duty.

The Congressional Budget Office estimates that fuel will account for only "8 percent to 18 percent" of the total life-cycle costs for Freedom. Senator Jeff Sessions has called the report into question and has suggested that Independence, built in his state, would be more fuel efficient and that less frequent refuelings would affect military operations beyond the cost of fuel.

== Construction and career ==
=== Construction ===
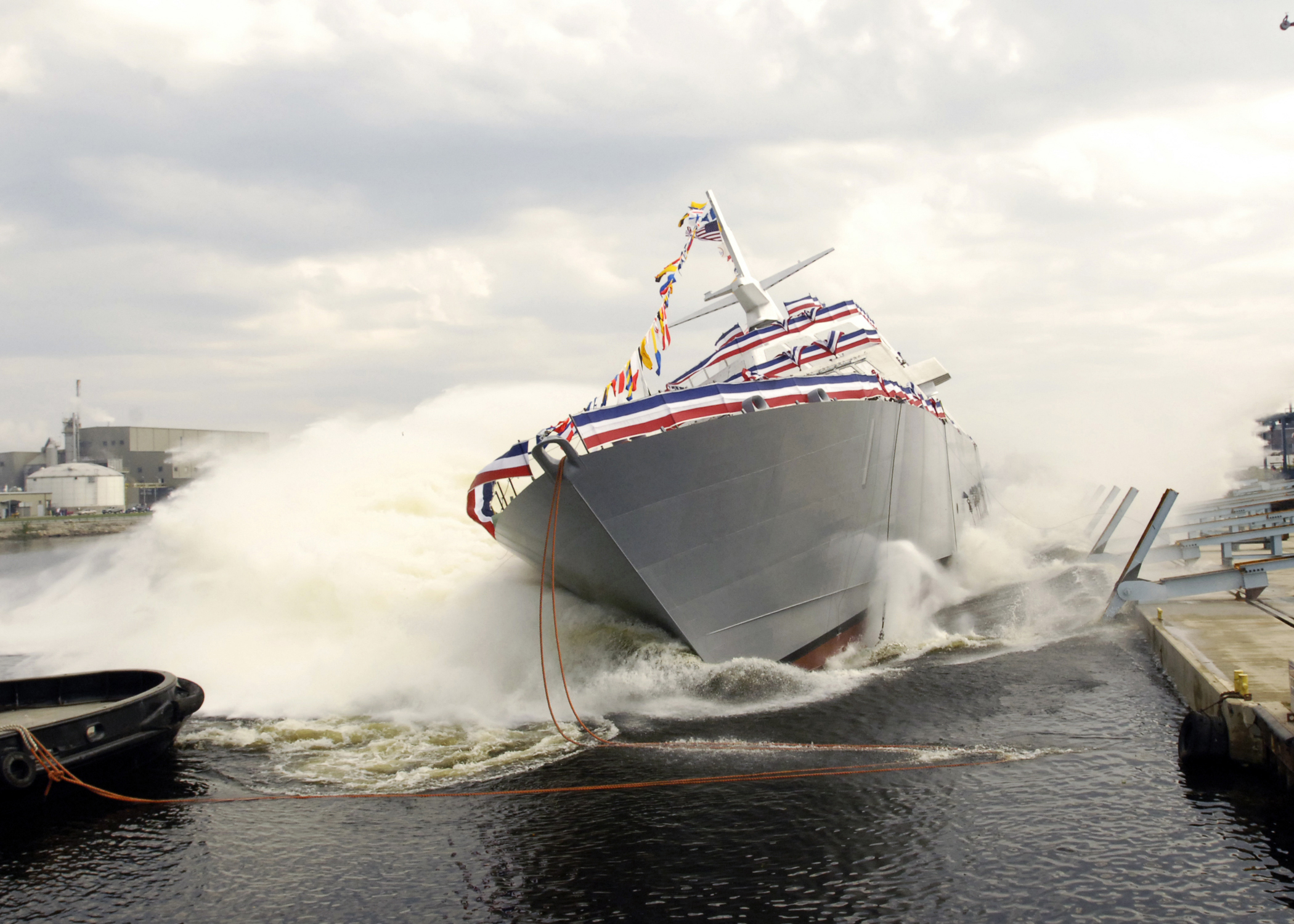
Side launch during her christening at the Marinette Marine shipyard.

The construction contract was awarded to Lockheed Martin's LCS team (Lockheed Martin, Gibbs & Cox, Marinette Marine, Bollinger Shipyards) on 15 December 2004. Her keel was laid down on 2 June 2005, by Marinette Marine in Marinette, Wisconsin. The ship was sponsored by Birgit Smith, the widow of United States Army Sergeant 1st Class Paul Ray Smith, who was posthumously awarded the Medal of Honor in Operation Iraqi Freedom. Her initials are welded on the ship's keel. The couple's Saint Christopher medal and wedding bands are embedded in the ship's mast.

Freedom was launched on 23 September 2006, cost overruns during Freedom's construction, combined with projected future overruns, led the government to issue a "Stop-work" in January 2007. On 25 April 2008, the New York Times ran a highly critical article, arguing that both Freedom and competitor Independence demonstrated a failure of the Navy's littoral combat ship program.

Prior to delivery, the U.S. Navy's Board of Inspection and Survey (INSURV) conducted acceptance trials aboard Freedom, 17–21 August. INSURV found the ship to be "capable, well-built and inspection-ready" and recommended that the Chief of Naval Operations authorize delivery of the ship. Because the trials were conducted in Lake Michigan, some ship systems, including aviation and combat systems, could not be demonstrated. Systems not demonstrated during the trials were to be presented to INSURV in early 2009 trials in Norfolk, and in the open ocean. The inspection discovered 2,600 total discrepancies, of which 21 were considered high-priority deficiencies.

"As part of LCS 1 acceptance trials, the Navy’s Board of Inspection and Survey (INSURV) identified 21 critical 'starred' deficiencies and recommended the Chief of Naval Operations authorize delivery of LCS-1 after correction or waiver of these deficiencies. According to Navy officials, only 9 of these deficiencies were corrected prior to delivery. Navy officials report that transiting the ship away from Marinette, Wisconsin, prior to the winter freeze was a higher priority than timely correction of starred deficiencies. The Navy intends to correct remaining deficiencies during planned post-delivery maintenance availabilities."

One of the issues with the ship is that it is six percent overweight and therefore more likely to sink if damaged. This seems to have been caused by design changes during construction. The Navy says that the ship will require special operating procedures until this is corrected. The workaround selected will be to install external tanks for additional buoyancy. The Navy stated that Freedom now meets the damage stability requirement with the addition of the external tanks and that the design of USS Fort Worth (LCS-3) includes additional stability improvements.

Other issues include difficulty with the slow speed operations required for deep sea refueling, no ability to UNREP other supplies aboard other than by helicopter, and problems with side-door launches of remotely operated vehicles.

Freedom was delivered to the Navy on 18 September 2008, and commissioned in Milwaukee, on 8 November 2008, Commanders Donald D. Gabrielson, (CO Blue) and Michael P. Doran, (CO Gold) in command.

On 12 June 2009, the Navy confirmed that Chief of Naval Operations Admiral Gary Roughead, had ordered a study of an early deployment of Freedom, before the expected date of 2012. Anonymous sources inside Lockheed Martin, reported that Roughead, wanted to use the first LCS to patrol for pirates off the coast of Somalia.

On 13 October 2009, the Department of Defense announced Freedom would be deployed two years ahead of schedule. For this deployment 20 additional sailors will be carried for Visit, Board, Search, and Seizure operations in two shipping containers in the mission module cargo area. These containers will not include sanitary facilities, so they will be forced to use the ones in the ship's berthing spaces. About half of the 20 member boarding team will be temporarily replaced with United States Coast Guard law enforcement officers for some portion of the deployment. John C. Harvey, Jr., said that while the deployment was a success, manning may need adjustment.

=== Operations ===
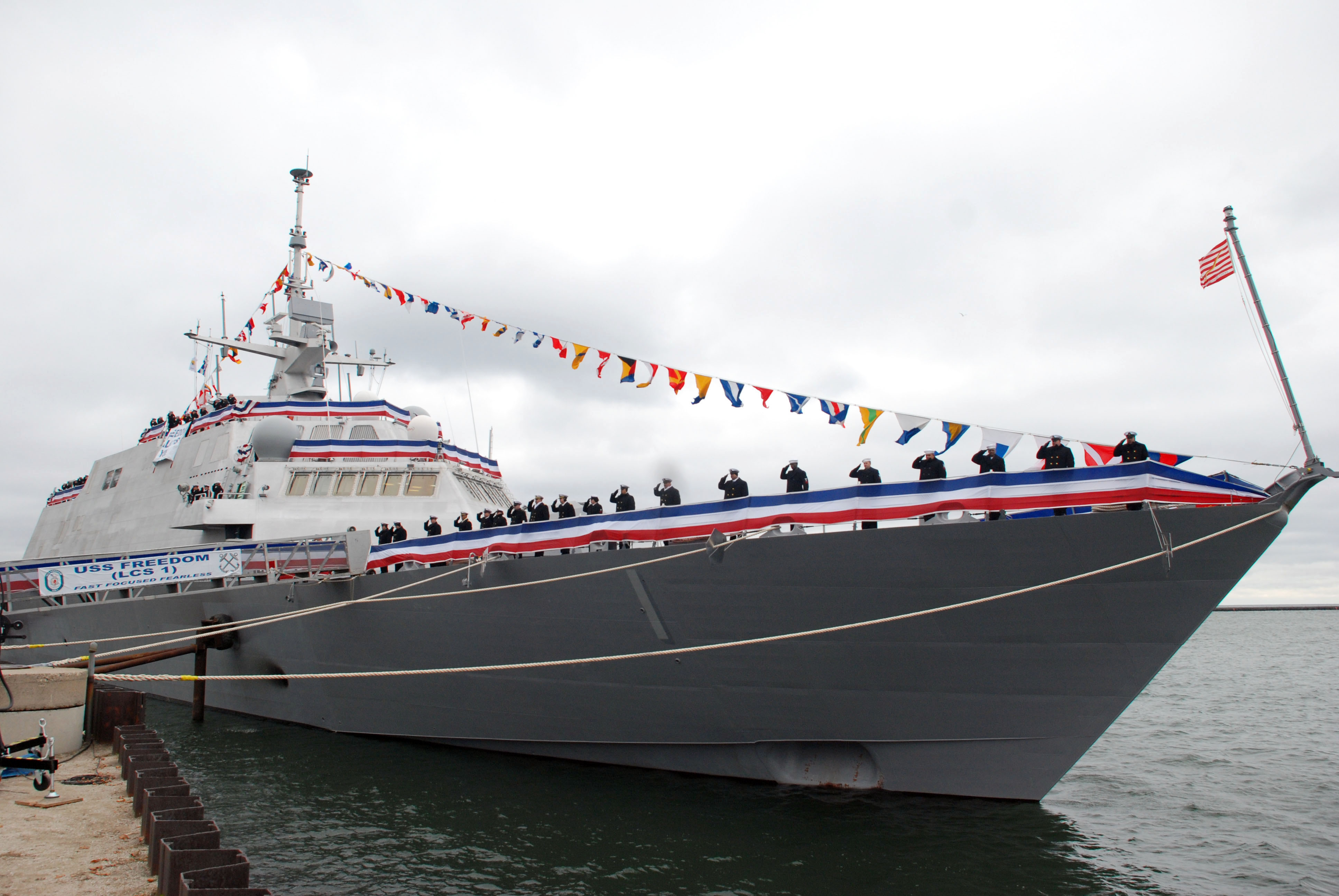
LCS-1 during commissioning in 2008

In her limited time at sea, Freedom has been "plagued by flawed designs and failed equipment since being commissioned, has at least 17 known cracks, and has repeatedly been beset by engine-related failures".

On 15 February 2010, Freedom set sail from Naval Station Mayport on its first deployment to support SOUTHCOM operations. On 22 February, off the coast of Colombia, the ship pursued a possible drug-running boat. The boat fled back into Colombian coastal waters and Freedom's crew recovered 500 lb (230 kg) of cocaine that had been dumped overboard by the boat's crew.

On 4 April 2010, Freedom entered the 3rd Fleet area of responsibility; carrying Helicopter Sea Combat Squadron 22, Det. 2, a LCS Surface Warfare Mission Package, and a U.S. Coast Guard Law Enforcement Detachment.

She was expected to be dry docked in San Diego's Nassco shipyard so that her outer starboard waterjet could be replaced.

On 12 September 2010, the starboard Rolls-Royce MT30 gas turbine broke down and the ship had to rely on her diesel engines to return to port. CNO Roughead said that the media had overhyped the issue and that such breakdowns were not uncommon.

During a heavy-weather ocean trial in February 2011, the ship developed a six-inch (150 mm) crack in its hull that leaked 5 US gallons (19 L) of water an hour. The Navy proceeded to investigate, the problem appearing to be due to faulty welds rather than a design error. The repairs were scheduled to begin on 27 June 2011, and last until 19 September.

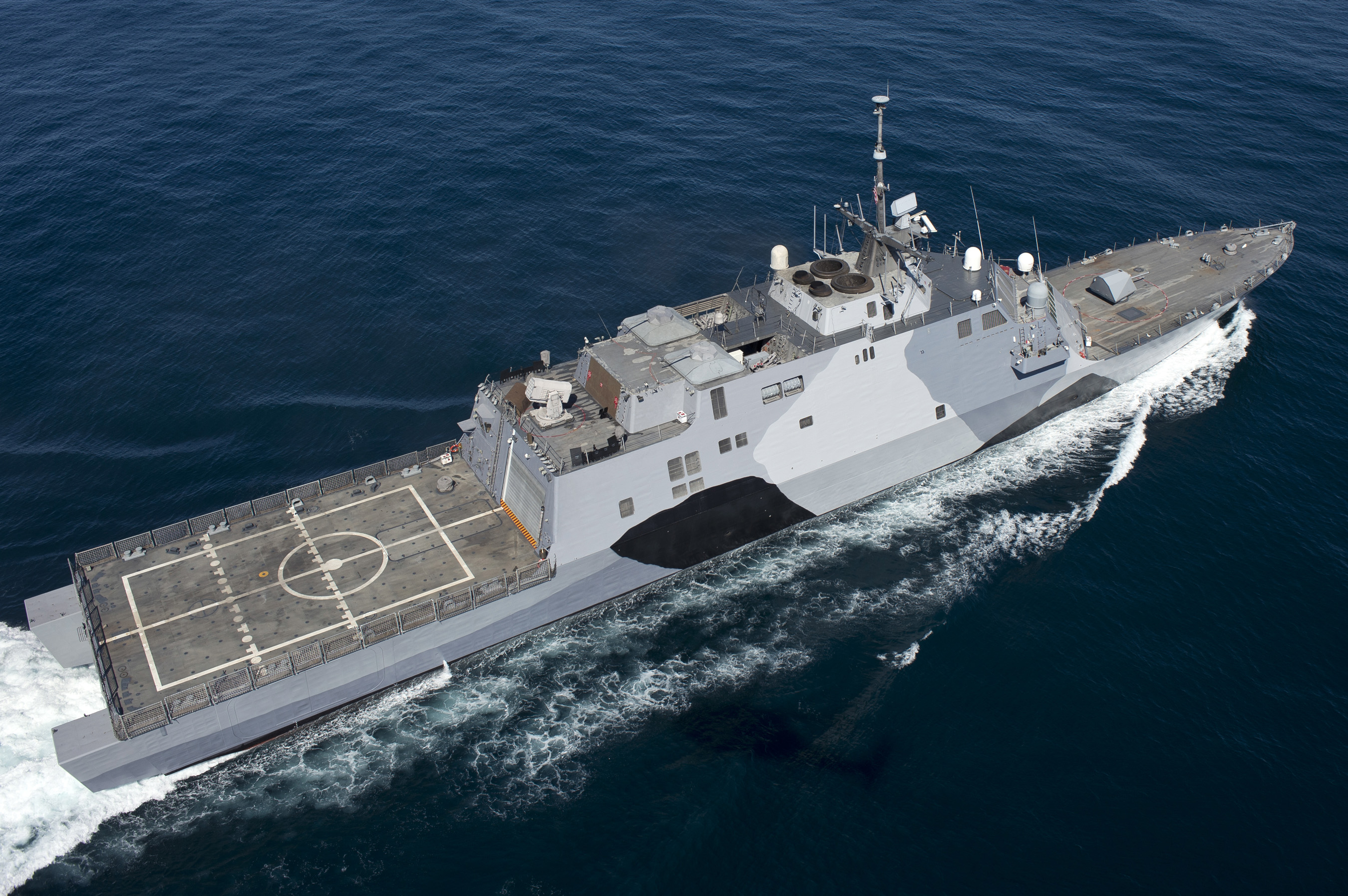
USS Freedom showing her large helideck and RAM launcher on the hangar.

In February 2012, Freedom suffered minor flooding while underway off Southern California. An inflatable boot seal was deployed in a successful effort to contain the flooding, and the ship returned to San Diego, on its own power. This marked a return to the dry dock before the ship even completed its last post-repair shakedown. A "special trial" conducted in May 2012, found the ship fit for the deployment.

In July 2012, Freedom was dry docked in order to expand berthing by 20 and for firefighting and boat handling improvements. After another docking to apply a new paint scheme and apply another fix for the aft ramp, she departed for Singapore, with a core crew of 50, plus 3 trainees, plus a mission crew with berthing for 98. Additional crew above that level will again be bedded in the cargo spaces.

On 15 January 2013, the U.S. Defense Department's director of operational test and evaluation released a judgement of the LCS in an annual study. The report said that Freedom was "not expected to be survivable" in combat. Helicopters on board the ship cannot tow its mine-hunting sensors, so it must rely on uncrewed systems for mine countermeasures, although those systems are not in service, and will not be for several years. Her 30 mm (1.2 in) Mk44 Bushmaster IIs "exhibit reliability problems". The 57 mm Mk 110 gun is differently designed on the Freedom class, which cause vibrations at high speeds that make accurate firing difficult. The integrated weapons systems and air/surface search radar have "performance deficiencies" that affect the ship's "tracking and engagement of contacts".

In early 2013, the vessel took part in the National Geographic TV movie Inside: 21st Century Warship along with Independence.

Freedom left for a 10-month deployment to Singapore, in March 2013. On 11 March 2013, Freedom became the first LCS to reach Hawaii. On 16 March, while en route to Singapore, the ship briefly lost power when one of the diesel engines shut down. On 18 April, Freedom arrived at the Changi Naval Base in Singapore, set to participate in joint military exercises. On 18–19 May, Freedom participated in the Republic of Singapore Navy's Open House 2013 at Changi Naval Base. Visitors to the Open House were allowed to board and visit Freedom. On 21 May, Freedom's first venture from Singapore harbor was cut short by another equipment failure, followed on 20 July 2013, by another breakdown requiring a return to port. The frequent breakdowns found the crew short of the Navy's sleep requirement, even with the maximum possible core crew and help from contractors and the mission module crew. Although billed as a trip for training and international cooperation exercises, Freedom conducted standard patrols while in the South China Sea. Despite suffering several breakdowns, the deployment was deemed a success from a research and development platform standpoint; while deployed for 10 months, the ship had 70 percent availability, on par with most other forward deployed ships in the fleet.

In November 2013, Freedom delivered relief supplies to the Philippines, in the wake of Typhoon Haiyan, from 16 nmi (30 km; 18 mi) off shore, using her own and another ship's helicopters.

From 25 April–16 May 2014, Freedom conducted the future concept of operations (CONOPS) for crewed and uncrewed helicopters aboard littoral combat ships. Operations had the crewed MH-60R working together with the uncrewed MQ-8B Fire Scout. The demonstration included one MH-60R/S Seahawk and one MQ-8B flying with the surface warfare (SUW) mission package installed, intended to provide fleet protection against small boats and asymmetric threats.

In March 2015, Freedom completed rough water trials to demonstrate seaworthiness and structural integrity, collecting data while operating in sea states 5 and 6 for 11 days.

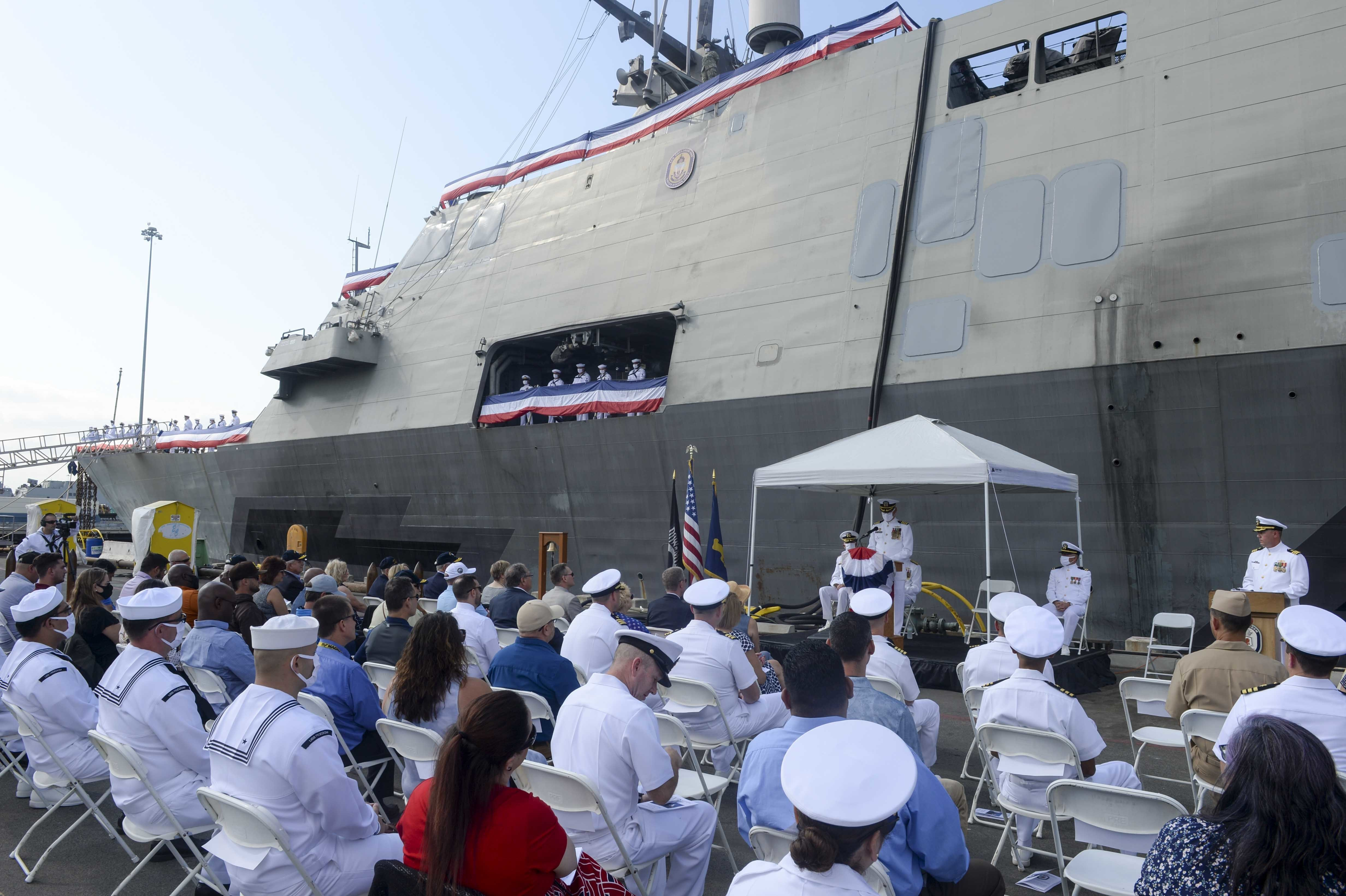
USS Freedom's last commanding officer speaking during the ship's decommissioning ceremony, September 2021

=== Decommission ===
In February 2020, it was announced that the Navy plans to retire Freedom and her sister ship Fort Worth after 12 and 8 years of service respectively. On 20 June 2020, the Navy announced that Freedom would be decommissioned on 21 March 2021. In February 2021, then Navy pushed back Freedom's decommissioning to 30 September 2021.

As of February 2024, ex-Freedom is docked at the Puget Sound Naval Shipyard in Bremerton, Washington alongside the Independence-class LCS USS Coronado.
