= USCGC Spar =

USCGC Spar is the name of two United States Coast Guard buoy tenders:

- USCGC Spar (WLB-403), commissioned in 1944, decommissioned in 1997 and scuttled
- USCGC Spar (WLB-206), commissioned in 2001
