= USCGC Florence Finch =

United States Coast Guard ship

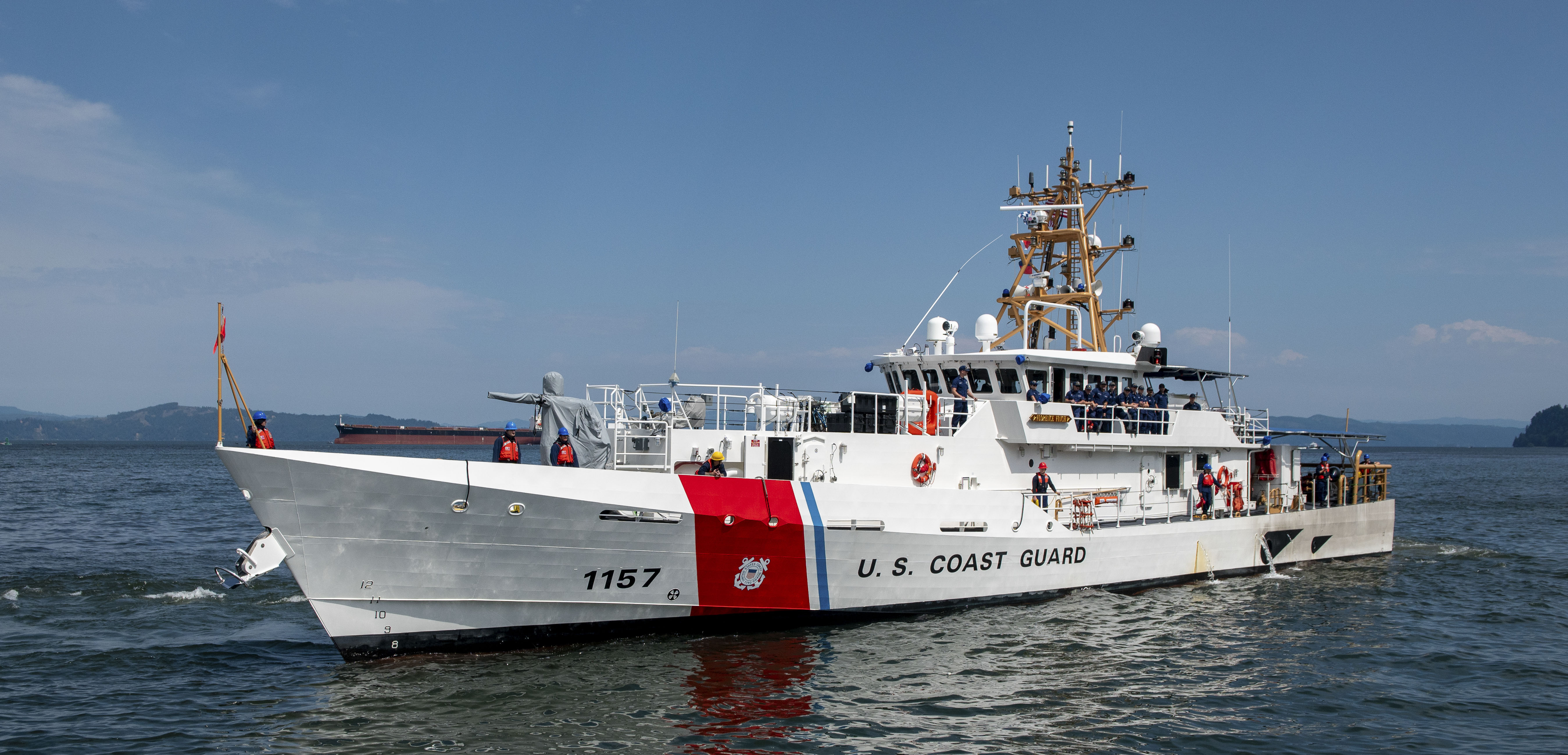
- USCGC Florence Finch in 2024

History

United States
- Name: Florence Finch
- Namesake: Florence Finch
- Operator: United States Coast Guard
- Builder: Bollinger Shipyards, Lockport, Louisiana
- Commissioned: 24 October 2024
- Home port: Astoria, Oregon
- Identification: Call Sign NFEF; MMSI number: 338926457
- Status: in active service
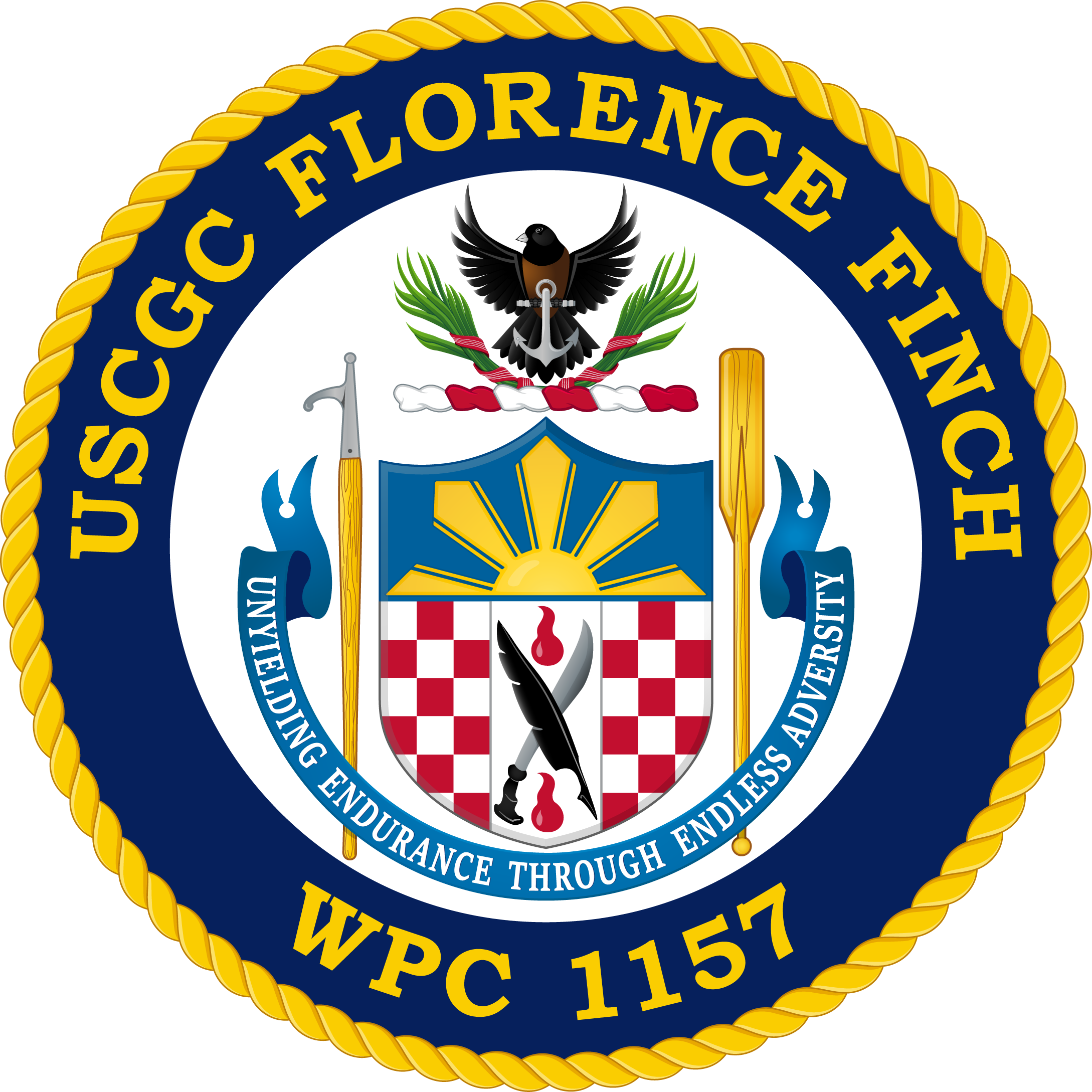
- Badge

General characteristics
- Class & type: Sentinel-class cutter
- Displacement: 353 long tons (359 t)
- Length: 153.5 ft (46.8 m)
- Beam: 25.43 ft (7.75 m)
- Draft: 8.46 ft (2.58 m)
- Propulsion: 2 × 4,300 kW (5,800 shp); 1 × 75 kW (101 shp) bow thruster
- Speed: 28 knots (52 km/h; 32 mph)
- Range: 2,500 nautical miles (4,600 km; 2,900 mi)
- Endurance: 5 days
- Boats & landing craft carried: 1 × Over the Horizon cutter boat
- Complement: 4 officers, 20 crew
- Armament: 1 × Mk 38 25 mm autocannon; 4 × crew-served Browning M2 machine guns

USCGC Florence Finch is the United States Coast Guard's 57th Sentinel-class cutter. She supports multiple Coast Guard missions including port, waterway and coastal security, fishery patrols, drug and illegal immigrant law enforcement, search and rescue, and national defense operations. She was launched in 2024 and is assigned to Coast Guard Sector Columbia River. The ship is based in Astoria, Oregon.

== Construction and characteristics ==
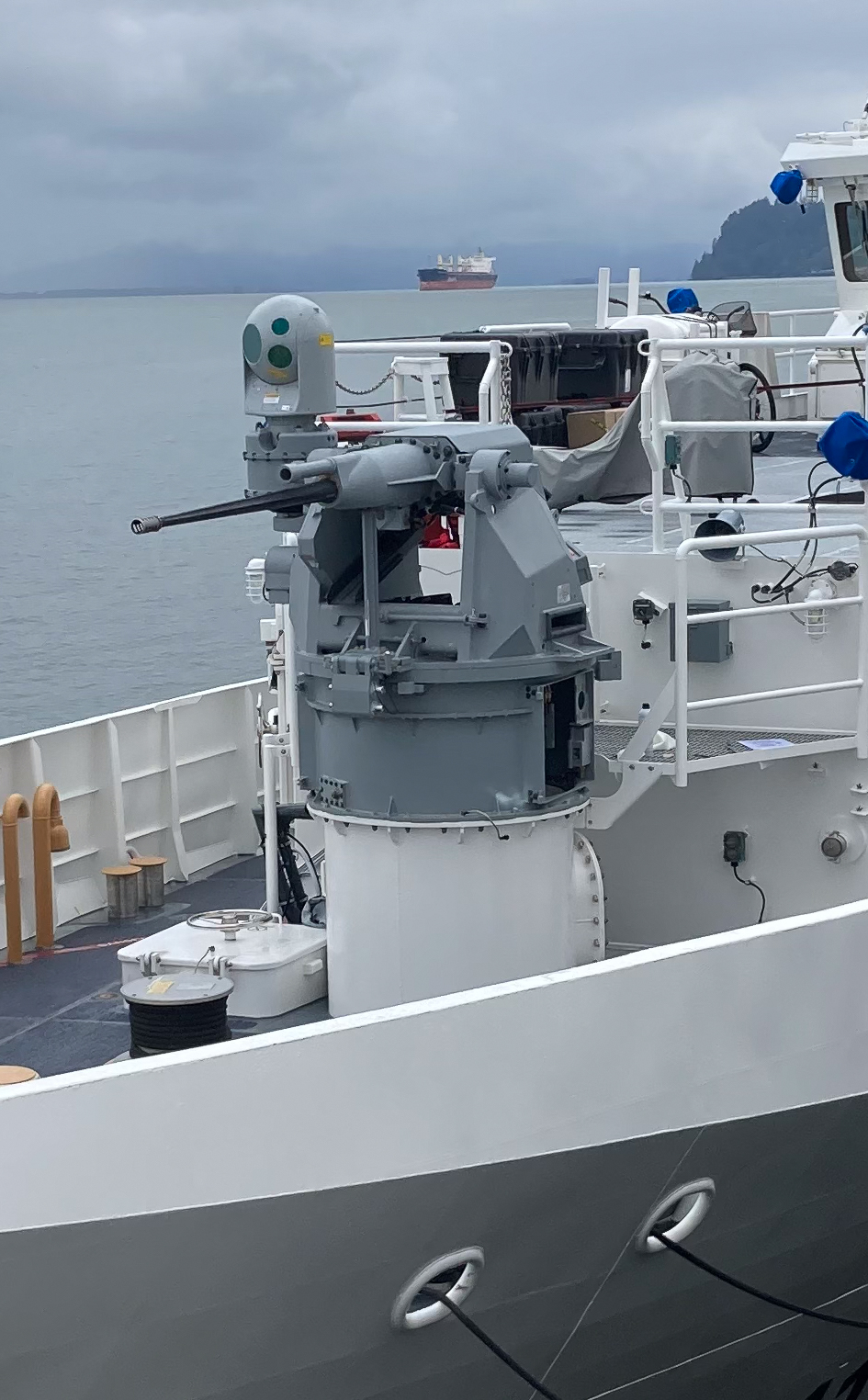
Mk 38 25mm autocannon on Florence Finch

On 26 September 2008 the Coast Guard awarded a contract to Bollinger Shipyards for the lead ship in the Sentinel class which would replace the aging Island class. This contract included options to build an additional 33 ships. The Coast Guard exercised all the options and, in May 2016, awarded Bollinger a new contract with options for 26 more of the cutters, including Florence Finch. The average cost of the ships under contract at that point was approximately $65 million.

Florence Finch was built by Bollinger Shipyards in Lockport, Louisiana. On 13 June 2024, she was delivered to the Coast Guard at Key West, Florida. Florence Finch was commissioned at a ceremony at U.S. Coast Guard Base Seattle on 24 October 2024. It was attended by Betty Murphy, Florence Finch's daughter, and Rear Admiral Charles Fosse, commander of the 13th Coast Guard District.

Florence Finch is 153.5 feet (46.8 m) long, with a beam of 25.43 feet (7.75 m), and a full-load draft of 8.46 feet (2.58 m). She displaces 353 tons when fully loaded. Her hull is built of welded steel plates, while her superstructure is made of aluminum.

The ship is propelled by two Tier II 20-cylinder mtu 20 V 4000 M93L Diesel engines which produce 5,676 horsepower each. These drive two six-bladed fixed-pitch propellers. This propulsion package gives her a continuous cruising speed of 28 knots. Her fuel tanks hold over 17,000 US gallons (64,000 L) giving Florence Finch an unrefueled range of 2,500 nautical miles at 15 knots. The ship is equipped with a Schottel STT 60K bow thruster.

Electrical power aboard is provided by two main ship-service generators and an emergency generator. The two ship service generators are Cummins QSM-11-DM Diesel engines driving Stanford 317 Kw generators. The emergency unit, which is housed in a separate room, is a Cummins 6BTA5.9-DM Diesel engine driving a Stanford 93 Kw generator.

The ship is equipped with Quantum QC1500 fin stabilizers to reduce rolling. Potable water can be produced from seawater with an onboard desalination plant. Satellite television is available in the crew mess area.

She is armed with a remotely-controlled, gyro-stabilized Mark 38 25 mm autocannon, four crew served M2 Browning machine guns, and light arms.

Florence Finch, like all the Sentinel-class cutters, is equipped with a stern launching ramp, that allows her to launch and retrieve a 26 feet (7.9 m)-long Over-the-Horizon cutter boat without first coming to a stop. Her cutter boat is useful for inspecting other vessels, and deploying boarding parties. As its top speed is 40 knots, it can pursue vessels which attempt to flee. It is equipped with an inboard Diesel engine which propels the boat by a jet drive.

Florence Finch has a crew of 24 men and women. The Sentinel class was designed to accommodate mixed-gender crews, with small staterooms rather than large bunk rooms and individual heads. The captain and executive officer have private staterooms.

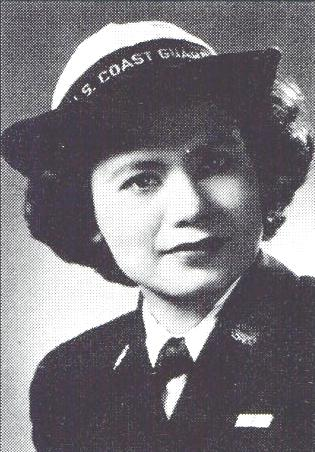
Florence Finch, the ship's namesake

Each cutter in the Sentinel class is named after an enlisted hero. The ship's namesake is Florence Finch, a Philippine resistance fighter who was captured and tortured by the Japanese during World War II. After the war, she moved to the United States and enlisted in the United States Coast Guard Women's Reserve.

== Operational career ==
Florence Finch and sister ship USCGC David Durien replaced USCGC Alert and USCGC Steadfast in Astoria in 2024. She will operate primarily in the Pacific Ocean, Puget Sound, the Strait of Juan de Fuca, and the Columbia River.
