= USCGC Stratton =

Legend-class cutter of the United States Coast Guard

USCGC Stratton (WMSL-752)
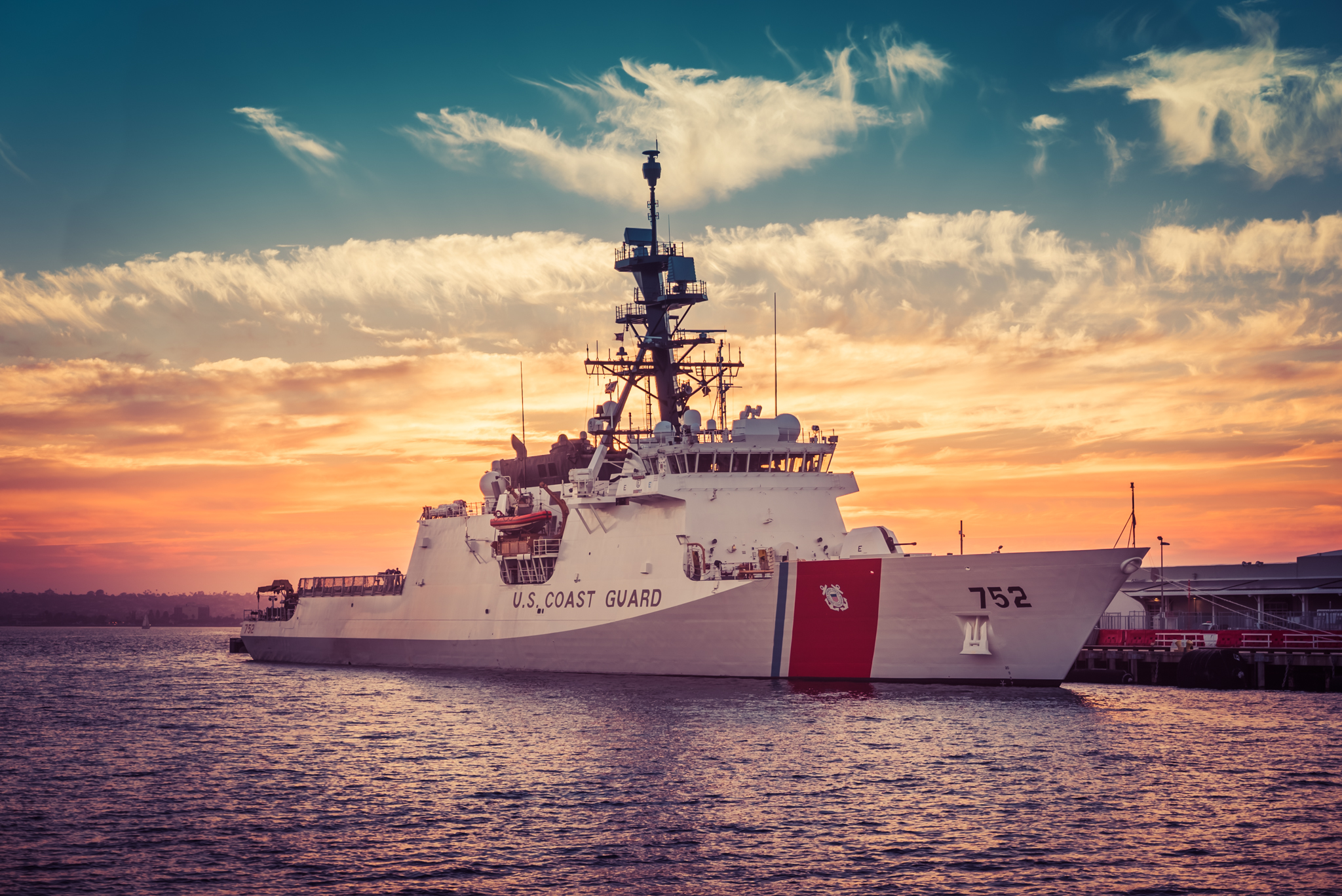
- USCGC Stratton in 2016

History

United States
- Namesake: Dorothy C. Stratton
- Ordered: January 2001
- Builder: Northrop Grumman Shipbuilding, Pascagoula, Mississippi
- Laid down: July 20, 2009
- Launched: July 23, 2010
- Sponsored by: Michelle Obama
- Christened: July 23, 2010
- Acquired: September 2, 2011
- Commissioned: March 31, 2012
- Identification: MMSI number: 368798000; Call sign: NHTC
- Motto: "We Can't Afford Not To"
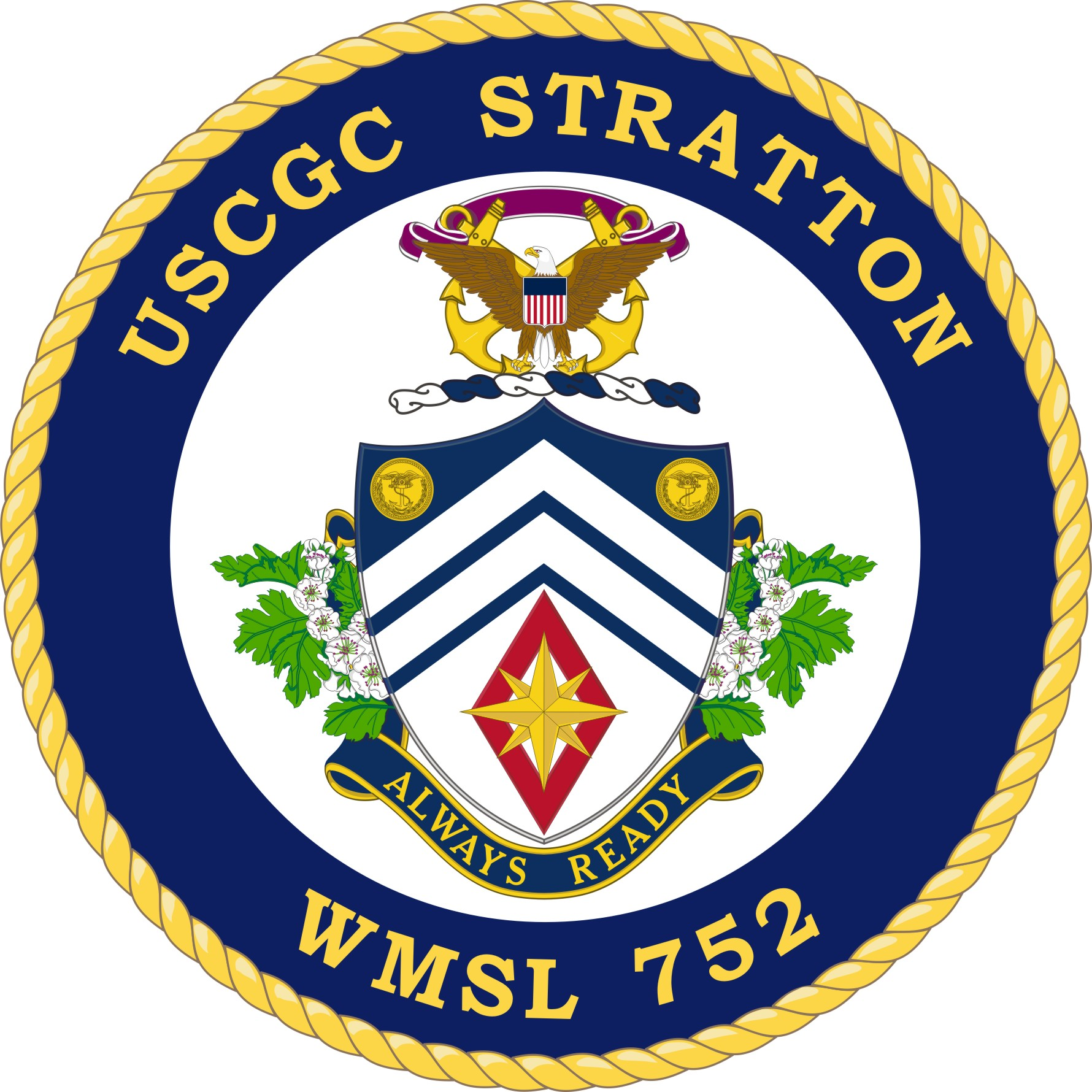
- Badge

General characteristics
- Type: United States Coast Guard Cutter
- Displacement: 4,500 long tons (4,600 t)
- Length: 418 feet (127 m)
- Beam: 54 feet (16 m)
- Draft: 22.5 feet (6.9 m)
- Installed power: 3 x Caterpillar 3512B diesel generators
- Propulsion: Combined diesel and gas; 2 × 7,400 kW (9,900 hp) MTU 20V 1163 diesels; 1 × 22 MW (30,000 hp) LM2500 gas turbine engine
- Speed: Over 28 knots (52 km/h; 32 mph)
- Range: 12,000 nautical miles (22,000 km; 14,000 mi)
- Endurance: 60 days
- Complement: 113 (14 officers + 99 enlisted) and can carry up to 148 depending on mission
- Sensors & processing systems: EADS 3D TRS-16 AN/SPS-75 Air Search Radar; SPQ-9B Fire Control Radar; AN/SPS-79 Surface Search Radar; AN/SLQ-32B(V)2; AN/UPX-29A IFF; AN/URN-25 TACAN; MK 46 Mod 1 Optical Sighting System; Furuno X and S-band radars; Components of the Lockheed Martin COMBATSS-21 combat management system; Link-11 communication system
- Electronic warfare & decoys: AN/SLQ-32B(V)2 Electronic Warfare System; 2 × SRBOC/ 2 × NULKA countermeasures chaff/rapid decoy launchers
- Armament: 1 × MK 110 57 mm gun a variant of the Bofors 57 mm gun and Gunfire Control System; 1 × 20 mm Block 1B Baseline 2 Phalanx Close-In Weapons System; 4 × crew-served .50-caliber (12.7 mm) Browning M2 machine guns; 2 × crew-served M240B 7.62 mm machine guns; Designed for but not with additional weapons and sensors
- Armor: Ballistic protection for main gun
- Aircraft carried: 1 × MH-65C Dolphin MCH and 2 × sUAS
- Aviation facilities: 50-by-80-foot (15 m × 24 m) flight deck, hangar for all aircraft

USCGC Stratton (WMSL-752) is the third Legend-class cutter of the United States Coast Guard. It is the first "white hull" cutter named after a woman since the 1980s (USCGC Harriet Lane was launched in 1984). Stratton is named for Coast Guard Captain Dorothy C. Stratton (1899–2006). Stratton served as director of the SPARS, the Coast Guard Women's Reserve during World War II.

== History ==
Construction began in 2008 by Northrop Grumman's Ship System Ingalls Shipyard in Pascagoula, Mississippi. The keel was laid on July 20, 2009. The cutter's sponsor is Michelle Obama, who is the first First Lady to sponsor a Coast Guard cutter.

On 23 July 2010 Michelle Obama christened the cutter in a ceremony at the ship builder's.

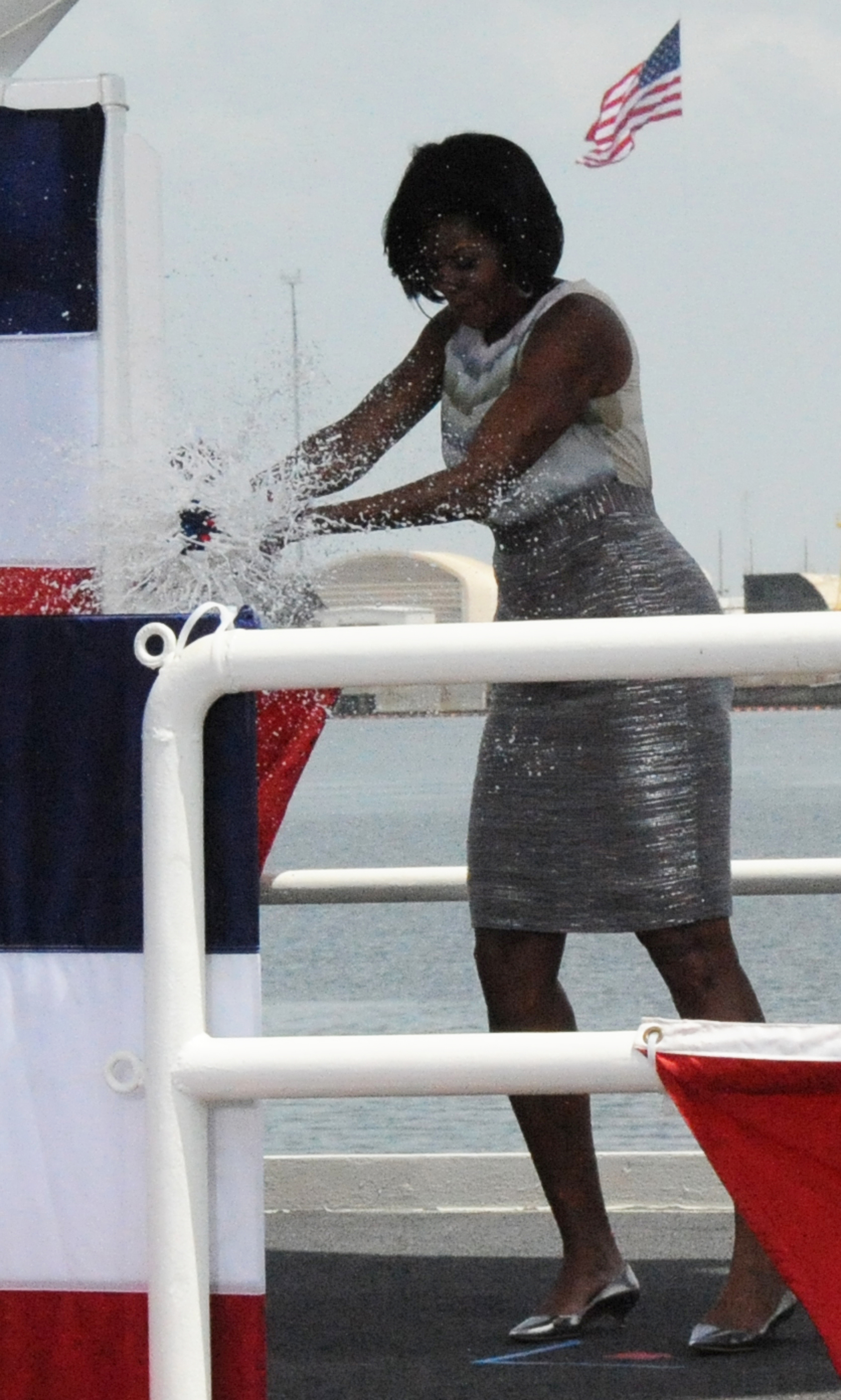
Michelle Obama chrisening Stratton

In August 2011, Stratton completed sea trials. On September 2, 2011 Stratton was acquired by the Coast Guard. On December 19, 2011 Stratton arrived in San Francisco, pier 27, for its inaugural homecoming visit to the Bay Area.

On March 31, 2012, Stratton was officially commissioned by the Coast Guard in Alameda, California, with First Lady Michelle Obama in attendance.

In April 2012, the crew of Stratton discovered four holes in the hull and the ship was sent to drydock to have these repaired.

On July 18, 2015, Stratton intercepted a semi-submersible loaded with approximately 16,000 pounds of cocaine. Stratton was able to offload more than 12,000 pounds worth an estimated $181 million before the craft sank. It is estimated to be the largest such seizure of its kind.

In July 2015, Insitu UAS demonstrated how ScanEagle can maximize the effectiveness of USCG vessels, the exercise also showcased the platform's ability to conduct seamless, concurrent aviation operations with crewed aircraft.

On June 13, 2019, Stratton departed for a Western Pacific patrol in support of the U.S. Indo-Pacific Command where the cutter would operate under tactical control of the United States Seventh Fleet commander. During this patrol, Stratton would enforce United Nations Security Council resolutions against the Democratic People's Republic of Korea, combat illegal fishing, conduct capacity-building exercises with navies and coast guards, and would also participate in various military exercises and training's, including Maritime Training Activity Malaysia 2019, Cooperation Afloat Readiness and Training Indonesia 2019, and Exercise Talisman Saber.

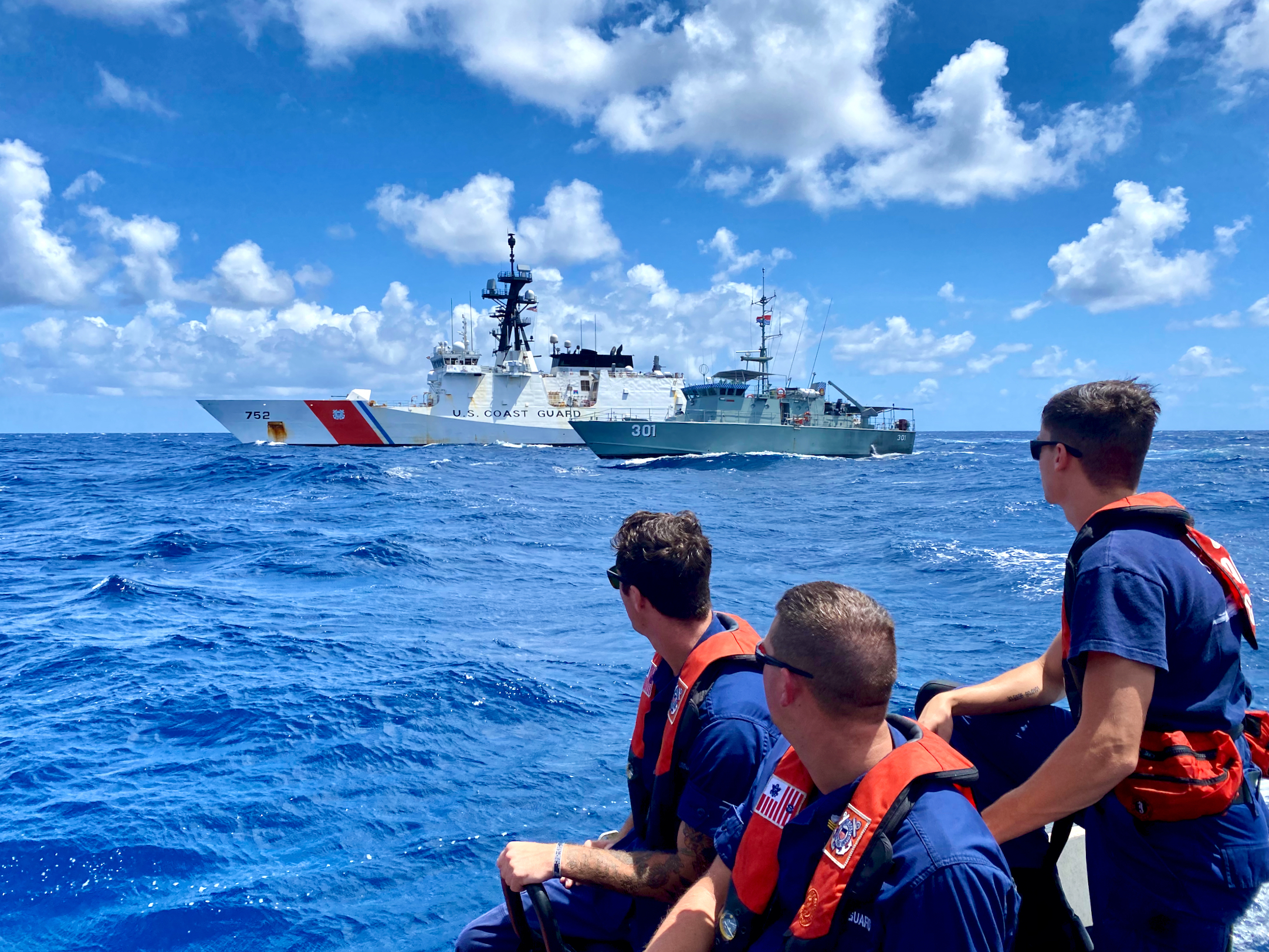
USCGC Stratton and the RKS Teanoai) at sea near Kiribati 2019

During Exercise Talisman Saber Stratton was a part of an amphibious readiness group that conducted an exercise to move Marines and associated equipment ashore in a simulated hostile environment, the cutter would act as a forward screen vessel and also provided fire support for the Marines during the landing. During the patrol, the cutters crew would conduct surface warfare training, including drills to defend against a missile attack on the cutter. Stratton returned to Alameda California on November 22, 2019, after a 162-day patrol, where the cutter visited ports in Fiji, Australia, Indonesia, Malaysia and the Philippines.

== See also ==
- Integrated Deepwater System Program
