= Florence Finch =

Filipino-American member of the World War II resistance (1915–2016)

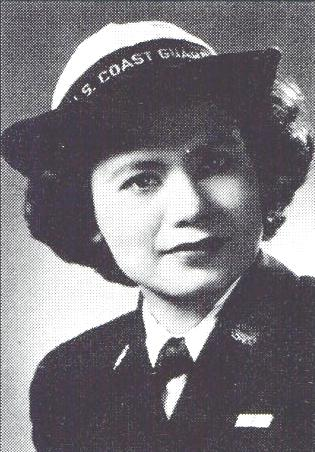
- Finch in 1945 or 1946
- Born: October 11, 1915; Santiago, Isabela, Philippine Islands
- Died: December 8, 2016 (aged 101); Ithaca, New York, U.S.
- Burial place: Pleasant Grove Cemetery, Cayuga Heights, New York
- Military career
- Allegiance: Commonwealth of the Philippines, United States of America
- Branch: Philippine resistance, United States Coast Guard
- Service years: 1942–1945 (Philippine resistance); 1945–1946 (USCG)
- Rank: Seaman second class (USCG)
- Unit: SPARS (USCG)
- Conflicts: World War II: Japanese occupation of the Philippines (POW)
- Awards: Medal of Freedom; Asiatic–Pacific Campaign Medal; World War II Victory Medal; Purple Heart; Prisoner of War Medal - Approved US Army 2 May 2024

Florence Ebersole Smith Finch (October 11, 1915 – December 8, 2016) was a Filipino-American member of the World War II resistance against the Japanese occupation of the Philippines.

== Life ==
Finch was born Loring May Ebersole on October 11, 1915, in Santiago, Isabela, the Philippine Islands, when the country was under American colonial rule. Her father was American and her mother was Filipina. How Ebersole's given name, usually masculine and thus unusual for women at that time, was changed to Florence remained unknown.

Prior to the Japanese invasion of the Philippines, Finch was working at the G-2 (Intelligence) Headquarters of the U. S. Army in Manila. There she met her husband, an American sailor named Charles Smith, who would be killed in action in the Philippines in 1942.

At the start of the occupation, she managed to suppress her American heritage and to secure a job at the Philippine Liquid Fuel Distributing Union, which was controlled by the occupying Japanese forces. There, between June 1942 and October 1944, she assisted the resistance movement by diverting fuel destined for Japanese use, falsifying documents for resistance members to obtain supplies, and using her position to facilitate acts of sabotage.

In 1944, she was discovered as having worked in the resistance and was arrested, tortured, tried and sentenced to three years of imprisonment. She remained in captivity until February 10, 1945, when, weighing just 80 pounds, she was freed by the American troops liberating the Philippines.

Following the war, she moved to Buffalo, New York, where she joined the U.S. Coast Guard.

She died on December 8, 2016, in Ithaca, New York. Finch was given a military funeral with full honors in April 2017.

== Awards and legacy ==
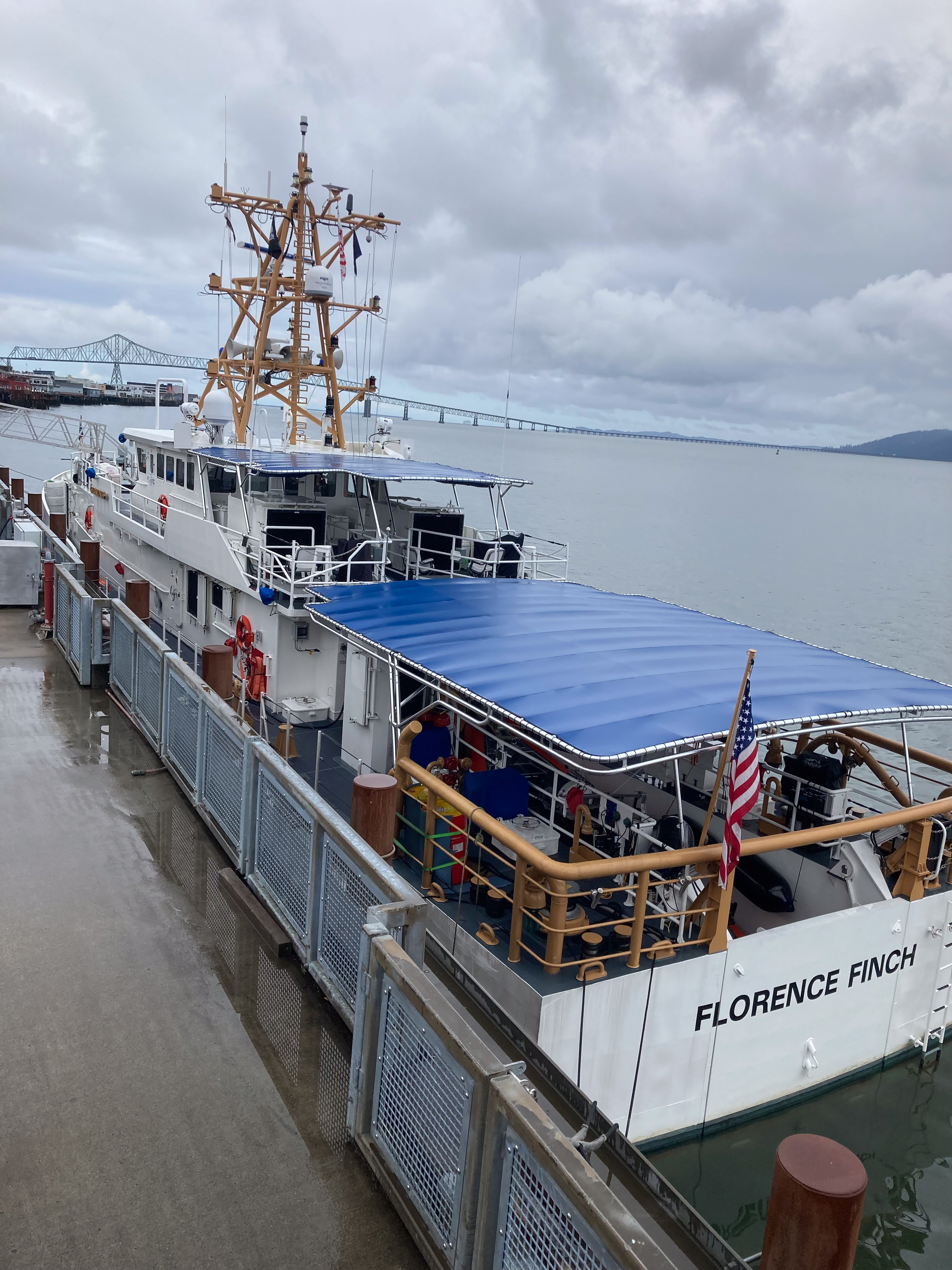
USCGC Florence Finch in Astoria, Oregon in 2024

Finch was awarded the American Medal of Freedom in 1947. She was also awarded the Asiatic–Pacific Campaign Ribbon, the first woman to be so decorated.

In 1995, the Coast Guard named a building on Sand Island in Hawaii in her honor.

In 2019, the USCG announced its intention to name their Fast Response Cutter (WPC 1157) for "Seaman First Class Florence Finch". The USCGC Florence Finch, commanded by Lieutenant Connor Ives, operates in the Puget Sound, the Strait of Juan de Fuca, and the Columbia River.
