= USCGC Alder (WLB-216) =

US Coast Guard Juniper-class seagoing buoy tender

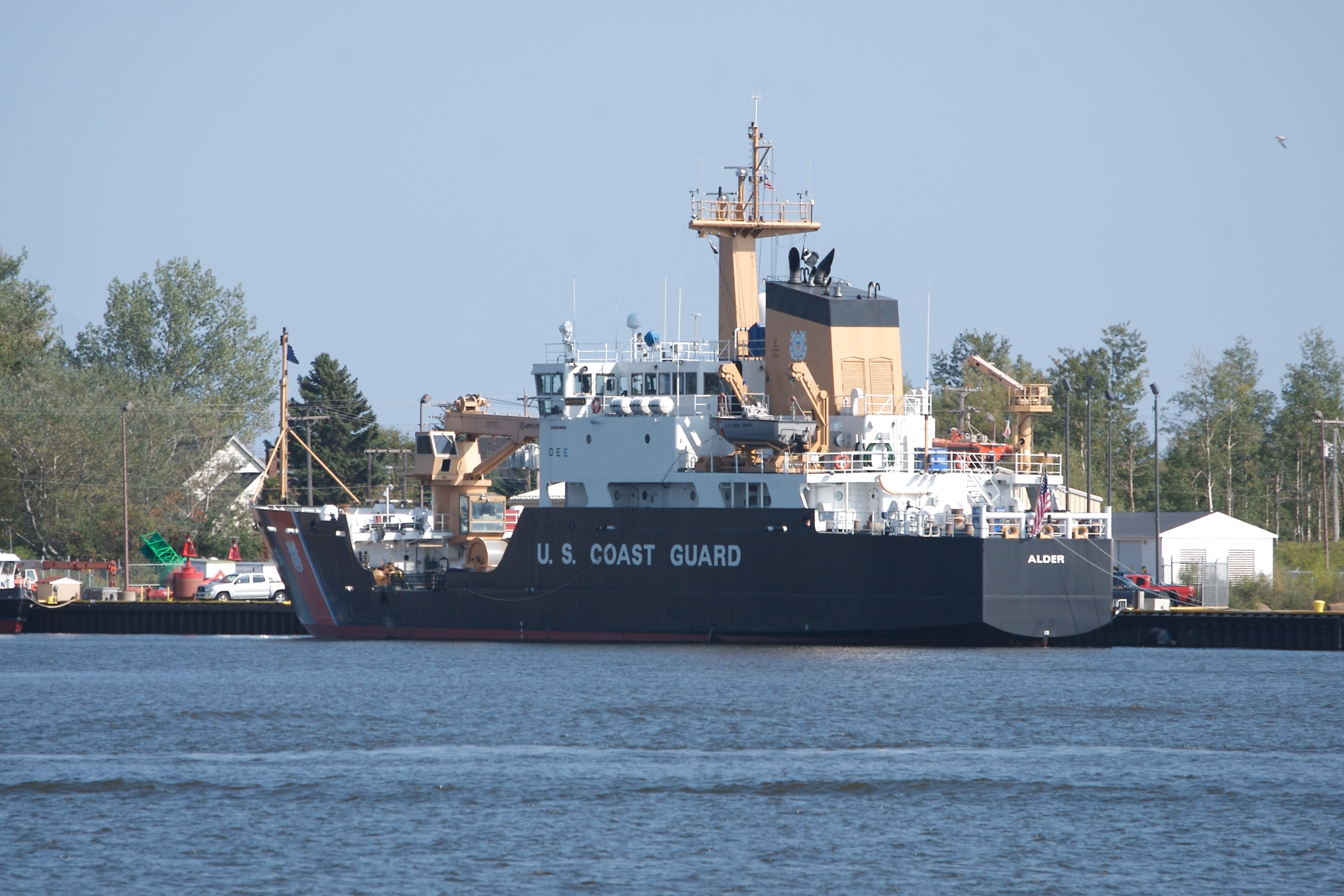
- Alder at a dock in Duluth, Minnesota

History

United States
- Builder: Marinette Marine Corporation, Marinette, Wisconsin
- Launched: 7 February 2004
- Commissioned: 10 June 2005
- In service: 2005–present
- Home port: San Francisco, California
- Identification: IMO number: 9271145; MMSI number: 369953000; Callsign: NGML
- Motto: Ruler of the Seas
- Status: Active
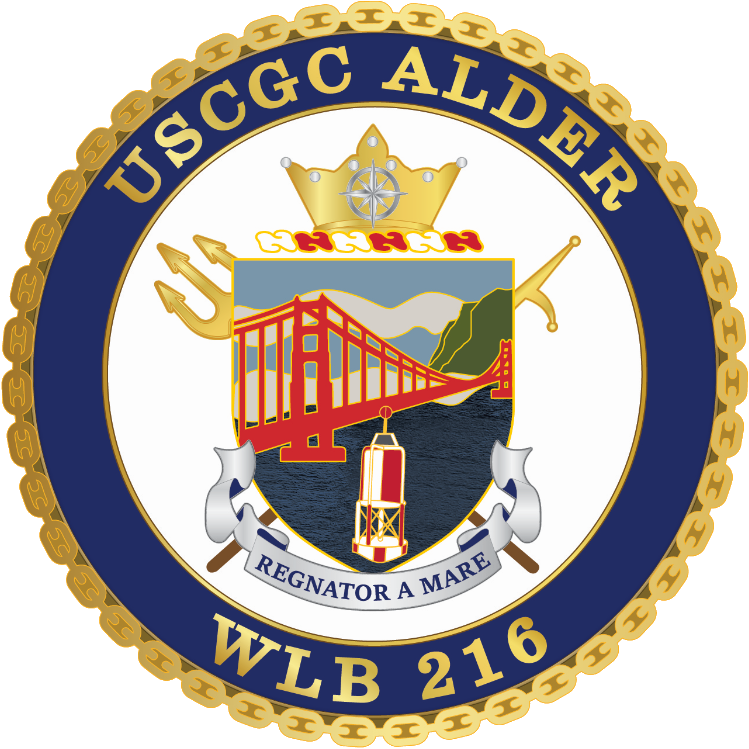
- Badge

General characteristics
- Class & type: Juniper-class
- Displacement: 2,000 long tons (2,000 t) at design draft (full load)
- Length: 225 ft (69 m)
- Beam: 46 ft (14 m)
- Draft: 13 ft (4.0 m)
- Propulsion: 2 × 3,100 shp (2,300 kW) Caterpillar 3608 diesel engines
- Speed: 15 kn (28 km/h; 17 mph) at full load displacement (80% rated power)
- Range: 6,000 nmi (11,000 km; 6,900 mi) at 12 kn (22 km/h; 14 mph)
- Complement: 50 (8 officers, 42 enlisted)

USCGC Alder (WLB-216) is the final Juniper-class, 225-foot (69 m) seagoing buoy tender of the United States Coast Guard.

Alder was built by Marinette Marine Corporation and launched on February 7, 2004. Alder's maiden voyage was on September 12, 2004. From commissioning until August 2022, Alder was assigned to Duluth, Minnesota as its home port. Alder replaced the previous cutter stationed in Duluth, USCGC Sundew, which retired after 60 years of service.

In the summer of 2021, Alder was temporarily relocated to Baltimore, Maryland for a yearlong maintenance period. In August 2022, she was reassigned to the San Francisco Bay area. Her duties in the Twin Ports of Duluth/Superior were taken over by her sister tender USCGC Spar (WLB-206).

Alder is designed as a multi-mission vessel, with its missions being Aids to Navigation, Icebreaking, Search and Rescue, Homeland Security, Law Enforcement, and Marine Environmental Protection.

== History ==
=== 2010s ===
==== Operation Nanook 2010 ====
In August 2010 the guided missile destroyer USS Porter and USCGC Alder participated in Operation Nanook 2010 in Baffin Bay and the Davis Straits. This was the fourth annual Operation Nanook organized by the Canadian Government, but it was the first to host foreign vessels.
