= Dorothy C. Stratton =

American first director of SPARS (1899–2006)

Dorothy Constance Stratton
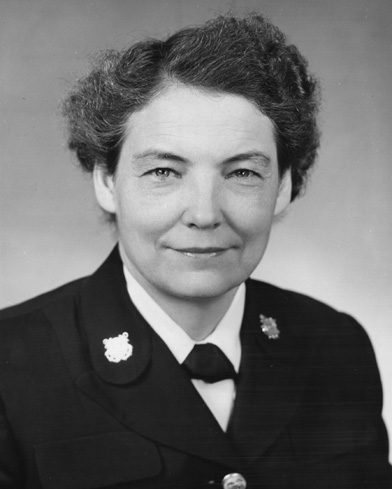
- Capt. Dorothy Stratton during World War II
- Born: March 24, 1899; Brookfield, Missouri, U.S.
- Died: September 17, 2006 (aged 107); West Lafayette, Indiana, U.S.
- Military career
- Allegiance: United States
- Branch: United States Coast Guard
- Service years: 1942–1946
- Rank: Captain
- Commands: SPARS
- Conflicts: World War II
- Awards: Legion of Merit (1946)
- Other work: Director of Personnel (1947–1950), International Monetary Fund; Executive Director (1950–1960), Girl Scouts of the USA

Dorothy Constance Stratton (March 24, 1899 – September 17, 2006) is best known as the first director of the SPARS, the U.S. Coast Guard Women's Reserve.

In 1942, she became the first woman to be commissioned an officer in U.S. Coast Guard and is credited with giving its Women's Reserve program the name of SPARS, an acronym created from the Coast Guard motto, Semper Paratus, and its English translation, Always Ready. Lieutenant Commander Stratton attained the rank of captain in February 1944 and served as director of the SPARS from 1942 until January 1946. She was also a trailblazer for women in other areas. She became Purdue University's first full-time Dean of Women (1933–1942) and the first director of personnel at the International Monetary Fund (1947–1950). Stratton also served as the national executive director of the Girl Scouts of the USA (1950–1960).

Stratton was the recipient of awards for her public service and leadership that included a Legion of Merit for her contributions to women in the military, the Ottawa University Alumni Association's Outstanding Achievement Award, and the University of Chicago's Alumni Association's Public Service Award. She was awarded honorary degrees from several American colleges and universities, such as Ottawa University, Smith College, and Purdue University, among others. Stratton is the namesake of the Coast Guard's third National Security Cutter, the USCGC Stratton (WMSL-752), the first National Security Cutter to be named after a woman.

== Early life and education ==
Dorothy Constance Stratton, the daughter of Reverend Richard L. Stratton and Anna (Troxler) Stratton, was born on March 24, 1899, in Brookfield, Missouri. Stratton's father was a Baptist minister. Her brother, Richard C. Stratton, served as a captain in the U.S. Army's Medical Reserve Corps during World War II.

Stratton's family traveled across the Midwest during her youth and she attended high schools in Lamar, Missouri, and Blue Rapids, Kansas. She earned a Bachelor of Arts degree from Ottawa University in 1920, a Master of Arts in psychology from the University of Chicago, and a doctorate (Ph.D.) in student personnel administration from Columbia University. She also studied at Northwestern University; the University of Washington; University of California, Los Angeles (UCLA); and University of California, Berkeley (UC-Berkeley). While pursuing her advanced degrees, Stratton taught at school in Brookfield, Missouri; Renton, Washington; and San Bernardino, California.

== Career ==
=== Purdue University, Dean of Women ===
In 1933, after receiving her Ph.D. from Columbia, Stratton joined the staff at Purdue University in West Lafayette, Indiana, and became as its first full-time Dean of Women. She was also an assistant professor of psychology at Purdue and became a full professor in 1940.

During her nine years at Purdue, the university's enrollment of women increased from 500 to more than 1,400. A large part of the increase was attributed to her efforts to develop an experimental curriculum that attracted women who preferred to study subjects other than home economics. Stratton created a liberal science curriculum for women in the university's School of Science, as well as a women's employment placement center. In addition, she helped establish a specialized training program that provided intensive training for fraternity and sorority housemothers across the country. Stratton also managed the construction of three new residence halls for women on Purdue's campus in West Lafayette.

=== Military service ===
In 1942 Stratton took a leave of absence from Purdue University and was commissioned as a lieutenant in the Women's Reserve of the U.S. Naval Reserve, which was also known as the WAVES (Women Accepted for Voluntary Emergency Service). She later credited Lillian Moller Gilbreth, professor of engineering at Purdue, for encouraging her to join the military, but she also recalled that she was willing "to do whatever I could to serve my country" and did not need much encouragement. Stratton was among the members of the first class of the U.S. Naval Training Station at Smith College in Northampton, Massachusetts. After completing her initial training, she briefly served as Assistant to the Commanding Officer of the radio school for WAVES at Madison, Wisconsin.

In November 1942, after Franklin D. Roosevelt signed an amendment to Public Law 773 to create a women's reserve for the U.S. Coast Guard, Stratton became the first woman to be accepted into the new program. She was immediately transferred from the U.S. Navy to the U.S. Coast Guard and was sent to the office of the Commandant of the Coast Guard in Washington, D.C. to organize the Coast Guard Women's Reserve. Stratton was appointed the first director of the Coast Guard Women's Reserve, promoted to the rank of lieutenant commander, and became the first woman commissioned an officer in the U.S. Coast Guard. She rose through the ranks and in February 1944 was promoted to the rank of captain.

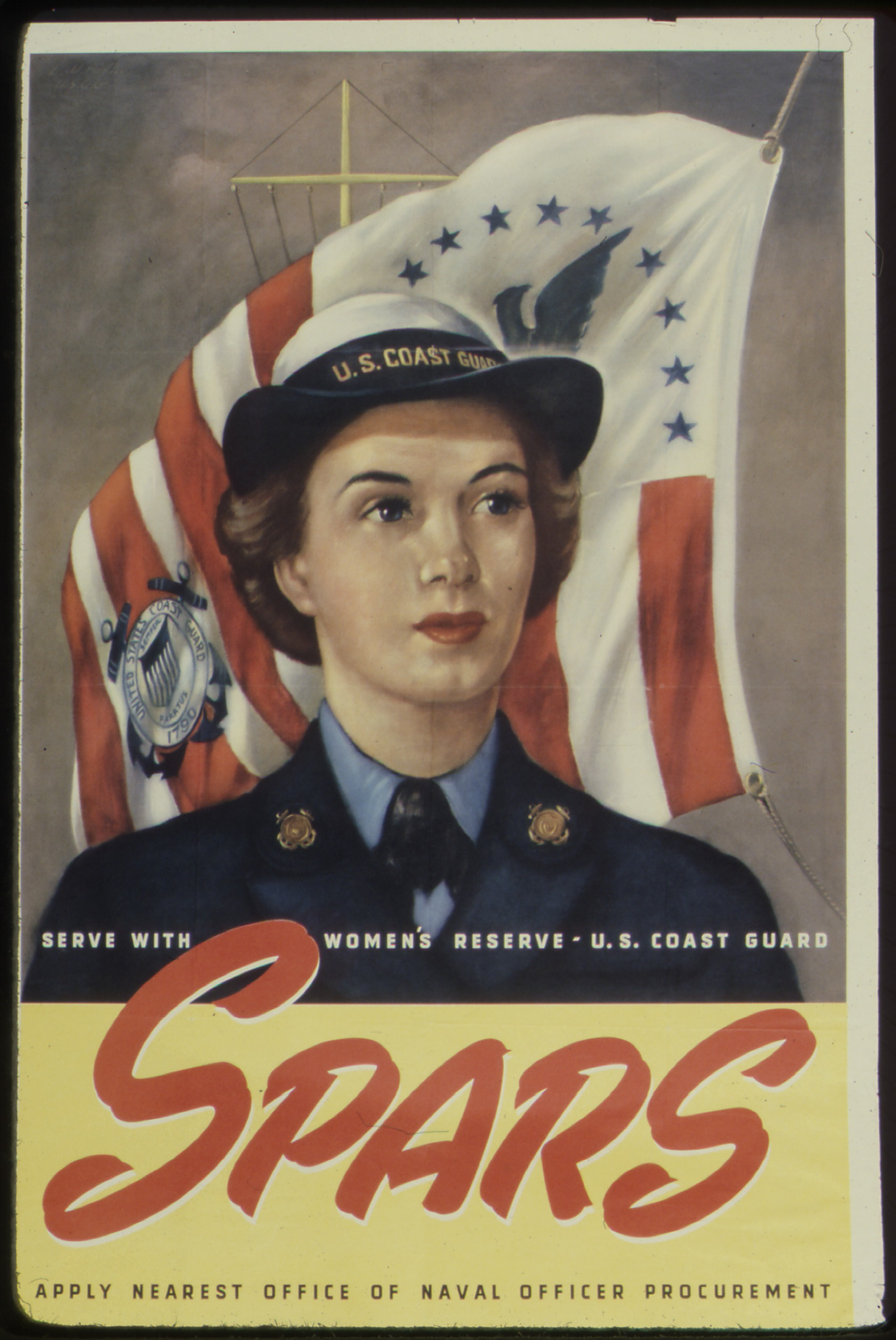
SPARS Recruitment Poster

Stratton developed the Coast Guard Women's Reserve program and gave it the name of SPARS, an acronym created from the Coast Guard motto, Semper Paratus, and its English translation, Always Ready. As director of the SPARS, a position that Stratton held until 1946, her primary role was to originate policies for SPARS that related to procurement, training, utilization, and maintenance of its members' morale. She oversaw significant growth in the program. More than 10,000 enlisted women and 1,000 commissioned officers served as SPARS in the remaining years of the war.

Stratton retired from the military in January 1946. Stratton remained proud of the fact the U.S. Coast Guard used the highest percentage of women of any military branch of service during the war.

=== Return to civilian life ===
Stratton remained active in the years following her military service. From 1947 to 1950, she worked for the International Monetary Fund as its first director of personnel. In 1950 she became national executive director of the Girl Scouts of the USA, a post she held until her retirement in 1960. She served as a United Nations representative of the International Federation of University Women and chaired the women's committee of the President's Commission on Employment of the Handicapped.

== Later years ==
In 1958 Stratton appeared as a guest challenger on the television show To Tell the Truth. She was the last survivor of the original women's reserve directors who served during World War II.

In 1985 Stratton relocated from Newtown, Connecticut, to West Lafayette, Indiana, to share a home with Helen B. Schleman, the former assistant director of the SPARS and a colleague of Stratton's at Purdue University.

== Death and legacy ==
Stratton died on September 17, 2006, in West Lafayette, Indiana, at the age of 107.

In 2004 U.S. Representative Steve Buyer of Indiana publicly commended Stratton for her leadership and patriotism. At the time of her death two years later, Purdue University president Martin C. Jischke noted that Stratton's roles as Dean of Women at Purdue, director of the SPARS during World War II, and her postwar career at the International Monetary Fund and as the national executive director for the Girl Scouts made her "a trailblazer in helping to create opportunities for women." As its first female officer Stratton was also a pioneer for women in the U.S. Coast Guard. The Dorothy C. Stratton papers are housed at the Purdue University Library, Archives and Special Collections.

== Honors and tributes ==
Stratton was awarded the Legion of Merit in 1946 for her contributions to women in the military. The certificate for the citation commended Stratton as a "brilliant organizer and administrator" who had "a keen understanding of the abilities of women and the tasks suited to their performance."

The U.S. Coast Guard's Women's Leadership Association named its "Captain Dorothy Stratton Leadership Award" in her honor. Created in 2001, the award is "presented to a female officer (W-2 to O-4)" of the Coast Guard who demonstrates "leadership and mentorship and who shares the Coast Guard's core values."

The Ottawa University Alumni Association awarded Stratton its Outstanding Achievement Award in 2005. She was also the recipient of the University of Chicago's Alumni Association's Public Service Award. Stratton was also awarded honorary degrees from Ottawa University, Russell Sage College, Smith College, Bates College, and Purdue University. Following her death in 2006, the Dorothy C. Stratton NROTC Scholarship Fund was established at the Purdue University Foundation.

In 2008 the Coast Guard named its third National Security Cutter the USCGC Stratton (WMSL-752) in her honor. It is the first National Security Cutter to be named after a woman.

In 2016 the National Women's History Project selected Stratton as one of its honorees for National Women's History Month for her public service and government leadership.

Stratton's work in organizing the SPARS during World War II was the subject of a short documentary film on Vimeo: "Dorothy Stratton and the Spars: The Legend Continues."

In 2023, Purdue University's Veteran and Military Success Center was renamed in honor of Stratton's service to the university. Stratton served as Purdue's Dean of Women from 1933 until 1942, when she was commissioned as a lieutenant in the U.S. Navy.

== Selected published works ==
- "Review of Introduction to Educational Psychology" in Psychological Bulletin 34#8 (Oct. 1937): 624–626. doi:10.1037/h0050021.
- Your Best Foot Forward: Social Usage for Young Moderns (1940), co-authored with Helen B. Schleman
- "Launching the SPARs" in Naval History 3 #2 (April 1989): 58+

== General and cited references ==
- "105th Birthday of Capt. Dorothy Stratton, USCRG" (PDF). Congressional Record. Washington, D.C.: E437 March 24, 2004.
- "Dorothy C. Stratton, Purdue's First Dean of Women, Dies at 107". Purdue University. Archived from the original on August 7, 2007.
- "Dorothy C. Stratton, USCGR (WR)". U.S. Coast Guard, U.S. Department of Homeland Security.
- "National Women's History Month 2016". National Women's History Project.
- "The Ottawa University Alumni Association Presents the 2005 Outstanding Achievement Award To Dorothy C. Stratton, Class of 1920" (PDF). United States Coast Guard, U.S. Department of Homeland Security.
- Shanahan, Susan (March 1999). "Living Legend" (PDF). The Coast Guard Reservist. XLVI (3). Washington, D.C.: U.S. Coast Guard: 12–15.
- "Women in Purdue History: Dorothy Stratton". Purdue University Libraries, Archives and Special Collections, Susan Bulkeley Butler Women's Archives. Archived from the original on October 20, 2017.
