= USCGC Sundew =

U.S. Coast Guard cutter

Coordinates: 46°46′34.8″N 92°6′16″W

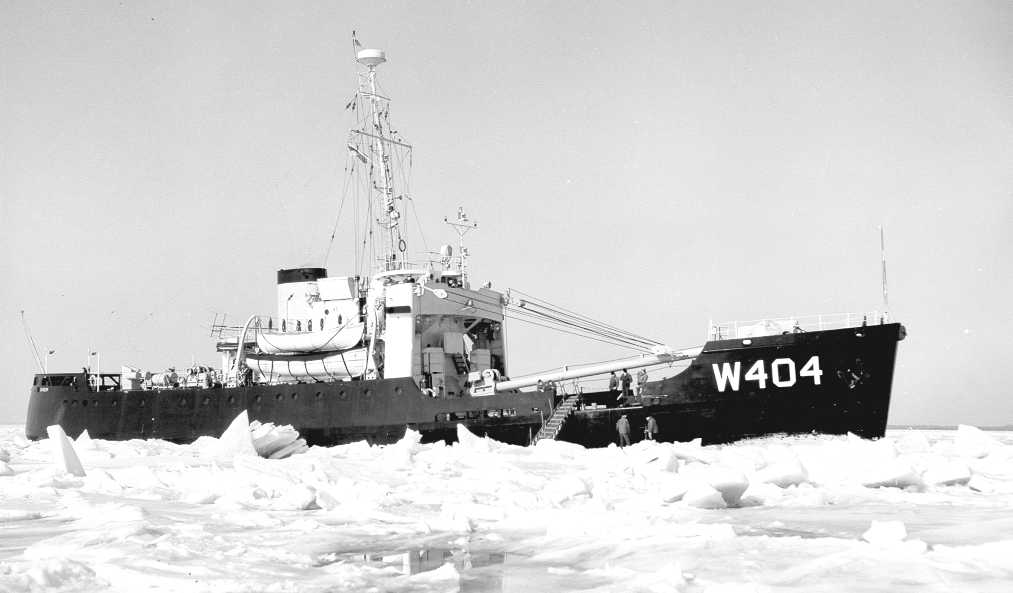
- USCGC Sundew.

History

U.S.
- Builder: Marine Ironworks & Shipbuilding Corporation, Duluth, Minnesota
- Cost: $861,589
- Laid down: 29 November 1943
- Launched: 8 February 1944
- Commissioned: 24 August 1944
- Decommissioned: 27 May 2004
- Identification: IMO number: 8635100
- Nickname(s): The Superior One
- Fate: Museum ship 2004-2009, sold to private interests 2010

General characteristics
- Class & type: Iris (C-Class)
- Displacement: 1,025 long tons (1,041 t)
- Length: 180 ft (55 m)
- Beam: 37 ft (11 m)
- Propulsion: 2 × Cooper BessemerGN8Turbochaged Diesel/Electric engines
- Speed: 13 kn (24 km/h; 15 mph)
- Range: 8,000 nmi (15,000 km; 9,200 mi) at 13 kn (24 km/h; 15 mph)
- Armament: Wartime: 20 mm guns, a 3-inch cannon and depth charges.; Peacetime: None

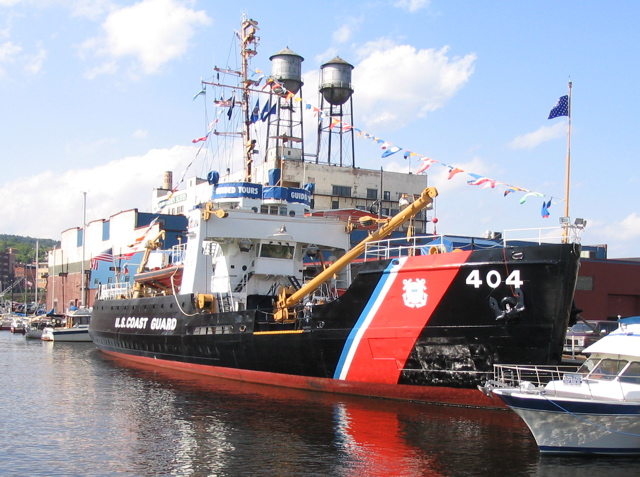
Sundew in Duluth

USCGC Sundew (WLB-404) was a 180-foot (55 m) sea going buoy tender (WLB). An Iris, or C-class tender, she was built by Marine Iron and Shipbuilding Corporation in Duluth, Minnesota, United States. Sundew's preliminary design was completed by the United States Lighthouse Service and the final design was produced by Marine Iron and Shipbuilding Corporation in Duluth for the U.S. Coast Guard. On 29 November 1943 the keel was laid. She was launched on 8 February 1944 and commissioned on 24 August 1944. The original cost for the hull and machinery was $861,589.

Sundew is one of 39 original 180-foot (55 m) seagoing buoy tenders built between 1942-1944. All but one of the original tenders, USCGC Ironwood, were built in Duluth. Like all of these tenders, Sundew was named after a plant, in this case the sundew, a carnivorous plant from the genus Drosera.

In 1958, Sundew was assigned to Charlevoix, Michigan, and the following November helped in the rescue of two survivors from the Carl D. Bradley when she sank in a storm on Lake Michigan 47 miles (76 km) west-northwest of Charlevoix. Sundew remained at Charlevoix until 1981, when she was replaced by USCGC Mesquite. Sundew was then moved to Duluth, Minnesota, where she served until she was retired in 2004.

Sundew served 60 years for the Coast Guard and was decommissioned and retired on 27 May 2004. As part of the decommissioning, the vessel was given to the city of Duluth, its last home port, to be used as a museum ship. The services provided by the Sundew were taken up by USCGC Alder.

Due to a drop in tourism revenue, in 2009 the city of Duluth sold Sundew to local residents, Jeff and Toni Foster, David Johnson and Mary Phillipp. The Sundew moved from her museum location in Duluth in the spring of 2010, and currently (2026) occupies a private slip near Duluth's Great Lakes Aquarium.
