= Helen B. Schleman =

American university dean

Helen Blanche Schleman
- Born: 1902; Francesville, Indiana
- Died: 1992 (aged 89–90); Indiana
- Education: Northwestern University; Wellesley College
- Occupation: Purdue's Dean of Women (1947 to 1968)

Helen Blanche Schleman (1902–1992), an Indiana native, was Purdue University's Dean of Women from 1947 to 1968 and a four-year military veteran of World War II.

== Biography ==
Helen Blanche Schleman was born in 1902 to William and Blanche Schleman in Francesville, Indiana. In 1920 she enrolled at Northwestern University finishing her A.B. in English literature and philosophy. She attended Wellesley College where she earned her first Master's degree and a certificate in hygiene and physical education (1928). At The Ohio State University, she worked from 1926–1932 in the Department of Physical Education for Women. In 1934, she moved to Purdue in Lafayette, Indiana, as the Director of Residence Halls for Women and there she met her lifelong friend Dorothy C. Stratton. Schleman earned her second master's degree at Purdue in psychology and education.

During World War II, she took a military leave of absence from Purdue to serve for four years in the U.S. Coast Guard Women's Reserve and attained the rank of Captain while working for the U.S. Navy. After her return to Purdue after the War, Schleman succeeded Acting Dean Clair Coolidge and former Dean Dorothy C. Stratton as Purdue's Dean of Women in 1947.

As Dean, she made some important changes at the university. She was instrumental in terminating the curfew for women students, she started a special conference program for first year women, and she fought for equity in the university's hiring and salary practices.

Schleman retired from Purdue in 1968; her successor as Dean of Women was M. Beverly Stone who later became Dean of Students. During her years at Purdue, Schleman was an advocate for women's rights and later became a founder and the first director of the Span Plan, a program that encouraged adults, nontraditional women students, to help them pursue career advancement after their children entered school. Purdue University's Schleman Hall was named in her honor. With Dorothy C. Stratton, she wrote Your Best Foot Forward: Social Usage for Young Moderns (1955).

Numerous collections of Schleman's papers are maintained in Purdue's archives.

Helen Blanche Schemen retired as a Dean Emeritus and died in 1992.
