= Beverley Stone =

American Dean of students (1916–2003)

Marguerite Beverley Stone
- Born: June 10, 1916; Norfolk, Virginia
- Died: April 16, 2003 (aged 86)
- Burial place: Norfolk, Virginia
- Other name: M. Beverley Stone
- Education: Randolph-Macon Woman's College; Columbia University; Purdue University
- Occupation: Dean of students

Marguerite Beverley Stone (June 10, 1916 – April 16, 2003) became Purdue University's first dean of students in 1974, and the first woman to hold a position of this kind at a Big Ten university. Stone began her 24-year career at Purdue in 1956 as an assistant dean of women. In 1968 she succeeded Helen B. Schleman as Purdue's dean of women. During the 1960s Stone supported a new requirement appointed students to Purdue's faculty committees. When the Dean of Women and Dean of Men offices were combined in 1974, Stone succeeded acting dean Bryan Clemins to become dean of students. In addition to her administrative role at Purdue, Stone co-authored Counseling Women with her colleague, Barbara I. Cook. Stone was active in numerous professional and community organizations and a recipient of many honors and awards. She retired from Purdue in 1980; her successor as dean of students was Barbara I. Cook, one of her assistants. A sculpture honoring Stone and Cook was erected on Purdue's West Lafayette, Indiana, campus.

== Early life and education ==
Stone was born on June 10, 1916, in Norfolk, Virginia.

In 1932, she began classes at Randolph-Macon Woman's College in Lynchburg, Virginia. She graduated in 1936. After starting a teaching position at a Norfolk high school, she took summer classes at Teachers College of Columbia University to earn a master's degree in student personnel administration, graduating in 1940. She then took a position at Tusculum College in Greeneville, Tennessee, where she served as an assistant professor of history.

During World War II, Stone applied and was accepted into the United States Naval Women's Reserve, known as WAVES or Women Accepted for Volunteer Emergency Service. In September 1943, she began training at Midshipman Training School at Smith College. She was commissioned in November, 1943.

Stone earned a student dean professional diploma from Teachers College of Columbia University in 1956.

== Career ==
Stone accepted a position at Purdue University in 1956, as assistant dean of women. Purdue University's dean of women at the time was Helen Schleman.

Stone retired as dean of students from Purdue University in 1980.

== Death ==
Stone died on April 16, 2003. She was 86 years old. She was buried with her family in her birthplace of Norfolk, Virginia.

== Honors and tributes ==
In 1980, Stone received the first Distinguished Purdue Woman Award, a Distinguished Old Master citation, and the M. Beverley Stone Award was established in her honor.

In 1984, the Purdue Panhellenic Association officially unveiled a memorial to Stone. The association spent the previous five years raising money through plant sales. A plaque on the memorial marker reads, "In honor of M. Beverley Stone, Dean of Student Emerita, for her 24 years of loving concern for students and for her exemplary leadership to Panhellenic, the sororities, and the University--Donated by the Purdue Panhellenic Association, October 1984." The memorial marker is located in Purdue University's Purdue Memorial Union on the intersection of Grant and State Streets. Her memorial marker is one of three markers honoring past Purdue University deans of students; the other two women honored are Barbara Ivy Wood Cook and Betty M. Nelson, and their markers were installed years later.

== Selected published works ==
- Counseling Women (Guidance Monograph Series. No. 7: Special topics in Counseling) (1973), co-authored with Barbara I. Cook
- "Retirement Adjustments"
