= SPARS =

Women's branch of the U.S. Coast Guard Reserve during WWII

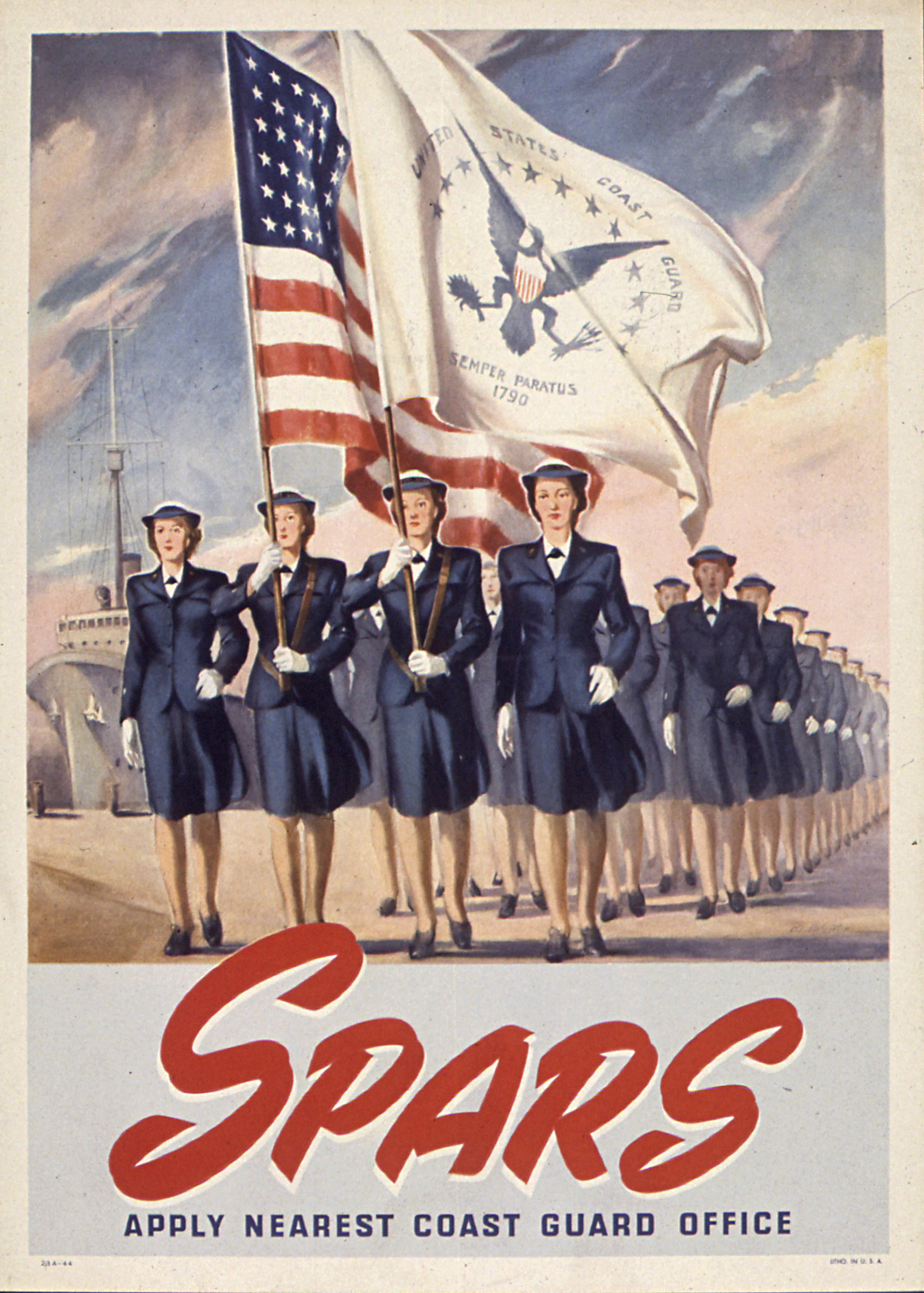
SPAR recruitment poster used during World War II

SPARS was the acronym for the women's branch of the United States Coast Guard (USCG) Women's Reserve. The abbreviation was derived from the Coast Guard motto, Latin: "Semper Paratus"—"Always Ready" (SPAR). (Note: Explanatory note on usage: The acronym describing the U.S. Coast Guard Women's Reserve Branch often differs across publications. For consistency, this article will use SPARS to refer to the branch itself, Spar for an individual member, and Spars for multiple members.) The branch was established by the U.S. Congress and signed into law by President Franklin D. Roosevelt in November 1942 during World War II. This legislation authorized the USCG to accept officer candidates and enlisted personnel into its ranks for the duration of World War II plus six months. Its purpose was to release male personnel for sea duty by filling essential shore-based roles with women; while initially restricted to the continental United States, members were later allowed to serve in some U.S. territories.

Dorothy C. Stratton was appointed director of the program with the rank of lieutenant commander. The recruitment standards for age and education varied depending on whether applicants were seeking to be officer candidates or enlisted personnel. African American women were not accepted for service until late 1944. The training for both groups varied in focus and took place at several sites across the U.S., including the United States Coast Guard Academy and Palm Beach, Florida, Training Canter. While most personnel performed in administrative and clerical roles, others filled technical positions; notably, in 1943, the Coast Guard assigned Spars to the top-secret LORAN (Long Range Aid to Navigation) program. By the end of the war, approximately 11,000 women had served in the branch. They were stationed in every Coast Guard district except Puerto Rico, including the Territories of Alaska and Hawaii.

The demobilization of the program began shortly after the surrender of Japan in August 1945, and nearly all members were discharged by mid-1946. The Women's Reserve was officially inactivated in 1947, but was reactivated as the U.S. Coast Guard Women's Volunteer Reserve in November 1949. During the Korean War, the Coast Guard actively recruited former Spars, with approximately 200 women reenlisting for service. On December 5, 1973, Congress passed Public Law 93-174, which ended the separate Women's Volunteer Reserve and officially permitted women to serve in the regular Coast Guard and the Coast Guard Reserve on an integrated basis. The legacy of the program has been honored by the naming of several vessels, including the USCGC Spar (WLB-403), the USCGC Spar (WLB-206), and the USCGC Stratton (WMSL-752).

== Background ==
Prior to World War II, the United States Coast Guard functioned as a branch of the United States Department of the Treasury. On November 1, 1941, as international tensions escalated, President Franklin D. Roosevelt issued Executive Order 8929, which transferred the service to the jurisdiction of the United States Department of the Navy. This transition fundamentally altered the Coast Guard's mission from civilian maritime oversight and law enforcement to active military and combat support. The expansion of the service created an immediate need for additional personnel. As historian Emily Yellin notes in Our Mothers' War, the establishment of a women's reserve was a primary method by which the Coast Guard could manage this rapid growth. By mid-1942, the Coast Guard leadership recognized that to maintain its operational tempo, it would need to follow the precedents established by the Army's WACS and the Navy's WAVES.

Legislation was subsequently sponsored in Congress to grant women Coast Guard status and benefits. It passed as Public Law 773 (77th Congress) and was signed by President Franklin D. Roosevelt on November 23, 1942. This Act authorized the Coast Guard to accept officer candidates and enlisted personnel into its ranks for the duration of World War II plus six months, with the primary purpose of releasing male personnel for sea duty by filling essential shore-based roles. Although service was initially restricted to the continental United States, later legislative amendments allowed members to serve in the U.S. Territories of Hawaii and Alaska.

== Leadership ==
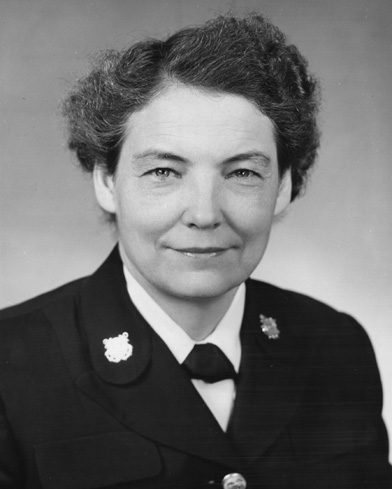
Captain Dorothy C. Stratton, Diredtor of the SPARS (1942 to 1946)

Before her military service, Dorothy C. Stratton established a career in higher education and psychology. After earning a Master of Arts from the University of Chicago and a PhD from Columbia University, she was appointed in 1933 as an assistant professor of psychology and the first full-time Dean of Women at Purdue University. During her nine-year tenure at Purdue, Stratton was responsible for the academic and professional development of the female student body. This extensive administrative experience with large-scale women's programs prepared her as a qualified choice for the leadership of the SPARS.

In 1942, Stratton requested and was granted an extended leave of absence from Purdue University to join the Navy's newly established WAVES (Women Accepted for Volunteer Emergency Service). On August 28, 1942, she reported to the Naval Reserve Midshipmen's School at Smith College in Northampton, Massachusetts, joining the first class of 119 female officer candidates for the WAVES. The class consisted of scientists, teachers, administrators, and business professionals. Upon graduation, she was commissioned as a Lieutenant-Senior Grade. Stratton was then assigned to radio operators’ school at the University of Wisconsin in Madison, which was her first and only assignment for the WAVES.

Shortly afterward, the U.S. Congress established the United States Coast Guard branch of the Women's Reserve under Public Law 773 (Chapter 639), which was signed into law by President Franklin D. Roosevelt on November 22, 1942. The following day, Dorothy C. Stratton–a lieutenant in the WAVES–was appointed the director of the new program and sworn into the Coast Guard as a lieutenant commander by Admiral Russell R. Waesche, the Commandant.

Following her appointment, Stratton faced the immediate challenge of organizing a branch that lacked administrative infrastructure, recruitment pipelines, and personnel. To help resolve this, the Coast Guard relied on the cooperation of the Navy. To assist Stratton in establishing the new service, 15 officers and 153 enlisted WAVES transferred from the Navy's women's reserve to the Coast Guard's women's reserve—becoming the first Spars.

Under Stratton's leadership, the Coast Guard Women’s Reserve experienced rapid growth, expanding from its initial group of transferred WAVES to approximately 11,000 enlisted members and commissioned officers. Beyond establishing policy and recruitment guidelines, Stratton is credited with naming the service. Drawing on the traditional Coast Guard motto "Semper Paratus"("Always Ready"), she derivied the acronym "SPAR" by combining the first letters of the Latin motto with those of its English translation. She attained the rank of captain and served as director from 1942 until 1946. Stratton was awarded the Legion of Merit for her wartime leadership.

== Recruitment ==
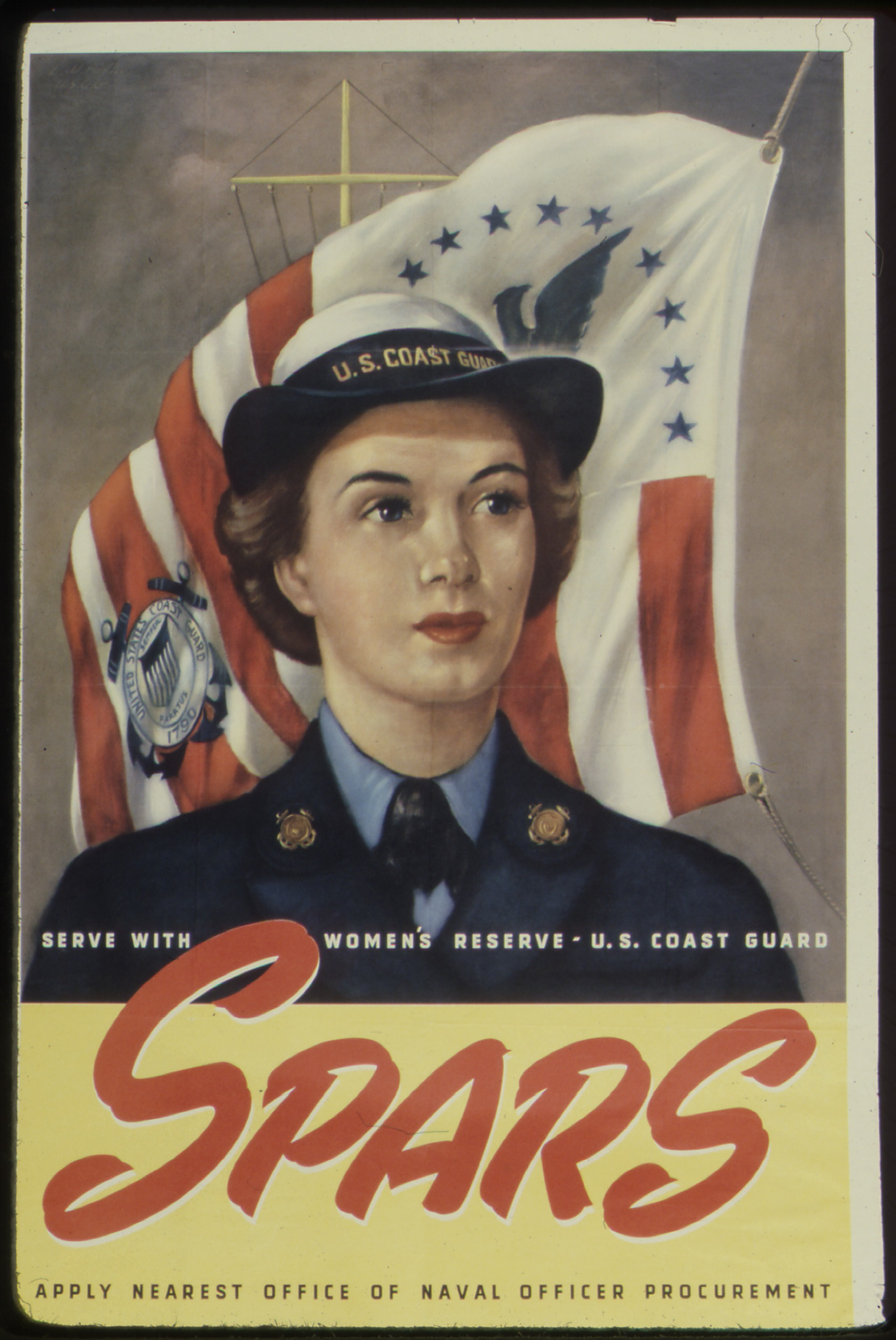
SPAR recruitment poster used during World War II

=== Requirements and prohibitions ===
In order to apply for the Women's Reserve, officer candidates and enlisted applicants had to be American citizens who had no children under 18 years of age. Applicants had to present three character references, pass a physical examination, and submit a record of their occupation after leaving school. Officer candidates needed to be age 20–50, and college graduates or to have completed two years of college with at least two years of acceptable business or professional experience. Enlisted applicants had to be age 20–36, and they were required to have completed at least two years of high school. Unmarried women had to agree not to marry until they had completed training. After training, SPARs could marry any man who was not in the USCG. Married women could apply for the Women's Reserve (as either officers or enlisted), provided their husbands were not already serving in the Coast Guard.

=== General recruitment efforts ===
Early on in the planning process, the U.S. Navy, the U.S. Marine Corps, and the USCG agreed to recruit and train their respective women's reserves together at existing Navy facilities. For recruitment of personnel, the SPARs would utilize the Office of Naval Officer Procurement. Their recruiting efforts began in December 1942, but they were hampered at first by the initial lack of SPAR personnel. After the Navy agreed to allow transfer requests for its WAVES reservists, a total of 15 officers and 153 enlisted women discharged from the Navy reserves, and they became the first SPARs. Eventually, SPAR officers were assigned to most Naval Officer Procurement sites to facilitate USCG recruitment of personnel. SPAR recruitment information was customarily disseminated along with WAVES publicity materials, but it became increasingly apparent that the job of selling the SPARs would include selling the USCG itself.

By June 1943, it was clear that combined SPARs–WAVES recruitment did not favor the Coast Guard's own efforts, so it withdrew from the joint agreement effective July 1. After this point, all USCG applicants would be interviewed and enlisted only at USCG district recruiting stations. The change was met with enthusiasm by SPAR recruiters and yielded positive results overall. But despite this change, competition with the other, better-known women's reserves remained keen. In Three Years Behind the Mast, written by former Women's Reserve officers Lyne and Arthur, they describe some of the difficulties faced by SPAR recruiters:

During the day, we made speeches, distributed posters, decorated windows, led parades, manned information booths, interviewed applicants, appeared on radio programs, and gave aptitude tests. By night, we made more speeches, prayed women would be drafted, and went to bed dreaming about our quotas.

The primary recruitment phase ended on December 31, 1944. During the two-year effort, over 11,000 women signed enlistment contracts to join the Women's Reserve, though many more women were interviewed. Of those applicants who otherwise met the requirements, one-fourth were rejected for failure to pass the medical exam.

In her 1989 oral history article, "Launching the SPARS", Stratton revisited the recruiting practices during her tenure as director:

At first we were going for perfection in our recruiting effort. As we were falling behind in our numbers, modifications to physical requirements were made. It was ridiculous to make the same physical demands of women when they weren't going to be manning ships at sea. If we hadn't been so inflexible in our standards at the beginning—if we'd set more reasonable ones—I'm sure we'd have been better off.

Dorothy Tuttle had the distinction of being the first woman to enlist in the Coast Guard Women's Reserve on December 7, 1942. She later became a Yeoman Third Class (Y3C).

=== Minority recruitment ===
==== African American women ====
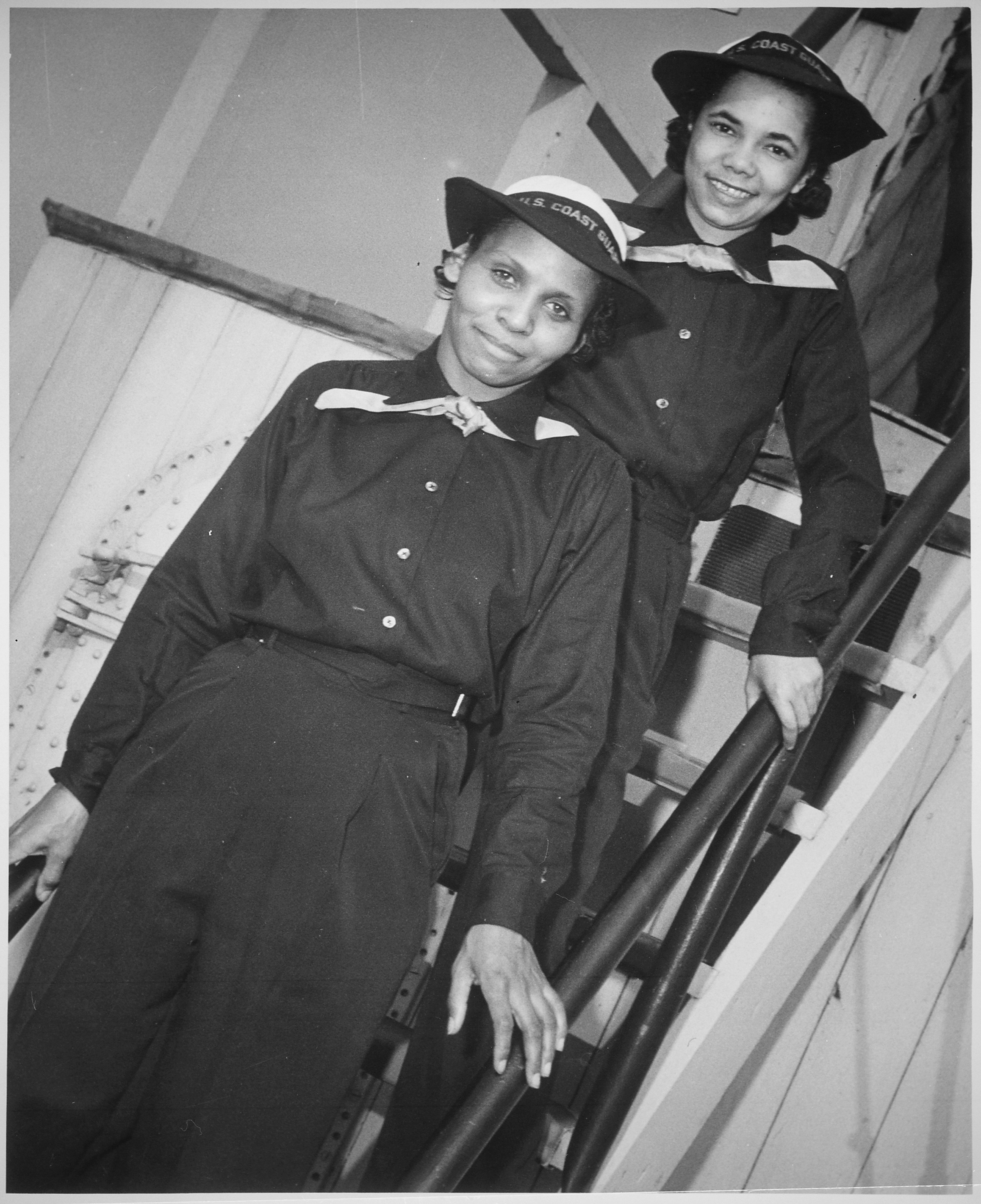
Olivia Hooker (front) with Aileen Anita Cooks (behind), at "boot" training, Manhattan Beach, Brooklyn

The SPARs, like the WAVES, would not open its enlistment door to African American women until October 1944; both reserve branches were under the supervision of the Secretary of the Navy, Frank Knox, who was vehemently opposed to the acceptance of African American women into the naval services. After Knox died in April 1944, he was replaced by James Forrestal. The new secretary proposed that African American women be accepted, but under some apparent discriminatory conditions. President Roosevelt decided to delay any decision on the matter until after the 1944 United States presidential election, which would be held on November 7. Meanwhile, Thomas E. Dewey, Republican candidate for president, during a speech in Chicago criticized the administration for discriminating against African American women. On October 19, 1944, Roosevelt instructed the Secretary of the Navy to accept African American women into naval services.

During the same month, the Secretary of the Navy ordered the WAVEs and SPARs to begin accepting black women recruits into their ranks. In February 1945, four months later, five African American women entered the SPARs: Olivia Hooker, Winifred Byrd, Julia Mosley, Yvonne Cumberbatch, and Aileen Cooke. They received their basic training at the Manhattan Beach, Brooklyn, New York Training Center. Hooker (a survivor of the 1921 Tulsa race massacre) was the first to enlist and became the first African American SPAR. After boot camp, the former elementary school teacher received training as a yeoman and then spent the remainder of her service time at a USCG separation center in Boston, Massachusetts. While there, Hooker served as a Yeoman Second Class (Y2C) and was awarded the Good Conduct Medal. Hooker was discharged from the Women's Reserve (SPARs) in June 1946.

In 2015, the U.S. Coast Guard honored 100-year-old Hooker (now a retired university professor) by naming two facilities after her: a dining hall at the Staten Island, New York, station and a training facility at its headquarters in Washington, D.C. Hooker died in 2018 at 103 years of age.

==== Hispanic and Latino American women ====
Christine Valdez—according to the USCG—enlisted on November 8, 1943, and she is identified as the first Hispanic female to have served in the SPARs. A Utah native, Valdez served at the Seattle SPAR Barracks as a Pharmacist Mate Third Class (PM3C). Several other Hispanic women enlisted during 1943, including: Hope Garcia—Yeoman Second Class (Y2C)— who served in New Orleans; Maria Nunez—Storekeeper (SK)—served in Cleveland, and Nora Lopez—Radioman Third Class (RM3C)—who served in Washington, D.C., and New York. The following year, Olga Perdomo—Storekeeper (SK)—and Maria Flores—Seaman First Class—also enlisted. Perdomo served in the supply office in New York and Flores used her bilingual skills at the District Office in Long Beach, California. Mary Elizabeth Rivero—Lieutenant (junior grade) (Lt. (j.g.)—joined the SPARs on December 4, 1943, and was the first Hispanic American female to become a commissioned officer in the USCG. Her duties included overseeing the identification office and the barracks in Long Beach, California.

==== Native American women ====
In April 1943, an active effort was made by the SPARs to recruit women from Oklahoma, nicknaming them the Sooner Squadron (since Oklahoma is known as "the Sooner State"). At least six of the women recruited there were from Oklahoma's Otoe–Missouria, Choctaw, Yuchi, and Cherokee tribal nations joined the SPARs. Seaman Mildred Cleghorn Womack (Otoe), Yeoman Corrine Koshiway Goslin (Otoe), Yeoman Lula Mae O'Bannon (Choctaw), Yeoman Lula Belle Everidge (Choctaw), Yeoman June Townsend (Yuchi–Choctaw), and Yeoman Nellie Locust (Cherokee) served as enlisted personnel.

== Training ==
=== Officer training ===
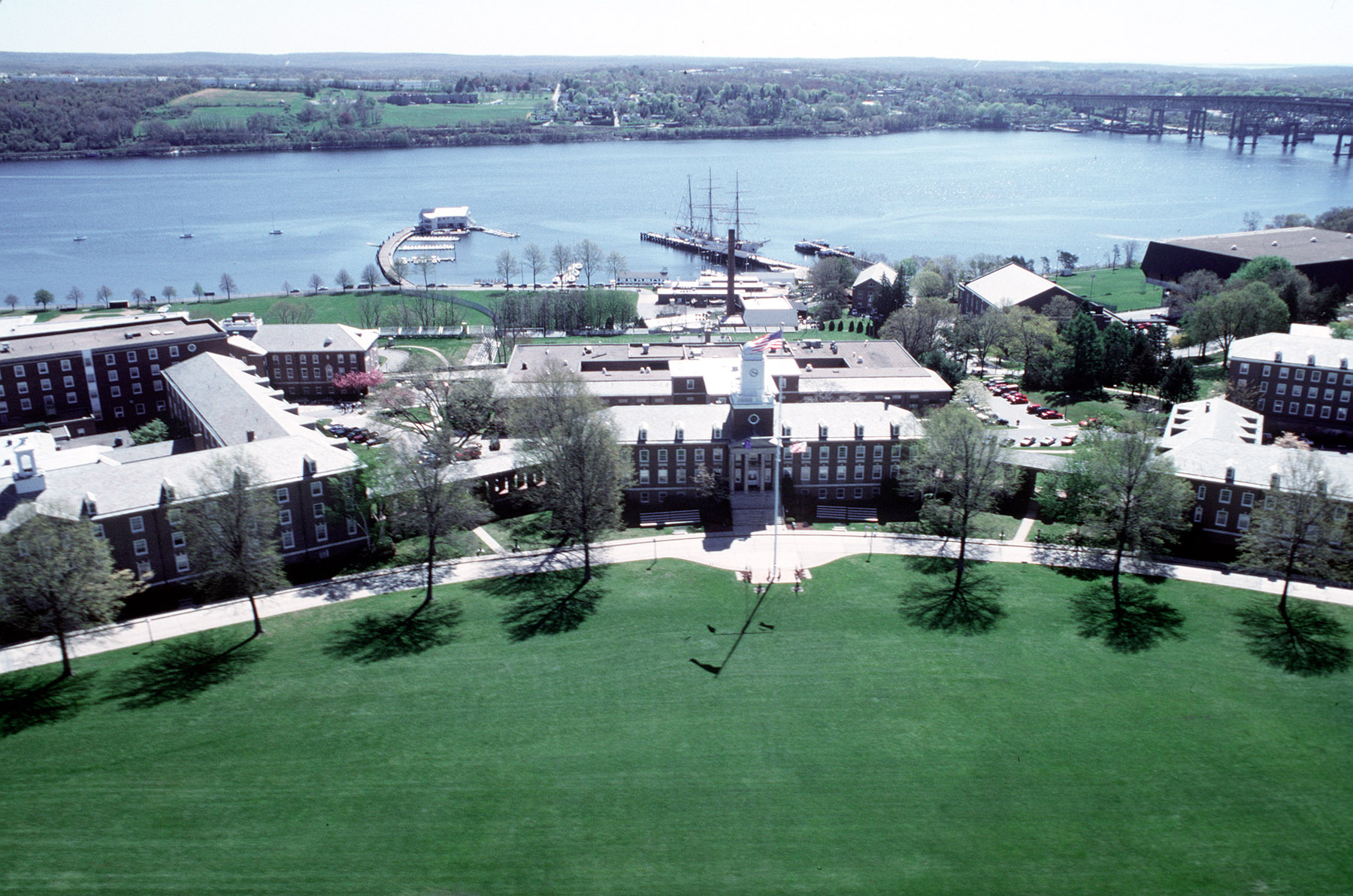
United States Coast Guard Academy, New London, Connecticut.

The initial agreement between the Navy and the Coast Guard required that SPAR officer candidates receive their indoctrination at Smith College in Northampton, Massachusetts—the official Naval Reserve Midshipmen's School. But in June 1943, the USCG withdrew from the agreement, and the indoctrination for their Women's Reserve candidates was transferred to the USCG Academy in New London, Connecticut. Approximately 203 SPARs were trained at the New London Midshipmen's School (for the Women's Reserve), and the U.S. Coast Guard became the only U.S. military service to train female officer candidates at its own academy.

The officer training period was initially six weeks, but later it was increased to eight weeks. The program was designed to provide candidates with an overall view of the Coast Guard, and to help them become good officers. Academically, the curriculum included such subjects as: administration, correspondence, communications, history, organization, ships, personnel, and public speaking. Military regimentation, another part of training, was designed to help candidates adjust to military life and their responsibilities as officers. Candidates included women who, in their civilian lives, had previously been employed as teachers, journalists, lawyers, and technicians. Approximately one-third of all officers received specialized training, either as communication officers or as pay and supply officers. To minimize the need (and time required) for extra instruction, the USCG intentionally recruited candidates whose previous civilian work experience would help eliminate the need for further training.

By the end of the program, a total of 955 women—ranging in age from 24 to 40—had been commissioned and trained. Of these, 299 came up from the enlisted ranks. In late 1944, after determining that the number of commissioned officers was sufficient, the Coast Guard discontinued the program. However, when the need arose to replace officers who had been sent overseas or separated from the service, the training program was later reopened. The final class of officer candidates was made up of former enlisted SPARs who had trained at Manhattan Beach, Brooklyn, New York.

=== Enlisted training ===
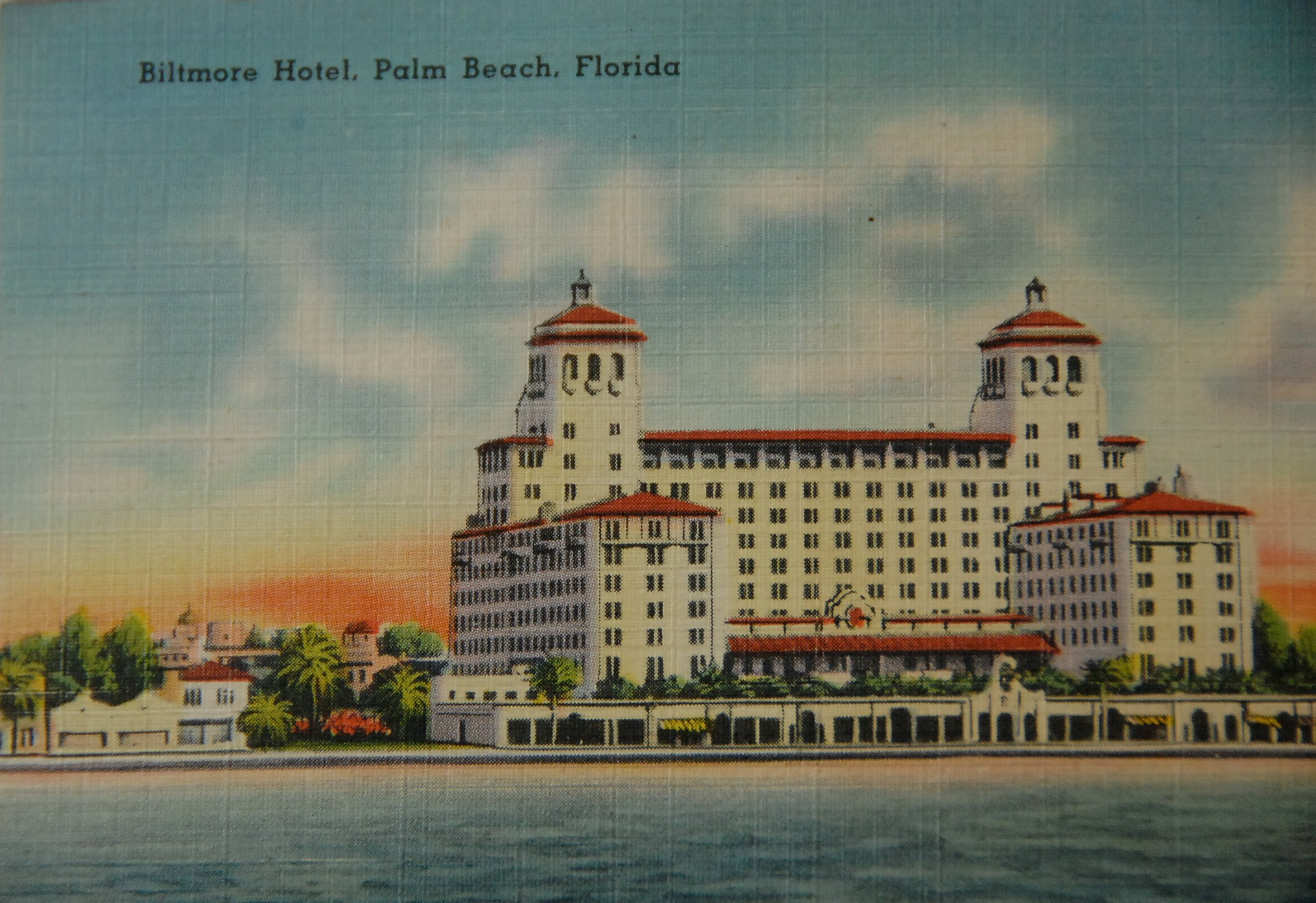
The Biltmore Hotel, Palm Beach, Florida, used as the USCG training center for enlisted SPARs during World War II

The agreement between the Navy and the Coast Guard also required that the USCG's enlisted recruits would receive their basic training at Naval Training Schools located around the country. About 1,900 SPARs received their recruit training at Hunter College in the Bronx, New York. A small number of SPARs received yeoman training at Oklahoma A&M University in Stillwater, Oklahoma. An additional 150 received yeoman training at Iowa State Teachers College in Cedar Falls, Iowa. But by March 1943, the USCG had decided to establish its own training center, both for basic and for specialized recruit training programs. They leased the Biltmore Hotel in Palm Beach, Florida, and the site was remodeled and then commissioned as a training station on May 23, 1943. Beginning in late June, all enlisted personnel began receiving both basic and specialized training at the new facility.

The training period for recruits at Palm Beach was six weeks. Boot camp was designed to bridge the gap from civilian to military life. The training covered instruction on subjects such as: USCG activities and organization, personnel, and current events. The physical component included drill exercises, games, swimming, and education in body mechanics.

Another important aspect of recruit training was the testing, classification, and selection process. This was designed to make the most of each recruit's abilities, background, and interests. Testing results provided a basis for general assignments and the opportunity for further specialized training. Approximately 70 percent of enlisted women (mostly yeoman and storekeepers) received some specialized training. Some recruits attended different Navy schools to be trained as: motion picture sound technicians, Link Trainer operators, air control operators, or parachute riggers. Others attended USCG schools to be trained as cooks, bakers, radiomen, pharmacist mates, radio technicians, and motor vehicle drivers. From the first class (June 14, 1943) to the final class (December 16, 1944), more than 7,000 recruits were trained at the Palm Beach station. In January 1945, the training of enlisted personnel was transferred from Palm Beach to Manhattan Beach, Brooklyn, New York, the largest USCG training station for men.

== Assignments ==
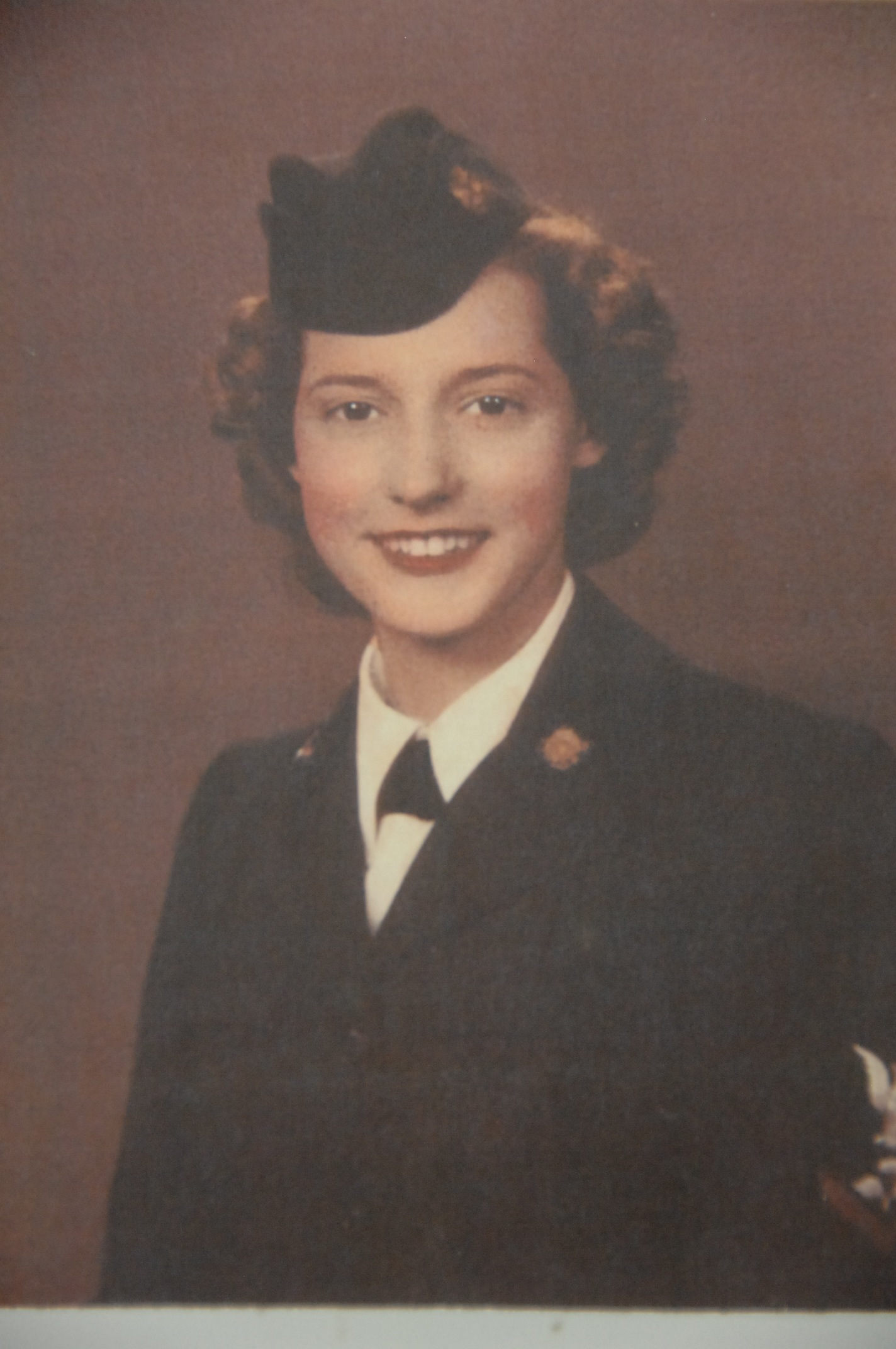
Enlisted SPAR Dolores Denfield, a parachute rigger during World War II

=== General ===
Except for the territory of Puerto Rico, the women of SPARs served in every USCG district, including in the then territories of Hawaii and Alaska. They worked not only in the district offices, but also in many of the small district field units. SPARs performed a wide variety of duties, and on the whole performed them well—so well that requests for their services by USCG commanding officers continued increasing with time. However, as the female reservists began replacing men in the workplace, the general attitude of the men toward women reportedly ranged from enthusiastic to open hostility. The authors of Three Years Behind the Mast explain the hostility aspect this way:

We felt that one important factor in determining a man's attitude was his own desire for sea duty. If he were eligible and wanted to shove off, he was not inclined to frown with disfavor upon his deliverer, even if she appeared in Spar [sic] clothing. On the other hand, it was natural that the swivel-chair commando should rail against the presence of the little lady who had come to release him for the briny deep. Fortunately the proportion of the latter was low compared with the Coast Guard as a whole.

Most of the officers served in administrative and supervisory roles in various divisions of the USCG. Others served as communication officers, supply officers, and barracks and recruiting officers. The bulk of the enlisted women had clerical and stenographic civilian backgrounds—and the Coast Guard put them to work using these much-needed skills. As the authors of Three Years Behind the Mast explain, exciting jobs for most could be 'few and far between'. Yet they add that not all SPARs assigned to paperwork found it "boring". Even though some jobs were "humble, humdrum duties", as the authors put it, the women nevertheless could see how their contributions "fit into the overall picture". Though the majority of enlisted women worked in clerical positions—with many of them earning petty officer ratings as yeoman and storekeepers—enlisted personnel were found in nearly every job classification. As the Behind the Mast authors describe, "Spars" did everything from "baking pies to rigging parachutes and driving jeeps".

Women reservists were initially prohibited by law from serving in USCG districts outside the continental United States. But in late 1944, Congress lifted the prohibition, and this allowed SPARs to serve overseas. For those who were in good health and had at least one year of service, the authorization meant they could request a transfer to Hawaii or Alaska (then U.S. territories). The Coast Guard sent about 200 women to serve in Hawaii, and another 200 to Alaska where they performed roughly the same kind of work (and held the same ratings) as at mainland stations.

=== LORAN–Long Range Aid to Navigation ===
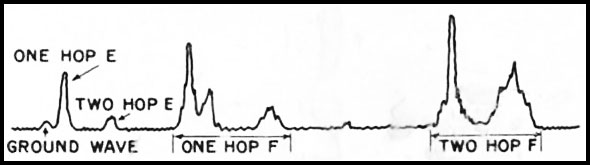
The signal from a single LORAN transmitter would be received several times from several directions. This image shows the weak groundwave arriving first, then signals after one and two hops off the ionosphere's E layer and finally one and two hops off the F layer. Operator skill was needed to tell these apart.

LORAN was a land-based radio navigation system—operated by the U.S. Coast Guard—that was developed during World War II at the Massachusetts Institute of Technology (MIT) to monitor the location of ships at sea or aircraft in flight. For instance, radio signals transmitted from two shore stations could be picked up by a ship traveling between them. The signals would be picked up on a ship's LORAN receiver, and then monitoring stations would be able to calculate a ship's exact location by measuring the amount of time each signal took to reach such ship.

The LORAN monitoring stations set up by the Coast Guard were all manned by male coast guardsmen, but by the summer of 1943 it was decided that–within the continental U.S–they would be staffed by SPAR personnel. A select group of officers and enlisted SPARs were chosen to work at LORAN monitoring stations. To qualify for duty at these stations, reservists had to complete two months of instruction at MIT that focused on the operation and maintenance of the navigation system. During training at MIT, LORAN's secrecy was so intense that each day after class all student paperwork and notebooks were confiscated and secured.

Chatham, Massachusetts–located at the southeast tip of Cape Cod–was the first LORAN monitoring station to be staffed by the SPARs. Lieutenant Vera Hamerschlag was in command of the 12-female unit. On duty, they had to sit in a darkened room for four hours at a time and watch and receive the LORAN signals every two minutes. The staff was instructed not to mention the word LORAN outside of the station. Lieutenant Hamerschlag said, "The thought that we were participating in a system that was playing such an important part of winning the war gave us a feeling of being as close to the front lines as was possible for SPARs." Chatham was believed to have been–at the time–the only all-female staffed monitoring station of its kind in the world. The unit staff at Chatham received a letter from Coast Guard headquarters commending them for their work at the station.

The SPARs work with the LORAN might have been the most unique and important of their service, although it was the least publicized.

== Women of the SPARs ==
The average SPAR officer was 29 years old, single, and a college graduate. She had worked seven years in a professional or managerial position (typically in education or government) before entering the service. The average enlisted SPAR was 24 years old, single, a high school graduate, and had worked for more than three years in a clerical or sales position before recruitment. In most cases, SPARs likely came from the states of Massachusetts; New York; Pennsylvania; Illinois; Ohio or California.

In their off-duty hours, SPARs contributed time and effort to many community and wartime causes. Some became active nurse's aides or rolled bandages for the Red Cross; others donated blood to blood banks; some visited servicemen in convalescent hospitals, and others collected gifts for the men overseas. Many of them were also involved in the March of Dimes campaigns and war chest or war bond drives. Based on their service, both officers and enlisted were awarded service ribbons and medals, and some were acknowledged for their outstanding contributions to the Women's Reserve and the country.

In reporting on their own personal experience as SPARs, the authors of Three Years Behind the Mast evaluate the overall positive experience had by many who served in the Women's Reserve, describing a sense of kinship that developed between them. Written at the end of the war (just after the demobilization of the Reserve), their "history of the Spars" relates the value of their service in this way: "We were taking away many intangible things that should be of value to us for the rest of our lives—increased tolerance, a new sense of self-confidence, a better idea of how to live and work with all kinds of people, [and] a keener recognition of our responsibility as world citizens."

== Uniforms ==
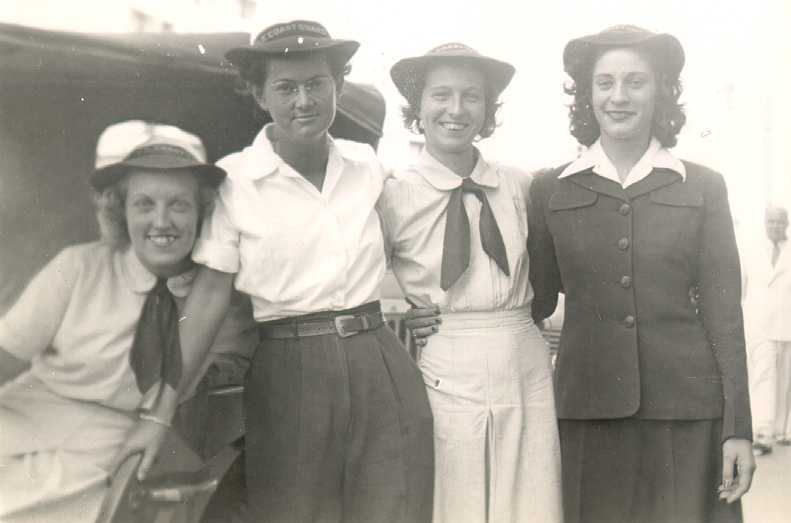
Enlisted SPARs during World War II

The U.S. Navy Uniform Board made the decisions regarding uniforms and gear to be worn by the SPARs. Except for service insignias, the uniforms worn by the USCG female reservists were similar in design to those created for and worn by the WAVES. Stratton described the selection process in the following way:

Next we had to decide what the women were going to wear. The WAVES had a very good-looking uniform designed by Mainbocher. Some male Coast Guardsman had proposed a design for the SPARs uniform. Which would be used? With great solemnity, a whole roomful of admirals debated on this, and finally decided on the WAVES uniform with Coast Guard insignia. I didn't have much voice in choosing what we would wear.

The standard Mainbocher-designed uniform was made of navy-blue wool, and it consisted of a single-breasted jacket, worn with a six-gored skirt, along with a white shirt and dark blue tie. Matching accessories included: black oxfords or plain black pumps; a brimmed hat; black gloves; a black leather purse, and both rain and winter coats. The summer uniform was similar to the standard, but it was made of white Palm Beach cloth, tropical worsted or other lightweight fabrics and the shoes were white leather oxfords or pumps. Work wear for summer consisted of a grey and white striped seersucker dress and a jacket.

== Demobilization ==
=== End of World War II ===
Following the Victory over Japan (V-J Day) in August 1945, the USCG demobilization effort began. SPAR personnel were gradually discharged; they were separated from the service on a point system or on the basis of their jobs. To aid in the process, many SPARs were reassigned to Coast Guard personnel separation centers where they assisted in the demobilization of both male and female reservists. These reassigned reservists were themselves later separated when demobilization was considered complete. By the middle of 1946, nearly all USCG female reservists had been discharged.

=== Post–World War II ===
The Women's Reserve (SPARs) was inactivated on July 25, 1947, but later reactivated as the USCG Women's Volunteer Reserve on November 1, 1949, the eve of the Korean War. During the Korean conflict (1950–1953), the Coast Guard actively recruited former SPARs—both officers and enlisted personnel—for the volunteer reserve. Enlistment was for a three-year period. Approximately 200 former SPARs entered the Women's Volunteer Reserve and served during the Korean War. By 1968, about 158 women remained as active volunteer reservists. In 1973–according to the USCG–Congress enacted legislation ending the Women's Volunteer Reserve and allowing women to be officially integrated into active duty or the reserve. Following the change, those enlisted female reservists then serving on active duty were given the choice of enlisting in the regular USCG or completing their reserve enlistments.

== Legacy ==
In his foreword to Three Years Behind the Mast, Commodore James A. Hirshfield saluted the women of the SPARs for their wartime service. In part, this is what he wrote:

The Spars asked no favors and no privileges. They, like most Americans, knew there was a job to be done and they went to work. The amazement of some of their hard-bitten superiors is legendary. With enthusiasm, with efficiency, and with a minimum of fanfare, these young women began to take over[...] The Service was fortunate in having the help of the 10,000 Spars who volunteered for duty in the Coast Guard when their country needed them, and carried the job through to a successful finish.

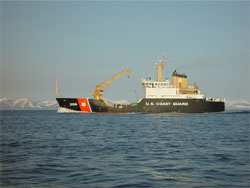
USCGC Spar (WLB-206)

The USCG has honored the Women's Reserve by naming two Coast Guard cutters after them, using the Spars nautical nickname. USCGC Spar (WLB-403) was a 180-foot (55 m) seagoing buoy tender that was commissioned on June 12, 1944. She had a complement of six officers and 74 enlisted in 1945, and in 1966 her complement was four officers, two warrant officers, and 47 enlisted. The cutter was decommissioned on February 28, 1997. The second vessel was USCGC Spar (WLB-206)—a 225-foot (69 m) seagoing buoy tender that was commissioned on August 3, 2001. As of the spring of 2022, she was still in active service with a complement of eight officers and 42 enlisted.

== Notable people ==
- Jeanne L. Block"Jack and Jeanne Block". www.foundationpsp.org. Archived from the original on October 12, 2018.
- Florence Finch "The Long Blue Line". United States Coast Guard.
- Eleanor C. L’Ecuyer
- Hellen M. Linkswiler Greger, J. L. (March 2002). "Hellen M. Linkswiler (1912–1984)". The Journal of Nutrition. 132 (3): 333–334. doi:10.1093/jn/132.3.333. PMID 11880550.
- Edith Munro Meyers, Donald W. (April 9, 2017). "It Happened Here: South Cle Elum man became first Coast Guardsman to win Medal of Honor". Yakima Herald-Republic.

== See also ==
- United States Marine Corps Women's Reserve
- Women in the Air Force (WAF)
- Women's Army Corps (WAC)
- Women Airforce Service Pilots (WASP)
- Women's Royal Australian Naval Service
- Women's Royal Naval Service (British) "Wrens"
- Women's Auxiliary Air Force (British)
- Women's Royal Canadian Naval Service
