= USCGC Spar (WLB-206) =

U.S. Coast Guard seagoing buoy tender

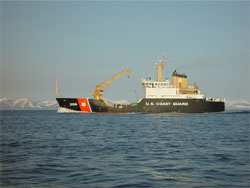
- USCGC Spar (WLB-206)

History

United States
- Name: USCGC Spar
- Builder: Marinette Marine Corporation
- Laid down: 15 December 1999
- Launched: 12 August 2000
- Commissioned: 3 August 2001
- Home port: Duluth, Minnesota
- Identification: IMO number: 9257838; MMSI number: 368856000; Callsign: NJAR
- Nickname(s): The Aleutian Keeper
- Status: Ship in active service
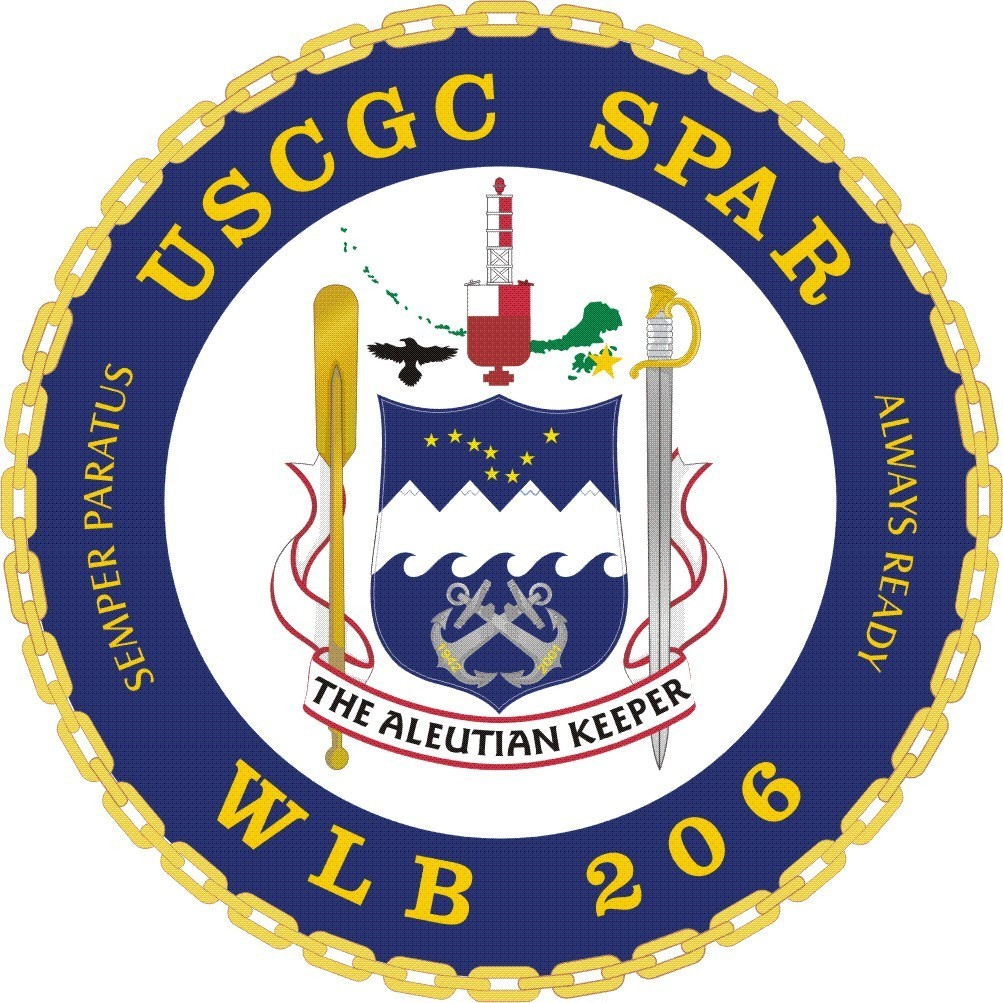
- Badge

General characteristics
- Displacement: 2,000 long tons (2,000 t) (full load)
- Length: 225 ft (69 m)
- Beam: 46 ft (14 m)
- Draft: 13 ft (4.0 m)
- Installed power: 2 × Caterpillar 3608 Engines; 3,100 shp (2,300 kW) each
- Propulsion: One variable-pitch propeller
- Speed: 15 kn (28 km/h; 17 mph) at full load displacement; (80% rated power)
- Range: 6,000 nmi (11,000 km; 6,900 mi) at 12 kn (22 km/h; 14 mph)
- Complement: 8 Officers; 40 Enlisted
- Armament: 2 x .50 caliber machine guns

USCGC Spar (WLB-206) is a United States Coast Guard Juniper-class seagoing buoy tender home-ported in Duluth, Minnesota. The ship maintains aids to navigation in the Twin Ports and Great Lakes.

== Construction ==
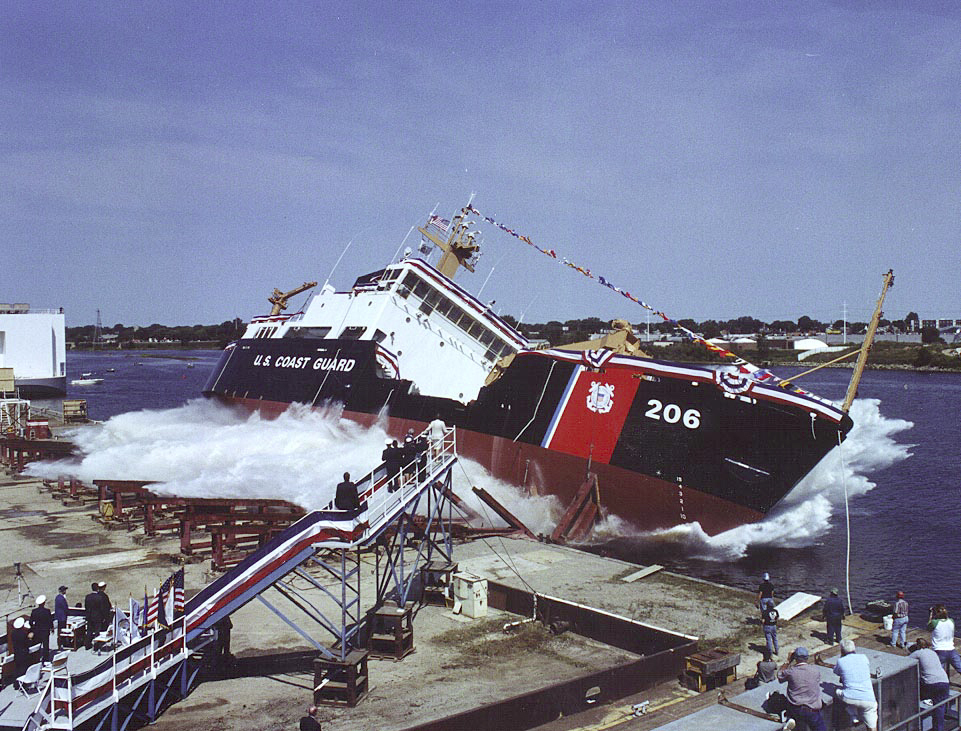
Launch of USCGC Spar

The keel for Spar was laid on December 15, 1999 at Marinette Marine Corporation in Wisconsin. Spar was launched on August 12, 2000. She was christened by US attorney general Janet Reno. Also speaking at her launch ceremony was US senator Herb Kohl, and US Coast Guard Vice Admiral Timothy Josiah. She was the sixth of the fourteen Juniper-class ships launched.

Her hull is constructed of welded steel plates. She is 225 feet (69 m) long and has a beam of 46 feet (14 m). She is capable of maintaining a sustained speed of 15 knots. The ship has thirteen diesel fuel tanks capable of holding 74,498 gallons. Spar has an unrefueled range of 6,000 miles at 12 knots.

Spar has a single variable-pitch propeller that is powered by two Caterpillar 3608 Diesel engines, each with an indicated 3,100 shp. There are two electric maneuvering thrusters, the bow thruster producing 460 hp and the stern thruster producing 550 hp. The thrusters act as part of a dynamic positioning system that is capable of maintaining the ship within five meters of a fixed position on the sea in winds up to 30 knots and seas up to 8 feet (2.4 m). This allows the crew to work on buoys in difficult weather conditions.

The ship's crane extends to 60 feet (18 m) and can lift 40,000 pounds (18,000 kg) onto her buoy deck, which is 2,875 square feet in area.

Spar is armed with two 50-caliber machine guns and a variety of small arms for boarding operations.

The cutter is named after the former U.S. Coast Guard Women's Reserves, also known as SPARS from the Latin and English translations of the Coast Guard Motto: Semper Paratus; Always Ready! She is the second Coast Guard ship of this name. The first USCGC Spar (WLB-403) was launched in 1943.

== Operational history ==
After launch and sea trials, Spar sailed from Marinette, Wisconsin, to Kodiak, Alaska, from March to June 2001. She was commissioned later that year on August 3.

Spar's primary mission is to maintain aids to navigation. In 2007, her area of responsibility extended from Kodiak in the east to Attu in the western Aleutians and north into the Bering Sea, including the Pribilof Islands. As of 2019, this area included 148 fixed and floating aids to navigation. Spar also supports a number of other Coast Guard missions including search and rescue, fisheries law enforcement, light icebreaking, and oil spill response. She cooperates with NOAA to maintain weather buoys in her area of responsibility and to collect hydrographic data to update charts.

In her search and rescue function, Spar towed the disabled fishing vessel Equinox to Kodiak in 2008. The ship was dispatched to the disabled fishing vessel Lady Gudny in January 2017. Spar was able to secure a tow line on the fishing boat, but it broke in the heavy seas and high winds. The broken tow line wrapped around Spar's propeller, disabling the ship. She was towed back to Kodiak by a commercial tugboat.

In 2012 Spar was part of a large Coast Guard response to the drifting Kulluk drilling platform.

During the summer of 2013 Spar participated in the Coast Guard's Arctic Shield 2013 program to test and exercise the ability to operate in Arctic waters. Spar successfully deployed her Vessel of Opportunity Skimming System (VOSS) to practice oil spill recovery. The ship earned the special operations service ribbon for this deployment.

In 2021 USCGC Alder and Spar switched home ports. After undergoing a refit in Baltimore, she sailed for her new home port arriving in Duluth, Minnesota on March 30, 2022.

In 2024 Spar responded to the distress call of lake freighter Michipicoten.

== Accomplishments ==
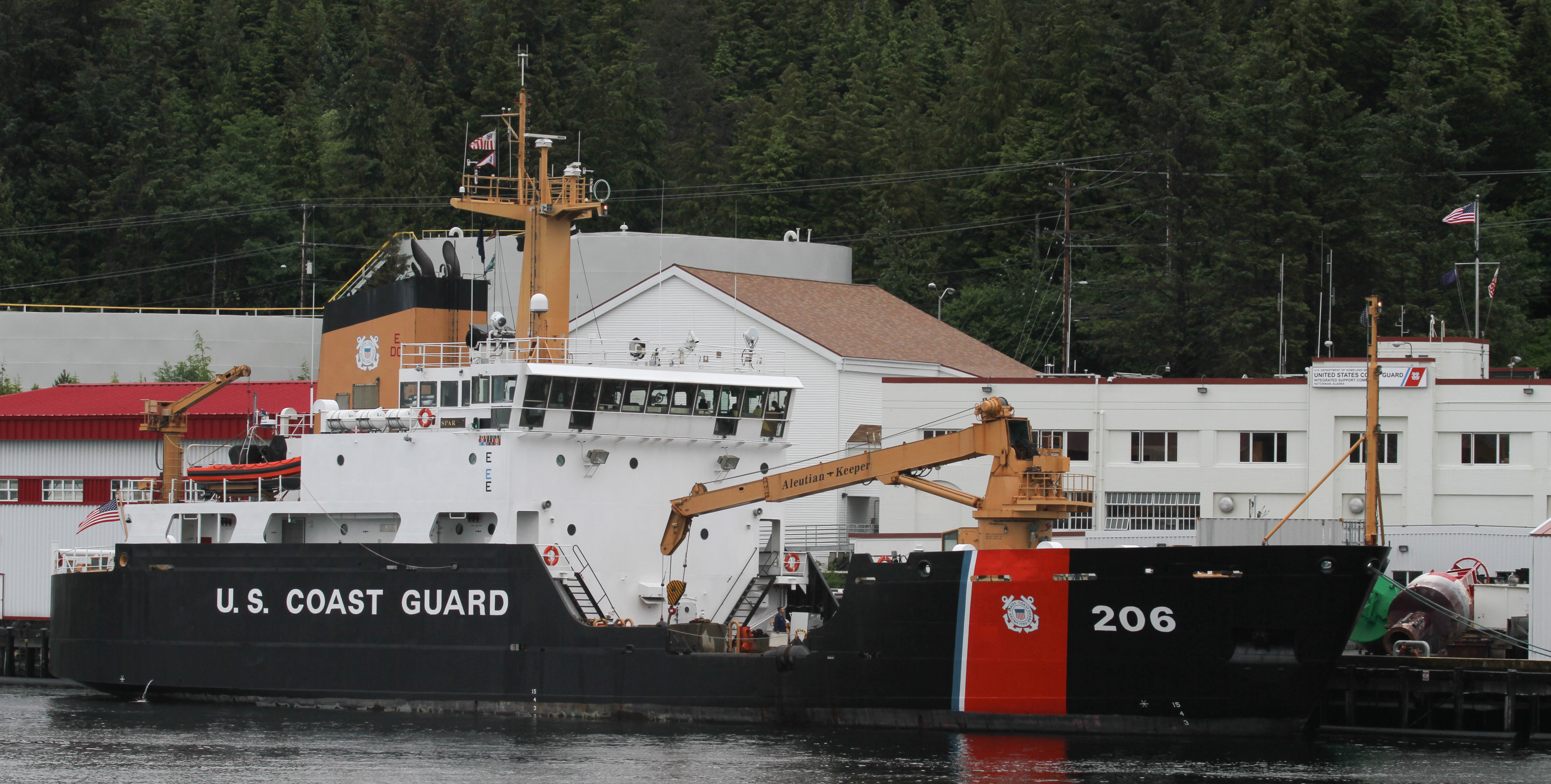
USCGC Spar docked in Ketchikan

In 2012, Spar was adopted as honorary ship of the Sun’aq Tribe of Kodiak, the only known cutter to have received such a title.

As part of the Coast Guard's community outreach program, Spar made annual “Santa to the Villages” trips to remote communities on Kodiak Island. Village elders later credited this relationship for trust in the federal government’s response when the Mobile Offshore Drilling Unit Kulluk ran aground on Tribal land.

In 2013, Spar’s law enforcement boardings of gold dredge vessels around Nome carried the Coast Guard’s mission to a national audience through the reality television series Bering Sea Gold.
