= List of shipwrecks in 2003 =

The list of shipwrecks in 2003 includes ships sunk, foundered, grounded, or otherwise lost during 2003.

table of contents
2003
Jan	Feb	Mar	Apr
May	Jun	Jul	Aug
Sep	Oct	Nov	Dec
Unknown date

== January ==
=== 1 January ===
List of shipwrecks: 1 January 2003
Ship	State	Description
Vicky	Turkey	The cargo ship ran aground on the wreck of Tricolor (Norway) in the English Channel off Dunkirk, Nord, France. Later refloated.

=== 3 January ===
List of shipwrecks: 3 January 2003
Ship	State	Description
Vermontborg	Romania	This new ship, under tow from Romania to Germany, broke free and came aground on the Guernsey, Channel Islands coast.

=== 5 January ===
List of shipwrecks: 5 January 2003
Ship	State	Description
Pioneer	United States	In disrepair and in danger of sinking in the boat harbor at Kodiak, Alaska, the 80-foot (24.4 m) halibut schooner was scuttled by her owner in 260 feet (79 m) of water in the Gulf of Alaska approximately 6 nautical miles (11 km) off Cape Chiniak (57°37′N 152°10′W) on Kodiak Island.

=== 11 January ===
List of shipwrecks: 11 January 2003
Ship	State	Description
Sunrunner	United States	The 58-foot (17.7 m) longline cod-fishing vessel sank off Twoheaded Island (56°54′N 153°35′W) in the Kodiak Archipelago. A United States Coast Guard helicopter and the fishing vessel Heritage (United States) rescued her entire crew of five.

=== 24 January ===
List of shipwrecks: 24 January 2003
Ship	State	Description
Combine	United States	The 41-foot (12 m) longline cod-fishing vessel struck a pinnacle off Popof Island (57°46′00″N 152°24′10″W) in the Kodiak Archipelago about 5 nautical miles (9.3 km) east of Kodiak, Alaska. The fishing vessel Highliner (United States) rescued her crew of three.

== February ==
=== 17 February ===
List of shipwrecks: 17 February 2003
Ship	State	Description
Tor I	Tonga	The cargo ship sank in the Mediterranean Sea between Malta and Sicily, Italy with the loss of all eight crew.

=== 18 February ===
List of shipwrecks: 18 February 2003
Ship	State	Description
Myra Jean	United States	The 42-foot (13 m) Alaska pollock trawler struck a rock, capsized and sank at the head of Wells Bay (60°53′30″N 147°28′30″W) in Prince William Sound on the south-central coast of Alaska. The fishing vessel Anna Lee (United States) rescued her crew of two.

== March ==
=== 16 March ===
List of shipwrecks: 16 March 2003
Ship	State	Description
Copa Casino	Unknown	The cruise ship sank off the coast of the Dominican Republic while on her last voyage to Alang, India, for scrapping.

=== 21 March ===
List of shipwrecks: 21 March 2003
Ship	State	Description
Bering Sea	United States	The 45-foot (14 m) longline halibut-fishing vessel was wrecked on the northwest coast of Yakobi Island in the Alexander Archipelago near Cape Bingham (58°05′30″N 136°31′00″W) in Southeast Alaska. All three people and a dog on board abandoned ship in a life raft and were rescued by a United States Coast Guard helicopter.

=== 22 March ===
List of shipwrecks: 22 March 2003
Ship	State	Description
RMS Mulheim	Antigua and Barbuda	RMS Mulheim, September 2003. The cargo ship ran aground at Sennen Cove, United Kingdom. She was declared a constructive total loss on 24 March.

=== 24 March ===
List of shipwrecks: 24 March 2003
Ship	State	Description
New Viking	United States	The 52-foot (15.8 m) crab-fishing vessel sank in Southeast Alaska near Sullivan Island State Marine Park (58.9633°N 135.3224°W) 15 nautical miles (28 km) southwest of Eldred Rock. The only person aboard abandoned ship in a skiff and was rescued by the United States Coast Guard.

=== 27 March ===
List of shipwrecks: 27 March 2003
Ship	State	Description
Al-Mansur	Iraq	Iraq War: The 360 feet (110 m) and 7,359 tons luxury yacht, personal property of Iraqi dictator Saddam Hussein, was hit while moored at Basra by a Maverick missile launched by a Lockheed S-3 Viking recce aircraft from USS Constellation (United States Navy), followed by several waves of F/A-18s armed with gravity bombs. The yacht was set ablaze but remained afloat; it eventually capsized some months later.

== April ==
=== 2 April ===
List of shipwrecks: 2 April 2003
Ship	State	Description
USS Bigelow	United States Navy	The decommissioned Forrest Sherman-class destroyer was sunk as a target.

=== 11 April ===
List of shipwrecks: 11 April 2003
Ship	State	Description
ROCS Lai Yang	Republic of China Navy	The decommissioned Gearing-class destroyer was sunk as an artificial reef. (Formerly USS Leonard F. Mason (United States Navy) the ship's name in Republic of China Navy service also is reported as ROCS Shuei Yang.)

=== 16 April ===
List of shipwrecks: 16 April 2003
Ship	State	Description
361	People's Liberation Army Navy	The Ming-class submarine was lost due to an engine run-on accident in the Bohai Sea. All seventy crew suffocated.

=== 22 April ===
List of shipwrecks: 22 April 2003
Ship	State	Description
Al Munassir	Royal Navy of Oman	The vessel was sunk as an artificial reef off the coast of Muscat.

=== 24 April ===
List of shipwrecks: 24 April 2003
Ship	State	Description
USS Weehawken	United States Navy	The decommissioned Natick-class tugboat was sunk as a target 50 nautical miles (93 km) northeast of Guam.

=== 25 April ===
List of shipwrecks: 25 April 2003
Ship	State	Description
USS Ketchikan	United States Navy	The decommissioned Natick-class tugboat was sunk as a target 50 nautical miles (93 km) northeast of Guam.

=== 26 April ===
List of shipwrecks: 26 April 2003
Ship	State	Description
USS Nogalesen	United States Navy	The decommissioned Natick-class tugboat was sunk as a target 50 nautical miles (93 km) northeast of Guam.

=== 27 April ===
List of shipwrecks: 27 April 2003
Ship	State	Description
USS Mandan	United States Navy	The decommissioned Natick-class tugboat was sunk as a target 50 nautical miles (93 km) northeast of Guam.

=== 29 April ===
List of shipwrecks: 29 April 2003
Ship	State	Description
Brittany Kaye	United States	The 29-foot (8.8 m) herring gillnetter struck a rock and sank in Kulukak Bay (58°49′N 159°44′W) on the south-central coast of Alaska, 60 nautical miles (110 km) southeast of Togiak. Her crew of two survived. At low tide she was seen to be sitting on mud but was deemed too badly damaged to be refloated.

=== Unknown date ===
List of shipwrecks: Unknown April 2003
Ship	State	Description
Grampian Duke	United Kingdom	The 115.4-foot (35.2 m), 234-ton trawler, sprung a leak in her engine room and sank 2,590 miles (4,170 km) west of Brest, France, in the Atlantic Ocean on either 4 April or 4 May.

== May ==
=== 13 May ===
List of shipwrecks: 13 May 2003
Ship	State	Description
HMS Tireless	Royal Navy	The Trafalgar-class submarine collided underwater with an iceberg in the Arctic Ocean and was damaged.

=== 30 May ===
List of shipwrecks: 30 May 2003
Ship	State	Description
Racona II	United States	The 72-foot (22 m) vessel sank in the Gulf of Alaska 2 nautical miles (3.7 km) off Spruce Cape (57°49′15″N 152°20′00″W) near Kodiak, Alaska. The fishing vessel Compromise (United States) rescued her two-man crew.

=== 31 May ===
List of shipwrecks: 31 May 2003
Ship	State	Description
Fu Shan Hai	China	The bulk carrier collided with Gdynia (Cyprus) off Bornholm, Denmark, and sank.

=== Unknown date ===
List of shipwrecks: unknown May 2003
Ship	State	Description
Grampian Duke	United Kingdom	The 115.4-foot (35.2 m), 234-ton trawler, sprung a leak in her engine room and sank 2,590 miles (4,170 km) west of Brest, France, in the Atlantic Ocean on either 4 April or 4 May.

== June ==
=== 12 June ===
List of shipwrecks: 12 June 2003
Ship	State	Description
Al-Mansur	Iraqi Navy	Saddam Hussein's presidential yacht was bombed and damaged at Basra by Grumman F-14 Tomcat aircraft of the United States Navy in March 2003 during the Iraq War. The vessel capsized and sank at dock at Basrah, Iraq, after being looted.

=== 14 June ===
List of shipwrecks: 14 June 2003
Ship	State	Description
Taki-Tooo	United States	The 32-foot (9.8 m) chartered fishing boat capsized off the Oregon Coast near Tillamook Bay while crossing the bar. Eleven people, including the skipper, perished.

=== 19 June ===
List of shipwrecks: 19 June 2003
Ship	State	Description
ex-USS Richard E. Byrd	Hellenic Navy	The decommissioned Charles F. Adams-class guided-missile destroyer was sunk as a target by Greek forces after sale to Greece and cannibalization for spare parts.

=== 23 June ===
List of shipwrecks: 23 June 2003
Ship	State	Description
Mohawk Chief	United States	The 93-foot (28 m) tugboat was scuttled as an artificial reef south of Destin, Florida (30°08′N 86°43′W) in 125 feet (38 m) of water in the Gulf of Mexico.

=== 27 June ===
List of shipwrecks: 27 June 2003
Ship	State	Description
Unidentified barge	United States	A retired 75-foot (22.9 m) barge was scuttled as an artificial reef in the North Atlantic Ocean 2 nautical miles (3.7 km; 2.3 mi) off Mantoloking, New Jersey, in 80 feet (24 m) of water at 40°03.560′N 073°59.300′W. Her wreck is known as "Barbara Ann."
Unidentified barge	United States	A retired 50-foot (15.2 m) barge was scuttled as an artificial reef in the North Atlantic Ocean 2 nautical miles (3.7 km; 2.3 mi) off Mantoloking, New Jersey, in 80 feet (24 m) of water at 40°03.585′N 073°59.391′W. Her wreck is known as the "Swensen Barge."

== July ==
=== 8 July ===
List of shipwrecks: 8 July 2003
Ship	State	Description
Miss Everett	United States	The 34-foot (10.4 m) troller sank near Kruzof Island in the Alexander Archipelago in Southeast Alaska, approximately 10 nautical miles (19 km) north of Sitka, Alaska. The only person aboard perished.
Nazreen-1	Bangladesh	The ferry sank in the Meghna River near Chandpur, Bangladesh, causing the deaths of 400 people.

=== 17 July ===
List of shipwrecks: 17 July 2003
Ship	State	Description
Four Daughters	United States	The 86-foot (26.2 m) fishing trawler and clam dredger sank on her maiden voyage in 130 feet (40 m) of water in the North Atlantic Ocean 52 nautical miles (96 km) southeast of Sandy Hook, New Jersey, at 39°59.46′N 073°11.25′W.

=== 21 July ===
List of shipwrecks: 21 July 2003
Ship	State	Description
USS Dixon	United States Navy	The decommissioned L. Y. Spear-class submarine tender was sunk as a target in the Atlantic Ocean southeast of Charleston, South Carolina, at 31°16′17.9″N 073°57′46.2″W.
USS Seneca	United States Navy	The decommissioned Navajo-class tugboat was sunk as a target in the Atlantic Ocean off North Carolina.

=== 22 July ===
List of shipwrecks: 22 July 2003
Ship	State	Description
HMCS Nipigon	Maritime Command	The decommissioned Mackenzie-class destroyer was sunk in the St. Lawrence River northeast of Rimouski as an artificial reef.
USS Samuel Gompers	United States Navy	The decommissioned Samuel Gompers-class destroyer tender sank in the Atlantic Ocean off North Carolina at 31°17′N 073°51′W after being used as a target for Harpoon missiles and aerial bombs the previous day.

=== 28 July ===
List of shipwrecks: 28 July 2003
Ship	State	Description
Tasman Spirit	Greece	The tanker ran aground in the Arabian Sea off Karachi, Pakistan. She broke up and sank on 14 August.

=== 29 July ===
List of shipwrecks: 29 July 2003
Ship	State	Description
USS Ingersoll	United States Navy	The decommissioned Spruance-class destroyer was sunk as a target.

=== 30 July ===
List of shipwrecks: 30 July 2003
Ship	State	Description
Neptun	Germany	The 16.11-metre (52.9 ft) fishing cutter ran aground, heeled over and sank on her side in shallow water in the channel at Norddeich. The wreck as later salvaged.

== August ==
=== 1 August ===
List of shipwrecks: 1 August 2003
Ship	State	Description
USS Leftwich	United States Navy	The decommissioned Spruance-class destroyer was sunk as a target in the Pacific Ocean northwest of Hawaii at 22°48′47″N 160°34′00″W.
USS Merrill	United States Navy	The decommissioned Spruance-class destroyer was sunk as a target in the Pacific Ocean northwest of Hawaii at 22°43′53″N 160°29′23″W.

=== 4 August ===
List of shipwrecks: 4 August 2003
Ship	State	Description
United Malika	Morocco	United Malika The reefer ship ran aground near Ras Nouadhibou in Mauritania. Her crew were rescued by the Mauritanian Navy.

=== 15 August ===
List of shipwrecks: 15 August 2003
Ship	State	Description
USS Downes	United States Navy	The decommissioned Knox-class frigate was sunk as a target near Mare Island, California, at 31°10′01″N 119°48′03″W.
USS Henry B. Wilson	United States Navy	The decommissioned Charles F. Adams-class guided-missile destroyer was sunk as a target.

=== 20 August ===
List of shipwrecks: 20 August 2003
Ship	State	Description
Donna Ann	United States	The 47-gross ton, 49.7-or-58-foot (15.1 or 17.7 m) fishing vessel dragged her anchor and was stranded on the beach in Tanglefoot Bay (57°34′30″N 154°29′30″W) near Karluk, Alaska. Her crew survived.

=== 28 August ===
List of shipwrecks: 28 August 2003
Ship	State	Description
North Star	United States	The 55-foot (17 m) scallop trawler capsized and sank in the Atlantic Ocean in 100 feet (30 m) of water in the Stellwagen Bank National Marine Sanctuary (42°23′N 70°21′W). The two crew members were picked up by Half Fast.

=== 30 August ===
List of shipwrecks: 30 August 2003
Ship	State	Description
K-159	Russian Navy	The November-class submarine sank in the Barents Sea while under tow to a scrapyard. Nine of her ten crew were killed.

== September ==
=== 11 September ===
List of shipwrecks: 11 September 2003
Ship	State	Description
Moby Magic	Italy	The ferry ran aground in the Mediterranean Sea off Porto Cervo, Sardinia. All 160 people on board were rescued.

=== 25 September ===
List of shipwrecks: 25 September 2003
Ship	State	Description
A. J. McAllister	United States	The retired 106-foot (32 m), 263-gross ton tug was scuttled as an artificial reef in the North Atlantic Ocean east of Cape May, New Jersey, at 38°58.004′N 074°10.721′W.
Diver's Abyss	United States	The retired 104-foot (32 m) tug was scuttled as an artificial reef in the North Atlantic Ocean east of Cape May, New Jersey, at 38°57.984′N 074°10.771′W.

== October ==
=== 8 October ===
List of shipwrecks: 8 October 2003
Ship	State	Description
ROCS Fu Yang	Republic of China Navy	The decommissioned Gearing-class destroyer was sunk as a target.

=== 14 October ===
List of shipwrecks: 14 October 2003
Ship	State	Description
ROCS An Yang	Republic of China Navy	The decommissioned Fletcher-class destroyer was sunk as a target.
ROCS Huei Yang	Republic of China Navy	The decommissioned Allen M. Sumner-class guided-missile destroyer was sunk as a target.

=== 15 October ===
List of shipwrecks: 15 October 2003
Ship	State	Description
Andrew J. Barberi	United States	The ferry collided at full speed with a pier at Staten Island, New York. Eleven people were killed and seventy-one were injured. The ship was later repaired and returned to service.

=== 25 October ===
List of shipwrecks: 25 October 2003
Ship	State	Description
USS Hartford	United States Navy	USS Hartford USS Hartford grounding: The Los Angeles-class submarine ran aground at La Maddalena, Sardinia, Italy. She was subsequently repaired and returned to service

== November ==
=== 7 November ===
List of shipwrecks: 7 November 2003
Ship	State	Description
Jay Jay	United States	The retired 90-foot (27 m) tug was scuttled as an artificial reef in the North Atlantic Ocean south of Long Island 2.5 nautical miles (4.6 km) off Moriches Inlet, New York.

=== 18 November ===
List of shipwrecks: 18 November 2003
Ship	State	Description
USS Yosemite	United States Navy	The decommissioned destroyer tender was sunk as a target.

=== 25 November ===
List of shipwrecks: 25 November 2003
Ship	State	Description
Dieu Merci	Democratic Republic of the Congo	The ferry capsized and sank in Lake Mai-Ndombe, killing 163 people on board. Over 200 people were rescued.

== December ==
=== 1 December ===
List of shipwrecks: 24 December 2003
Ship	State	Description
Jassim	Bolivia	The vessel sank while anchored at Wingate reef, Sudan about 1,113.11 metres (3,651.9 ft) away from the wreck of Umbria.

=== 9 December ===
List of shipwrecks: 24 December 2003
Ship	State	Description
Stellamare	Netherlands	The Dutch heavy-lift vessel capsized while loading power generator components at the Port of Albany with the loss of three crew members. A United States Coast Guard investigation found that capsize occurred because of the inexperience of the officers and crew in conducting heavy-lift loading operations in fresh water and miscommunications between the Russian crew and Dutch officers over ballasting requirements. The ship was salvaged but declared a constructive total loss.

=== 24 December ===
List of shipwrecks: 24 December 2003
Ship	State	Description
Elizabeth	Unknown	The cargo ship sank in the Aegean Sea off Santorini, Greece. Eight crew were rescued.

== Unknown date ==
List of shipwrecks: Unknown date 2003
Ship	State	Description
Alec N	United States	The retired 45-foot (14 m) fishing trawler was scuttled as an artificial reef in the North Atlantic Ocean off Fire Island south of Long Island, New York sometime in 2003.
Mary N	United States	The retired 50-foot (15 m) fishing trawler and clam dredger was scuttled as an artificial reef in the North Atlantic Ocean off Fire Island south of Long Island, New York sometime in 2003.
SLNS P-413	Sri Lanka Navy	Sri Lankan Civil War: The patrol boat was sunk by the Liberation Tigers of Tamil Eelam sometime in 2003.
SLNS P-416	Sri Lanka Navy	Sri Lankan Civil War: The patrol boat was sunk by the Liberation Tigers of Tamil Eelam sometime in 2003.
SLNS P-495	Sri Lanka Navy	Sri Lankan Civil War: The patrol boat was sunk by the Liberation Tigers of Tamil Eelam sometime in 2003.
