= Wanamassa =

Wanamassa may refer to:

People

- Wanamassa (Native American), a Native American leader of the 17th century

Places

- Wanamassa, New Jersey, a census-designated place and unincorporated area within Ocean Township, in Monmouth County

Ships

- USS Wanamassa (YTB-820), a United States Navy large harbor tug in commission since 1973
