= Metacom (YTB-829) =

Tugboat of the United States Navy

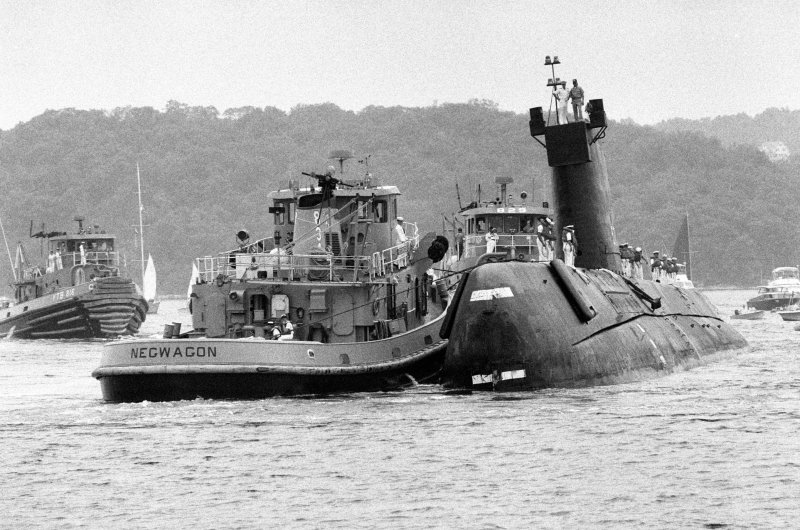
- Metacom (YTB-829) forward of Negwagon (YTB-834), assists in mooring the nuclear-powered attack submarine ex-Nautilus (SSN-571) upon her arrival at pier 33, Naval Submarine Base, New London, 6 July 1985.

History

United States
- Awarded: 5 June 1973
- Builder: Marinette Marine, Marinette, Wisconsin
- Laid down: 13 November 1973
- Launched: 19 June 1974
- In service: 21 September 1974
- Stricken: 5 January 2001
- Identification: MMSI number: 366999296; Callsign: AEDN
- Fate: Transferred to the Army Corps of Engineers, 5 January 2001

General characteristics
- Class & type: Natick-class large harbor tug
- Displacement: 283 long tons (288 t) (light); 356 long tons (362 t) (full)
- Length: 109 ft (33 m)
- Beam: 31 ft (9.4 m)
- Draft: 14 ft (4.3 m)
- Speed: 12 knots (14 mph; 22 km/h)
- Complement: 12
- Armament: None

Metacom (YTB-829) was a United States Navy Natick-class large harbor tug.

== Construction ==
The contract for Metacom was awarded 5 June 1973. She was laid down on 13 November 1973 at Marinette, Wisconsin, by Marinette Marine and launched 19 June 1974.

== Operational history ==
Metacom served at Naval Submarine Base New London. Stricken from the Navy List 5 January 2001, ex-Metacom was transferred to the Army Corps of Engineers where she was renamed Demolen.
