= Dekanawida (ship) =

USS Dekanawida may refer to the following ships operated by the United States Navy named for Dekanawida, a co-founder of the Iroquois Confederacy:

- Dekanawida (YTB-334), ex U.S. Army Mine Planter Colonel George Armistead, ex commercial tugboat Mary Foss, was a Navy tug (1942–1946) during World War II.
- Dekanawida (YTB-831) is a Natick-class tugboat currently serving Naval Station Guantanamo Bay, Cuba.
