= Tuskegee (disambiguation) =

Tuskegee, Alabama is a city in the United States.

Tuskegee may also refer to:

- Tuskegee Airmen, a group of World War II African American pilots
- Tuskegee Syphilis Study, a 40-year medical study on African American men now known for its racial discrimination and unethical practices
- Tuskegee (album), a 2012 album by American soul singer Lionel Richie
- Tuskegee (Cherokee town), a village site in Tennessee, U.S., the childhood home of Sequoyah
- Tuskegee (Martian crater)
- Tuskegee (YTB-806), a United States Navy Natick-class large harbor tug
- Tuskegee Railroad, built in 1860
- Tuskegee University, formerly known as the Tuskegee Institute, in Tuskegee, Alabama
- Tuskegee, English name for Tasquique, a Native American town in Apalachicola Province

== See also ==
- Taskigi Mound, a precolumbian archaeological site in central Alabama
- Tuckasegee (disambiguation)
