= Tuskegee (YTB-806) =

Tugboat of the United States Navy

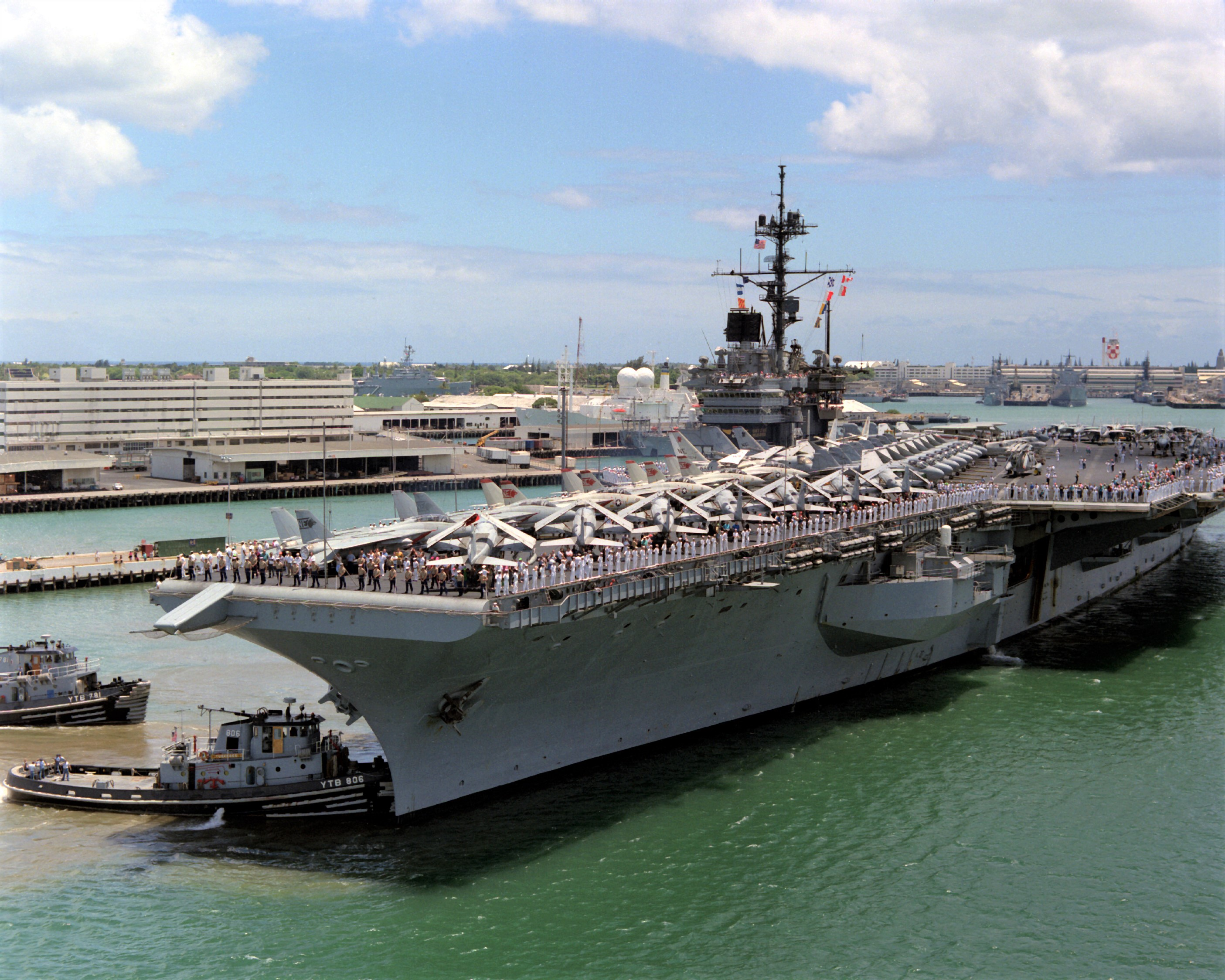
- Tuskegee (YTB-806) and Niantic (YTB-781) assist USS Ranger (CV-61) while docking at the Naval Supply Center pier at Naval Station Pearl Harbor, HI., 1 June 1991.

History

United States
- Awarded: 4 March 1969
- Builder: Peterson Builders, Sturgeon Bay, WI
- Laid down: 25 September 1969
- Launched: 15 April 1970
- In service: 2 October 1970
- Stricken: 26 April 2006
- Fate: Sold 11 February 2008

General characteristics
- Class & type: Natick-class large harbor tug
- Displacement: 282 long tons (287 t) (light); 341 long tons (346 t) (full)
- Length: 109 ft (33 m)
- Beam: 31 ft (9.4 m)
- Draft: 14 ft (4.3 m)
- Speed: 12 knots (14 mph; 22 km/h)
- Complement: 12
- Armament: None

Tuskegee (YTB-806) was a United States Navy Natick-class large harbor tug named for Tuskegee, Alabama.

== Construction ==
The contract for Tuskegee was awarded 4 March 1969. She was laid down on 25 September 1969 at Sturgeon Bay, Wisconsin, by Peterson Builders and launched 15 April 1970.

== Operational history ==
Tuskegee served the 14th Naval District at Pearl Harbor, Hawaii for her entire career.

Stricken from the Navy List 26 April 2006, ex-Tuskegee was sold by Defense Reutilization and Marketing Service (DRMS) for reuse or conversion, 11 February 2008.
