= Mecosta (YTB-818) =

Tugboat of the United States Navy

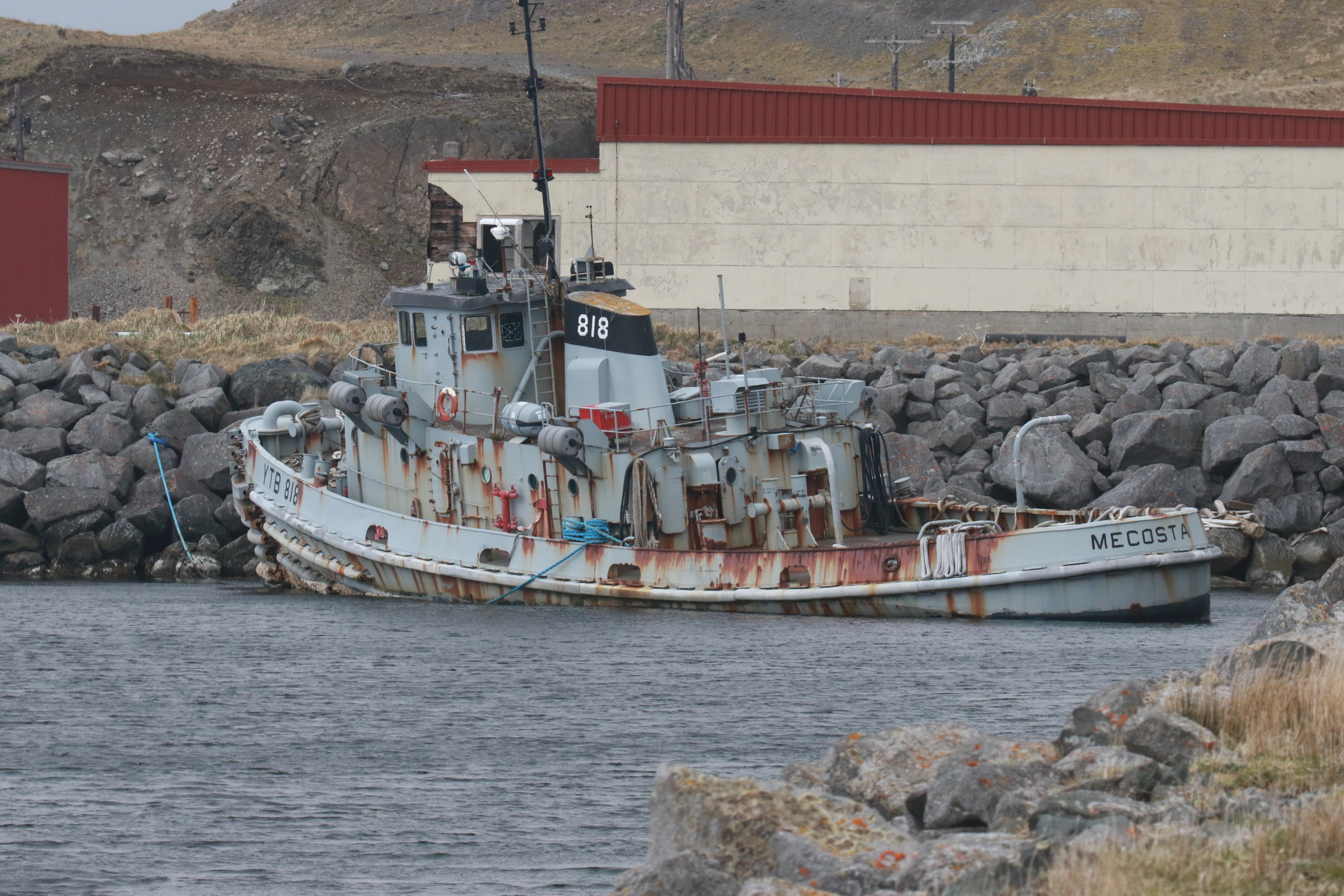
- Mecosta at Adak, Alaska in May 2016

History

United States
- Namesake: Mecosta, Michigan
- Awarded: 9 August 1971
- Builder: Marinette Marine
- Laid down: 16 August 1972
- Launched: 26 March 1973
- Acquired: 17 May 1973
- In service: 1973
- Out of service: 2003
- Stricken: 28 March 2003
- Fate: Transferred to Local Redevelopment Authority 17 March 2004

General characteristics
- Class & type: Natick-class large harbor tug
- Displacement: 286 long tons (291 t) (light); 346 long tons (352 t) (full)
- Length: 108 ft (33 m)
- Beam: 31 ft (9.4 m)
- Draft: 14 ft (4.3 m)
- Propulsion: One diesel propulsion engine, 2000 HP
- Speed: 12 knots (14 mph; 22 km/h)
- Complement: 12
- Armament: None
- Notes: Call sign NIMN

Mecosta (YTB-818) was a United States Navy Natick-class large harbor tug named for Mecosta, Michigan.

== Construction ==
The contract for Mecosta was awarded 9 August 1971. She was laid down on 16 August 1972 at Marinette, Wisconsin, by Marinette Marine and launched 26 March 1973. Her original cost was $800,000.

== Operational history ==
Her last posting was to Naval Station Adak.

In March 1975, Mecosta was in the Bering Sea near Atka with 28 people aboard when she lost power in a storm. The ship was in danger of drifting ashore and radioed for assistance. The U.S. Coast Guard Cutter Campbell responded, steaming 400 miles in 20 hours. She found Mecosta attended by another Navy tug, which had been unsuccessful in towing the drifting ship. Campbell, with heavier lines, was able to tow Mecosta to safety at Adak, where she arrived on March 27, 1975.

Stricken from the Navy List 28 March 2003, Mecosta was transferred to the Local Redevelopment Authority of Adak 17 March 2004. She remained moored at the former Naval Station for years.

In December 2015 Mecosta and her sister ship Redwing broke their mooring lines and went adrift in a storm. Redwing sank in the harbor, while Mecosta went aground in tidelands. Her owner had no money to take any action and by early 2017 Mecosta had capsized and lay on her port side in the mud.
