= Ottumwa (YTB-761) =

Tugboat of the United States Navy

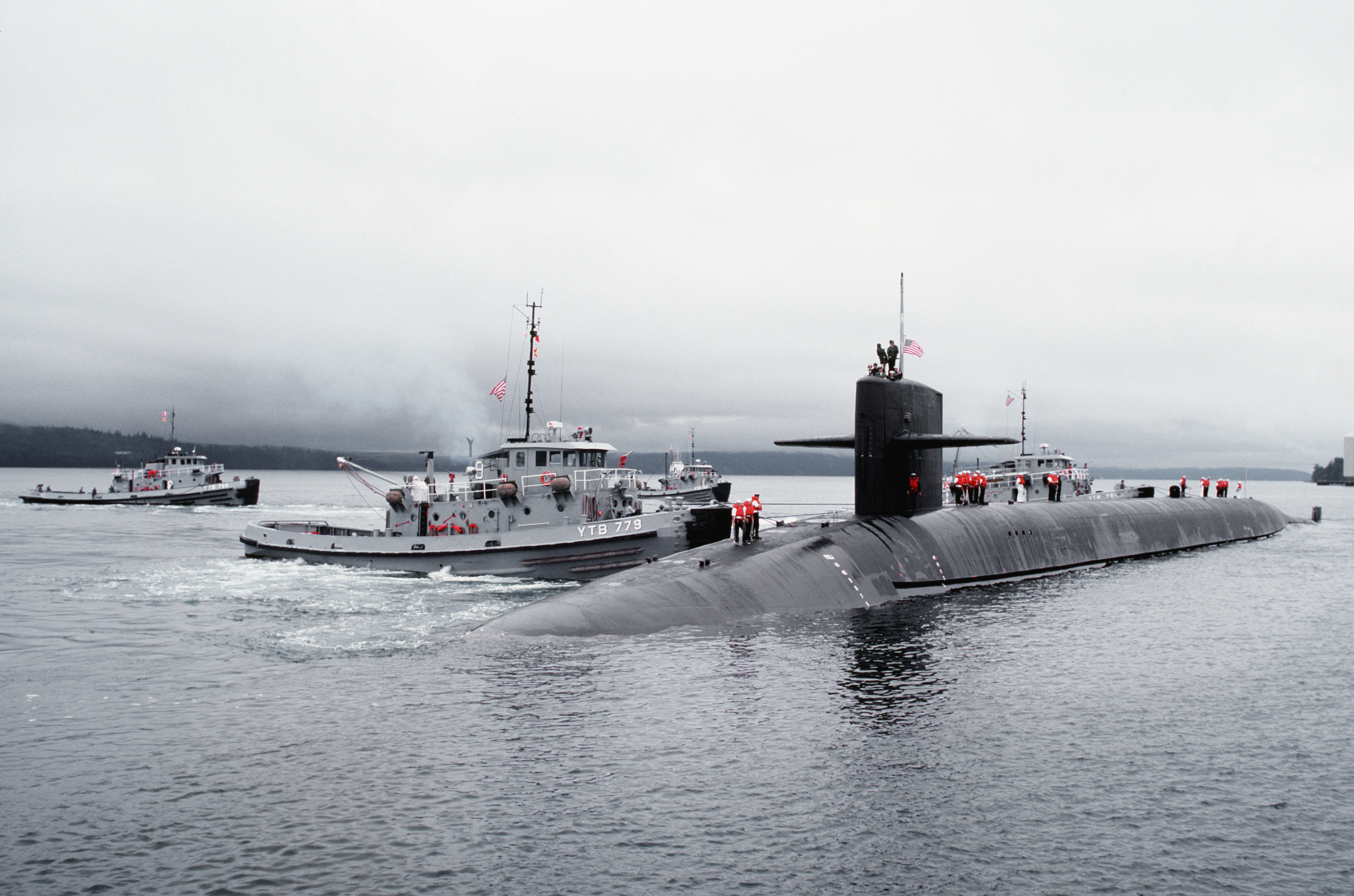
- Ottumwa and Manhattan (YTB-779) assist in the docking of the nuclear-powered ballistic missile submarine USS Ohio (SSGN-726) at Delta Pier, Naval Submarine Base Bangor, WA.

History

United States
- Awarded: 14 October 1960
- Laid down: 27 December 1960
- Launched: 30 May 1961
- In service: 9 October 1961
- Stricken: 28 October 2002
- Identification: MMSI number: 367413350; Callsign: WDE9094
- Fate: Sold into civilian service

General characteristics
- Class & type: Natick-class large harbor tug
- Displacement: 282 long tons (287 t) (light); 344 long tons (350 t) (full)
- Length: 109 ft (33 m)
- Beam: 29 ft 7 in (9.02 m)
- Draft: 14 ft (4.3 m)
- Propulsion: diesel, single screw
- Speed: 12 knots (14 mph; 22 km/h)
- Complement: 12

Ottumwa (YTB–761) was a United States Navy Natick-class large harbor tug named for Ottumwa, Iowa.

== Construction ==
The contract for Ottumwa was awarded 14 October 1960. She was laid down on 27 December 1960 at Jakobson Shipyard, Oyster Bay, New York and launched 30 May 1961.

== Operational history ==
First assigned duty in the 14th Naval District, she took up and ably performed the vast array of tasks appropriate to tugs at Pearl Harbor. She continued active service at Pearl Harbor into 1970. Sometime before decommissioning, Ottumwa was transferred to Naval Submarine Base Bangor, Washington.

Stricken from the Navy Directory 28 October 2002, she was transferred to the General Services Administration (GSA) under the Property Donation Exchange Program, 8 July 2004. Since then, ex-Ottumwa has been extensively modified and now serves as the commercial tug Holly Ann in the Puget Sound area.
