= Winnemucca (YTB-785) =

Tugboat of the United States Navy

History

United States
- Builder: Marinette Marine, Marinette, Wisconsin
- Laid down: 23 September 1965
- Launched: 23 December 1965
- Acquired: 5 April 1966
- In service: June 1966
- Stricken: 20 December 1995
- Identification: IMO number: 9089231; MMSI number: 367119940; Callsign: WDD2788
- Fate: Sold, 21 January 2004
- Status: Active as civilian tug Nanook

General characteristics
- Class & type: Natick-class large harbor tug
- Displacement: 283 long tons (288 t) (light); 356 long tons (362 t) (full)
- Length: 109 ft (33 m)
- Beam: 31 ft (9.4 m)
- Draft: 14 ft (4.3 m)
- Speed: 12 knots (22 km/h; 14 mph)
- Complement: 12
- Armament: None

Winnemucca (YTB-785) was a United States Navy Natick-class large harbor tug named for Winnemucca, Nevada. She was the second navy ship to bear the name.

== Construction ==
The contract for Winnemucca was awarded 31 January 1964. She was laid down on 23 September 1965 at Marinette, Wisconsin, by Marinette Marine and launched 23 December 1965.

== Operational history ==
Winnemucca was initially assigned to the 5th Naval District and operated in the Norfolk, Virginia area until the following spring. Reassigned at that time to Vietnam, she arrived in that country on 10 June 1967 and, for the remainder of America's involvement in the Vietnam War, she served with Task Force 117, the Mobile Riverine Force. During her almost six years of combat operations on the rivers and in the swamps of South Vietnam, Winnemucca earned two Presidential Unit Citations, four Navy Unit Commendations, and 13 campaign stars.

In 1973, she was reassigned to the 17th Naval District and operated out of Adak, Alaska. That tour of duty ended late in 1975 when she began service at San Francisco, attached to the 12th Naval District.

Stricken from the Navy List 22 December 2003, she was sold, 21 January 2004, by Defense Reutilization and Marketing Service (DRMS) for reuse/conversion to LMW Investments Inc. Chula Vista, CA. for $67,822. Converted to civilian use, ex-Winnemucca was renamed Noelani and provided tug services from San Francisco, California.

As of February 2024 she was sold to 41 North Offshore and renamed "Nanook" now operating out of New Bedford, Massachusetts.
