= Niantic =

Niantic may refer to:

- Niantic people, tribe of American Indians
- Niantic, Inc., mobile app developer known for the mobile games Ingress and formerly Pokémon Go
  - Niantic Spatial, spun-out company from Niantic
- Niantic Correctional Institution, now known as York Correctional Institution

== Ships ==
- Niantic (YTB-781)
- Niantic (whaling vessel), relic of San Francisco Gold Rush
- USS Niantic Victory, Victory ship later renamed USNS Watertown
- USS Niantic, US aircraft carrier later renamed HMS Ranee

== Places ==
- Niantic, Connecticut
  - Niantic River
- Niantic, Illinois
