= Tuckasegee =

Tuckasegee may refer to:

- Tuckasegee River, tributary of the Little Tennessee River in western North Carolina
- Tuckasegee, North Carolina, unincorporated community in Jackson County

== See also ==
- Tuckasegee darter, a species of darter fish
- Tuskegee (disambiguation)
