= Kalispell (YTB-784) =

Tugboat of the United States Navy

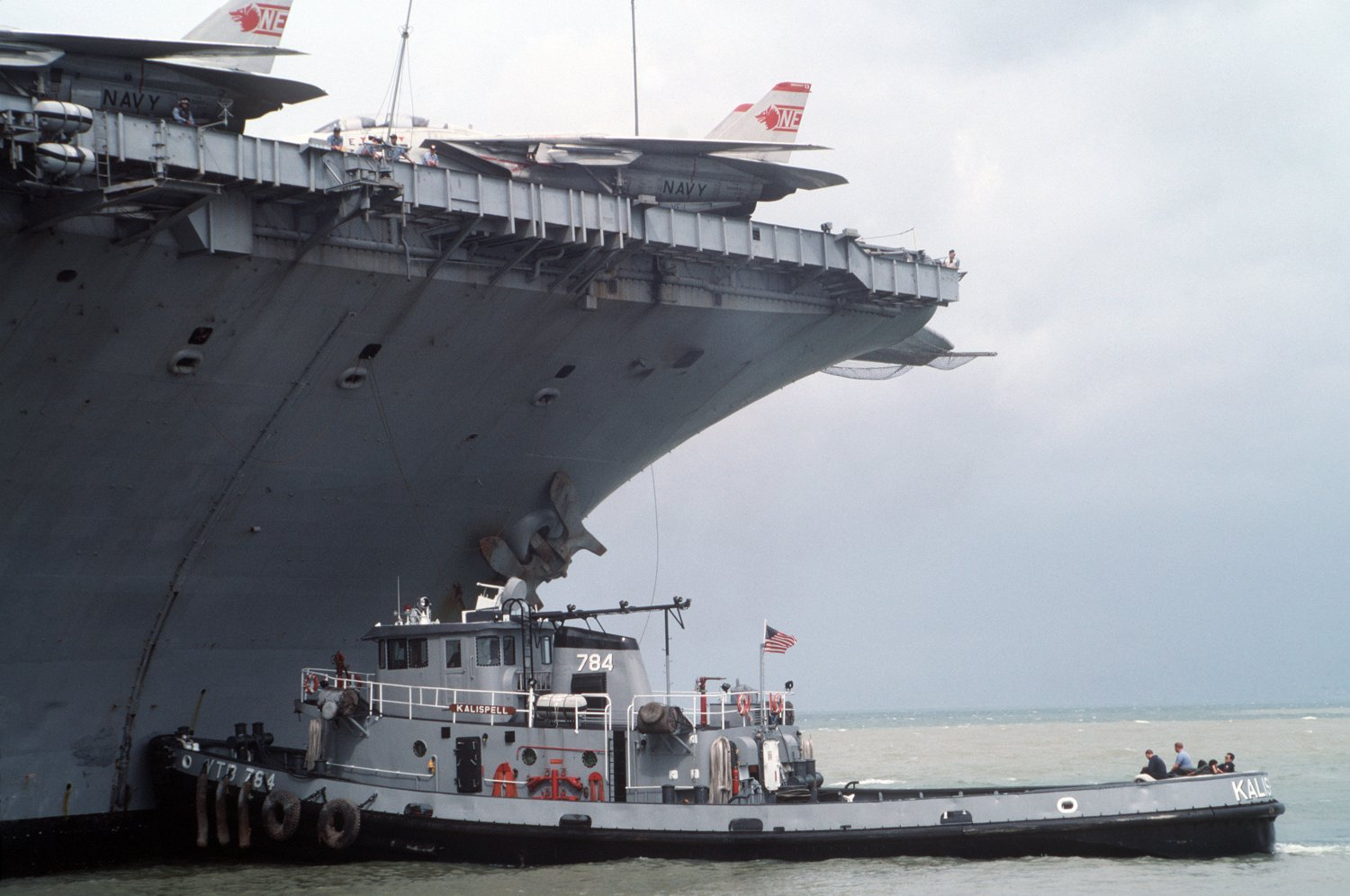
- Kalispell (YTB-784) pushes against the bow of the aircraft carrier USS Ranger (CV-61) as she guides the carrier into her berth.

History

United States
- Ordered: 14 January 1965
- Builder: Marinette Marine, Marinette, Wisconsin
- Laid down: 14 September 1965
- Launched: 13 December 1965
- Completed: 23 November 1965
- Acquired: 4 May 1966
- Stricken: 16 February 2002
- Fate: Scrapped, 9 May 2005

General characteristics
- Class & type: Natick-class large harbor tug
- Displacement: 283 long tons (288 t) (light); 356 long tons (362 t) (full)
- Length: 109 ft (33 m)
- Beam: 31 ft (9.4 m)
- Draft: 14 ft (4.3 m)
- Speed: 12 knots (14 mph; 22 km/h)
- Complement: 12
- Armament: None

Kalispell (YTB-784) was a United States Navy Natick-class large harbor tug named after Kalispell, Montana.

== Construction ==
The contract for Kalispell was awarded on 14 January 1965. She was laid down on 14 September 1965 at Marinette, Wisconsin, by Marinette Marine and launched 13 December 1965.

== Operational history ==
Placed in service 3 May 1966, Kalispell served in the 5th Naval District at Norfolk, Virginia until the Vietnam War when she was reassigned to Task Force 117, the Mobile Riverine Force and participated in many campaigns. After the war she served in Subic Bay, Republic of the Philippines and Diego Garcia before being scrapped in 2005. She earned eight campaign stars for Vietnam War service.
