= Manistee (YTB-782) =

US Navy tugboat

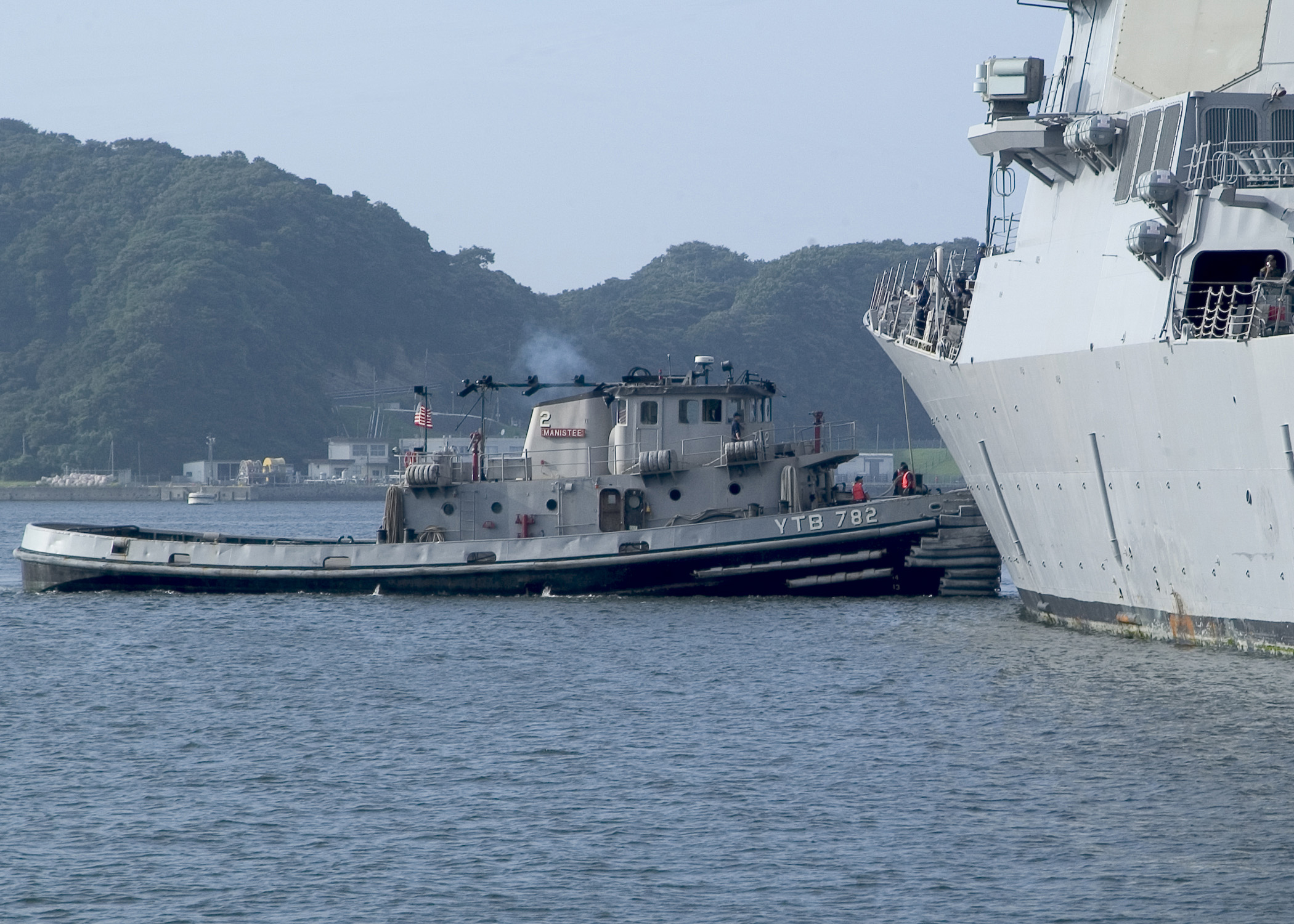
- Manistee assists the Arleigh Burke-class guided-missile destroyer USS Curtis Wilbur as she departs Fleet Activities Yokosuka, Japan on 1 August 2007.

History

United States
- Name: Manistee
- Ordered: 14 January 1965
- Builder: Marinette Marine, Marinette, Wisconsin
- Laid down: 9 August 1965
- Launched: 20 October 1965
- Completed: 23 November 1965
- Acquired: 1 February 1966
- In service: June 1966
- Stricken: 29 August 2012
- Status: Sold, departed Yokosuka 21 October 2015

General characteristics
- Class & type: Natick-class large harbor tug
- Displacement: 283 long tons (288 t) (light); 356 long tons (362 t) (full)
- Length: 109 ft (33 m)
- Beam: 31 ft (9.4 m)
- Draft: 14 ft (4.3 m)
- Propulsion: Diesel engine, single screw
- Speed: 12 knots (14 mph; 22 km/h)
- Complement: 12

Manistee (YTB‑782) is a United States Navy Natick-class large harbor tug named for Manistee, Michigan. She is the second tug to bear the name.

== Construction ==
The contract for Manistee was awarded 14 January 1965. She was laid down on 9 August 1965 at Marinette, Wisconsin, by Marinette Marine and launched 20 October 1965.

== Operational history ==
On 23 November 1965, Manistee, in company with another newly constructed tug, Redwing (YTB-783), departed the builder's yard for delivery to the Naval Station San Diego, California, where she was placed in service in June. Manistee, fitted with special fenders to allow work with the Navy's newer round-hulled nuclear power submarines, remained in the 11th Naval District, assisting larger Navy ships in docking and performing general towing services into the 1990s.

Sometime before 1999, Manistee was transferred to Naval Station Yokosuka, Japan where she remains in active status.
