= Mandan (YTB-794) =

Tugboat of the United States Navy

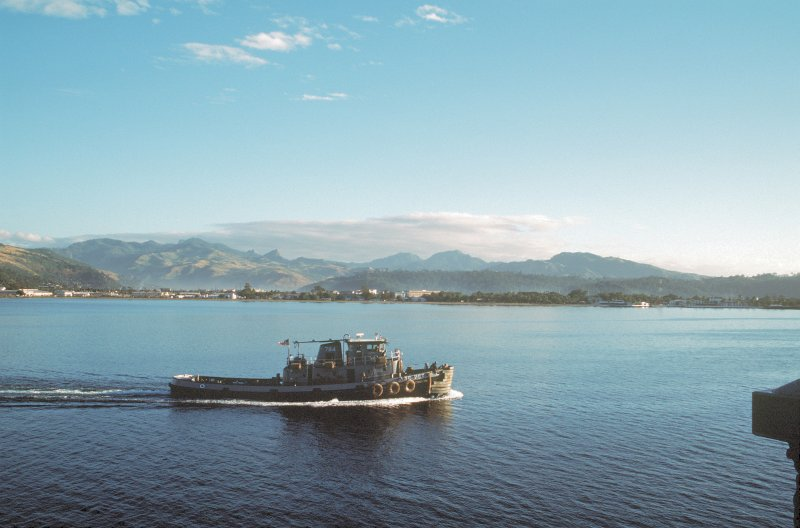
- Starboard broadside view of Mandan (YTB-794) underway in the harbor at Naval Station Subic Bay, Luzon, Philippines, 8 December 1990

History

United States
- Ordered: 15 June 1967
- Builder: Marinette Marine, Marinette, Wisconsin
- Laid down: 11 December 1967
- Launched: 30 April 1968
- Acquired: 15 October 1968
- Stricken: 5 January 2001
- Fate: Disposed of in support of fleet training exercise, 27 April 2003

General characteristics
- Class & type: Natick-class large harbor tug
- Displacement: 283 long tons (288 t) (light); 356 long tons (362 t) (full)
- Length: 109 ft (33 m)
- Beam: 31 ft (9.4 m)
- Draft: 14 ft (4.3 m)
- Speed: 12 knots (14 mph; 22 km/h)
- Complement: 12
- Armament: None

Mandan (YTB-794) was a United States Navy Natick-class large harbor tug named for Mandan, North Dakota.

== Construction ==
The contract for Mandan was awarded 15 June 1967. She was laid down on 11 December 1967 at Marinette, Wisconsin, by Marinette Marine and launched 30 April 1968.

== Operational history ==
Mandan served at Naval Station Subic Bay, Philippines until the Vietnam War when she was reassigned to Naval Support Activity Danang, South Vietnam. She earned campaign stars for Vietnamese Counteroffensive - Phase V, Vietnamese Counteroffensive - Phase VI, and Tet/69 Counteroffensive. After that conflict's conclusion, Mandan returned to Subic Bay where she served out the rest of her career.

Stricken from the Navy List 5 January 2001, ex-Mandan was sunk during fleet training exercises, 27 April 2003.
