= Ketchikan (YTB-795) =

Tugboat of the United States Navy

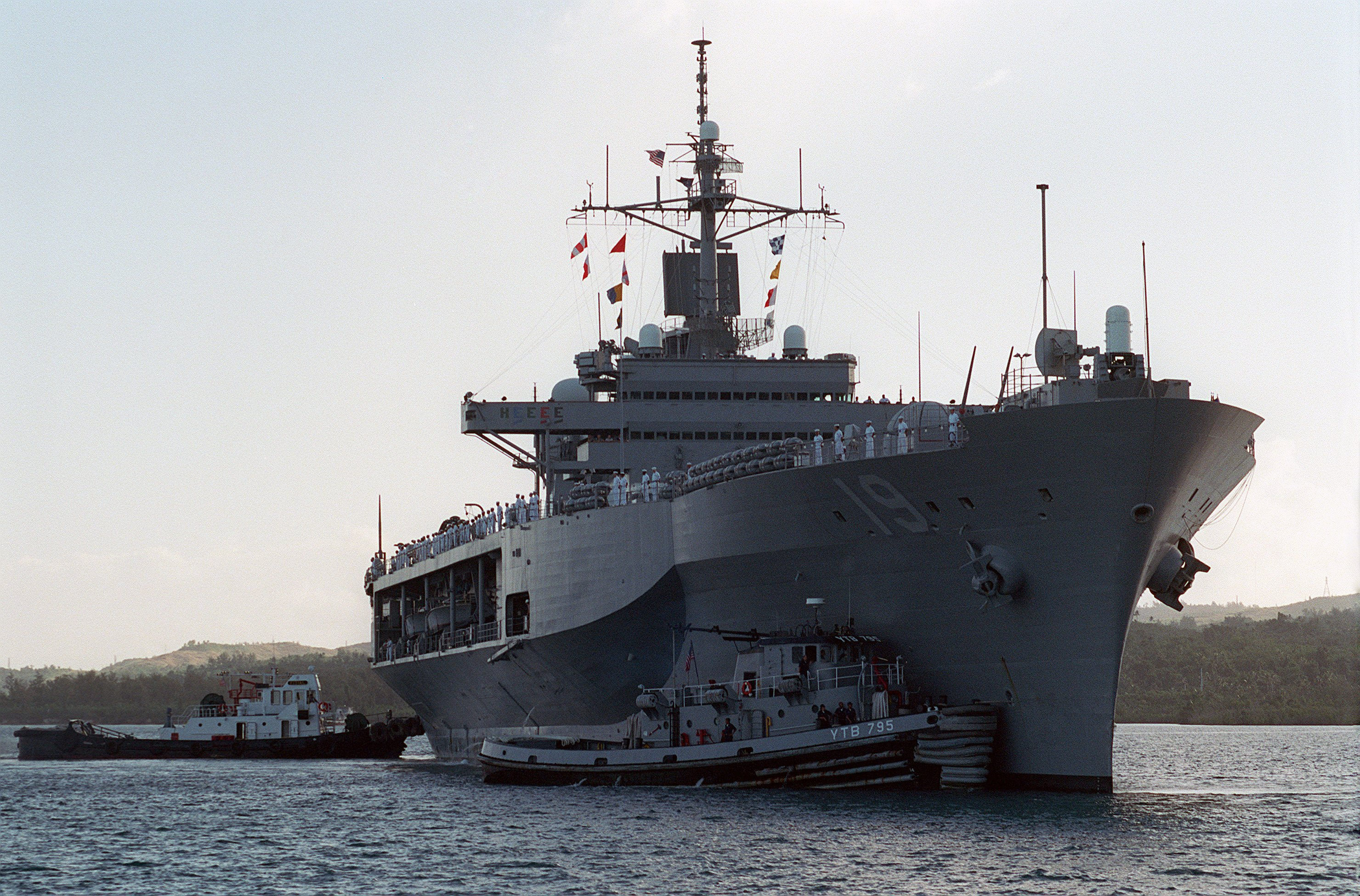
- A starboard bow view of USS Blue Ridge (LCC-19) being assisted by Ketchikan (YTB-795) and another tug, while docking at Sierra Pier, Naval Station Guam during Exercise TANDEM THRUST '99.

History

United States
- Ordered: 15 June 1967
- Builder: Marinette Marine, Marinette, Wisconsin
- Laid down: 18 December 1967
- Launched: 11 June 1968
- Acquired: 6 November 1968
- Stricken: 5 June 2001
- Fate: Disposed of in support of fleet training exercise, 25 April 2003

General characteristics
- Class & type: Natick-class large harbor tug
- Displacement: 283 long tons (288 t) (light); 356 long tons (362 t) (full)
- Length: 109 ft (33 m)
- Beam: 31 ft (9.4 m)
- Draft: 14 ft (4.3 m)
- Speed: 12 knots (14 mph; 22 km/h)
- Complement: 12
- Armament: None

Ketchikan (YTB-795) was a United States Navy Natick-class large harbor tug named for Ketchikan, Alaska.

== Construction ==
The contract for Ketchikan was awarded 15 June 1967. She was laid down on 18 December 1967 at Marinette, Wisconsin, by Marinette Marine and launched 11 June 1968.

== Operational history ==
Ketchikan served as a harbor tug at Naval Station Guam, Marianas Islands.

Stricken from the Navy List 5 June 2001, Ketchikan was sunk during fleet training exercises 25 April 2003.
