= Nogalesen =

US Navy Natick-class large harbor tug

History

United States
- Builder: Marinette Marine, Marinette, Wisconsin
- Laid down: 12 August 1964
- Launched: 24 June 1965
- Acquired: 22 October 1965
- Stricken: 13 March 2001
- Fate: Sunk as a target, 24 April 2003

General characteristics
- Class & type: Natick-class
- Type: Large District Harbor Tug
- Displacement: 356 tons
- Length: 109 ft (33 m)
- Beam: 31 ft (9.4 m)
- Draft: 14 ft (4.3 m)
- Propulsion: Diesel engine, single screw
- Speed: 12 knots (14 mph; 22 km/h)
- Complement: 12

Nogalesen (YTB–777)^{a} was a United States Navy Natick-class large harbor tug named for Nogales, Arizona.

== Construction ==
The contract for Nogalesen was awarded 31 January 1964. She was laid down on 12 August 1964 at Marinette, Wisconsin., by Marinette Marine and launched 24 June 1965.

== Operational history ==
Upon completion late in July 1965, Nogalesen left the Great Lakes via the St. Lawrence Seaway for delivery to the Navy at Pearl Harbor. Placed in service 22 October she soon steamed for duty in the western Pacific. Equipped with firefighting equipment and designed to work alongside every ship in the fleet, Nogalesen assisted the Pacific Fleet from her homeport at Naval Station, Guam.

Stricked from the Navy List 13 March 2001, Nogalesen was disposed of in support of a fleet training exercise, 26 April 2003.

== Notes ==
^a Sources disagree on YTB-777's name. According to the NVR and NavSource, she is Nogalesen. Navysite.de and DANFS list her as Nogales. The Natick-class tugboats are named for towns, often derived from native American words. Nogales is a town in Arizona; Nogalesen is not.
