= Santaquin (YTB-824) =

Tugboat of the United States Navy

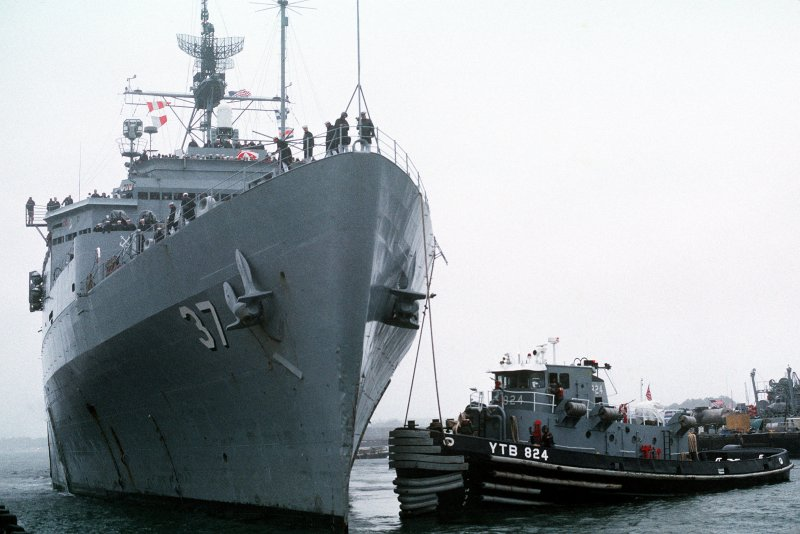
- Santaquin (YTB-824) assists the dock landing ship USS Portland (LSD-37) into her berth at Naval Amphibious Base, Little Creek, VA., 20 April 1991.

History

United States
- Awarded: 9 August 1971
- Builder: Marinette Marine, Marinette, Wisconsin
- Laid down: 5 March 1973
- Launched: 13 August 1973
- Acquired: 30 September 1973
- Status: Active

General characteristics
- Class & type: Natick-class large harbor tug
- Displacement: 286 long tons (291 t) (light); 346 long tons (352 t) (full)
- Length: 108 ft (33 m)
- Beam: 31 ft (9.4 m)
- Draft: 14 ft (4.3 m)
- Speed: 12 knots (14 mph; 22 km/h)
- Complement: 12
- Armament: None

Santaquin (YTB-824) is a United States Navy Natick-class large harbor tug named for Santaquin, Utah.

== Construction ==
The contract for Santaquin was awarded 9 August 1971. She was laid down on 5 March 1973 at Marinette, Wisconsin, by Marinette Marine and launched 13 August 1973.^{a}

== Operational history ==
Sometime prior to 1991, Santaquin served in the Norfolk, Virginia area.

Sometime prior to 2009, Santaquin was reassigned to Naval Station Guantanamo Bay where she remains in active service.

== Notes ==
^a The NVR and DANFS sources seem to disagree on construction dates. In keeping with other articles in this class, dates shown are those taken from the NVR.
