= George Stetter =

American gridiron football player (born 1945)

Profile
- Position: Defensive back

Personal information
- Born: April 29, 1945 (age 81); Neptune, New Jersey, U.S.
- Listed height: 5 ft 11 in (1.80 m)
- Listed weight: 180 lb (82 kg)

Career information
- College: Virginia

Career history
- 1967: Ottawa Rough Riders
- 1968: Montreal Alouettes

Awards and highlights
- Grey Cup champion (1968)

George Stetter (born April 29, 1945) is an American former professional football player who played for the Montreal Alouettes and Ottawa Rough Riders. He won the Grey Cup in 1968 with Ottawa. He previously played college football at the University of Virginia.

Raised in the Wanamassa section of Ocean Township, Monmouth County, New Jersey, Stetter played prep football at Asbury Park High School.
