= Wanamassa (Native American) =

Wanamassa was a Native American chief of the 17th century.

== Honors ==
- The town of Wanamassa, New Jersey is named after Wanamassa.
- The United States Navy large harbor tug USS Wanamassa (YTB-820), in commission since 1973, is named after him.
