= Redwing (YTB-783) =

Tugboat of the United States Navy

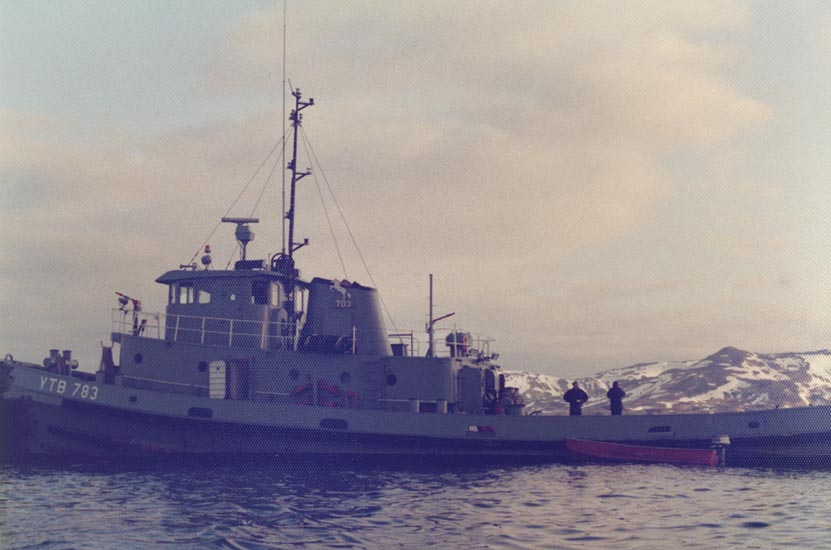
- Redwing in Atka harbor, Aleutian Islands, Alaska, 1976

History

United States
- Ordered: 14 January 1965
- Builder: Marinette Marine, Marinette, Wisconsin
- Laid down: 9 August 1965
- Launched: 20 October 1965
- Acquired: 1 February 1966
- Stricken: 28 March 2003
- Fate: Transferred to the Local Redevelopment Authority 17 March 2004

General characteristics
- Class & type: Natick-class large harbor tug
- Displacement: 283 long tons (288 t) (light); 356 long tons (362 t) (full)
- Length: 109 ft (33 m)
- Beam: 31 ft (9.4 m)
- Draft: 14 ft (4.3 m)
- Speed: 12 knots (14 mph; 22 km/h)
- Complement: 12
- Armament: None

Redwing (YTB-783) was a United States Navy Natick-class large harbor tug named for the Redwing songbird.

== Construction ==
The contract for Redwing was awarded 31 January 1964. She was laid down on 9 August 1965 at Marinette, Wisconsin, by Marinette Marine and launched 20 October 1965.

== Operational history ==
On 23 November 1965 Redwing, in company with Manistee (YTB-782), another newly constructed tug, departed the builder's yard for delivery to the Naval Station San Diego, California.

Placed in service in June 1965, Redwing, was fitted with special fenders to allow her to work with the United States Navy's round-hulled nuclear-powered submarines, operated in the 11th and 12th Naval Districts, assisting larger Navy ships in docking and performing general towing services.

Beginning in 1969, Redwing was assigned to Adak Army Base and Adak Naval Operating Base, Adak, Alaska, operating in rough North Pacific waters. Along with the Mecosta (YTB-818), duties included assisting in docking operations, search and rescue operations in some of the roughest water in the world, research trips, transportation around the island and to other islands in the Aleutian chain, and any other odd jobs that came along. As the only two work boats assigned to the Cold War base on Adak, they were kept very busy.

Stricken from the Navy Directory on 28 March 2003, Redwing was transferred to the Local Redevelopment Authority 17 March 2004.
