= Manhattan (YTB-779) =

Tugboat of the United States Navy

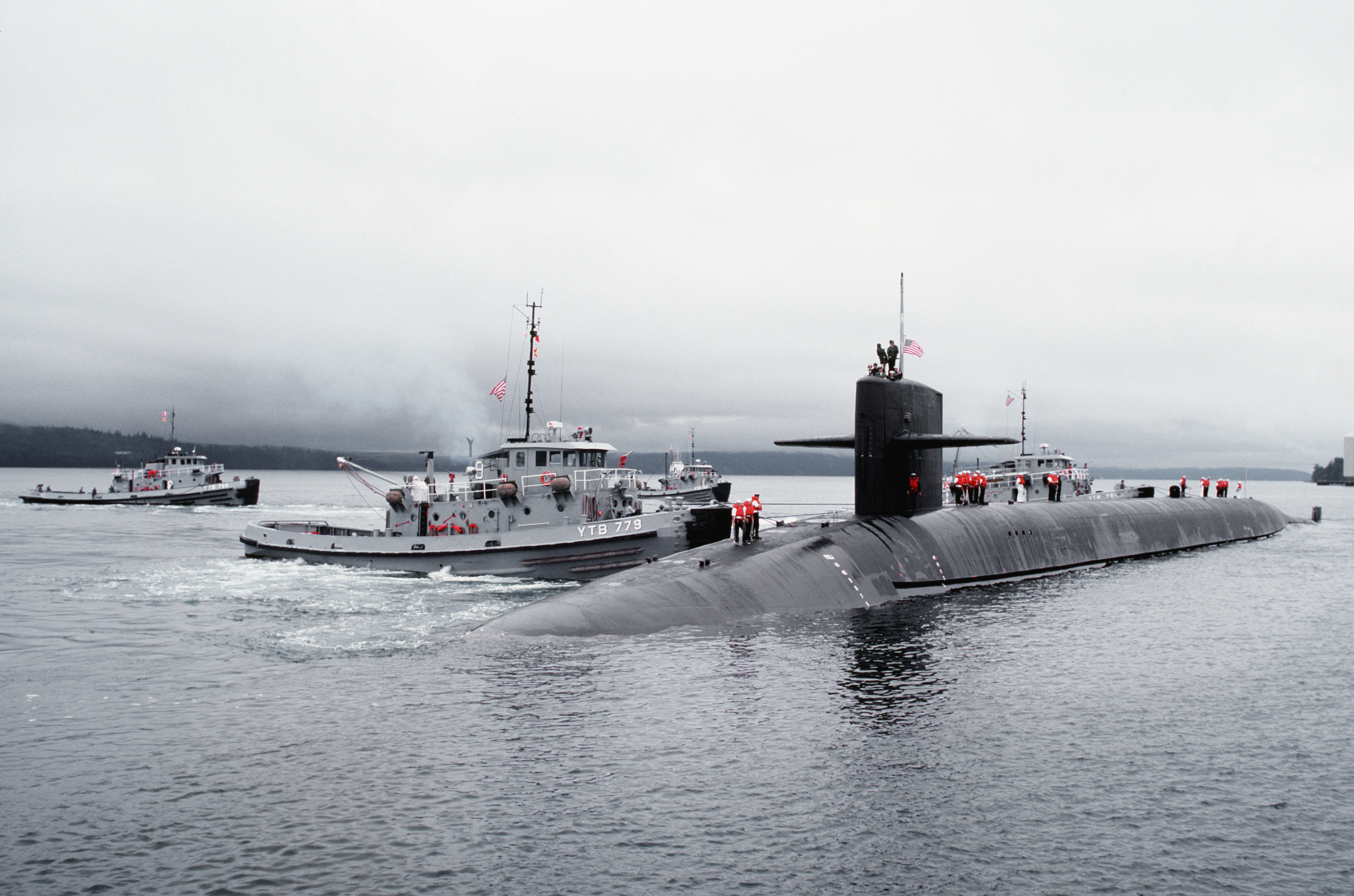
- USS Ottumwa (YTB-761) and Manhattan (YTB-779) assist in the docking of the nuclear-powered strategic missile submarine USS Ohio (SSGN-726) at Delta Pier, Naval Submarine Base Bangor, Washington.

History

United States
- Ordered: 31 January 1964
- Builder: Marinette Marine, Marinette, Wisconsin
- Laid down: 1 October 1964
- Launched: 15 July 1965
- Acquired: 1 December 1965
- Reclassified: Yard tug, YT-800, 7 October 2008
- Stricken: 1 October 2004
- Reinstated: 7 October 2008
- Status: Active

General characteristics
- Class & type: Natick-class large harbor tug
- Displacement: 283 long tons (288 t) (lt); 356 long tons (362 t) (full)
- Length: 109 ft (33 m)
- Beam: 31 ft (9.4 m)
- Draft: 14 ft (4.3 m)
- Propulsion: 2 x Caterpillar 3516B diesel engines; Twin z-drive, 2008
- Speed: 12 knots (22 km/h; 14 mph)
- Complement: 12

Manhattan (YTB‑779/YT-800) is a United States Navy Natick-class large harbor tug named for Manhattan, New York.

== Construction ==
The contract for Manhattan was awarded 31 January 1964. She was laid down on 1 October 1964 at Marinette, Wisconsin, by Marinette Marine and launched 15 July 1965.

== Operational history ==
Assigned to the Pacific Fleet, Manhattan transited the Panama Canal and steamed to Hawaii for duty in the US Naval Shipyard at Pearl Harbor.

Manhattan served in Viet Nam between November 1966 and September 1968.

After Viet Nam, Manhattan was assigned to Naval Submarine Base Bangor.

Stricken from the Navy Directory 1 October 2004, Manhattan was sold by the Defense Reutilization and Marketing Service (DRMS), 23 August 2005, to Grant Westmoreland, LMW Investments Inc. for $151,888.

Ex-Manhattan was repowered and converted to twin z-drive and reacquired by the US Navy, 7 October 2008 and was designated as USS Manhattan yard tug YT-800. (Note: The NVR notes that Manhattan was reacquired by the Navy and designated YT-800 without a name. Other evidence shows that Manhattan has recovered her name and, but not the YTB hull classification, at least her old hull number.)

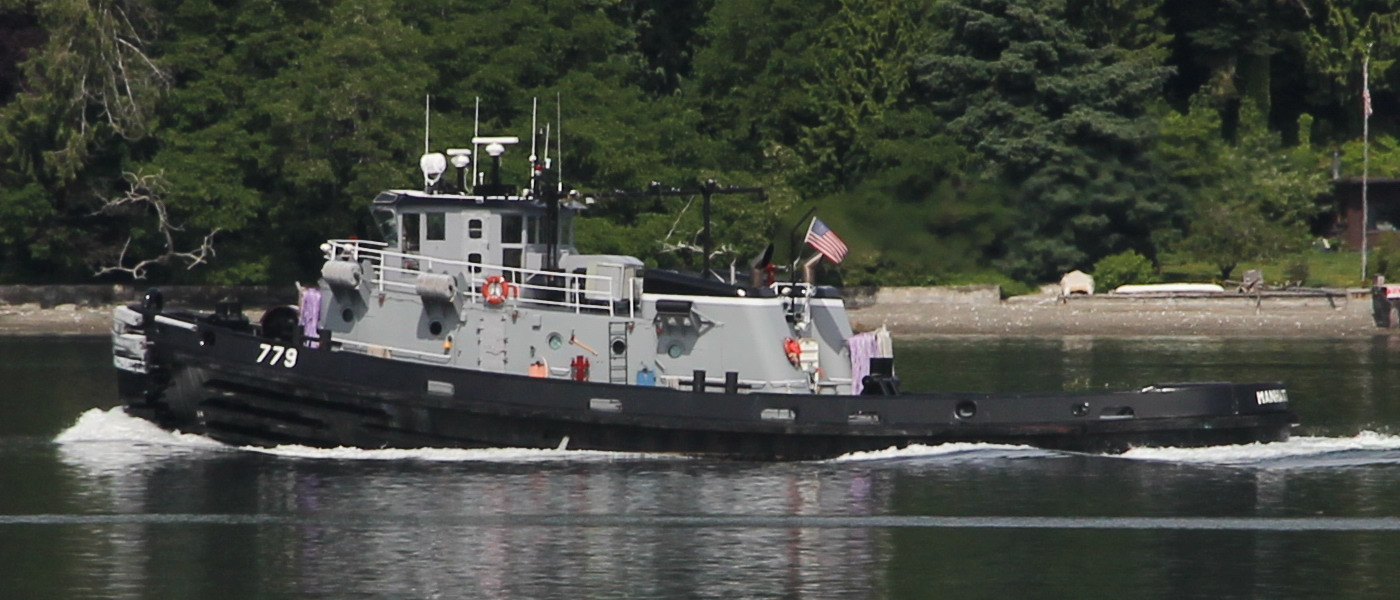
Manhattan (779) returning to Bremerton 2012
