= Omani ship Nasr al Bahr =

Omani amphibious warfare vessel

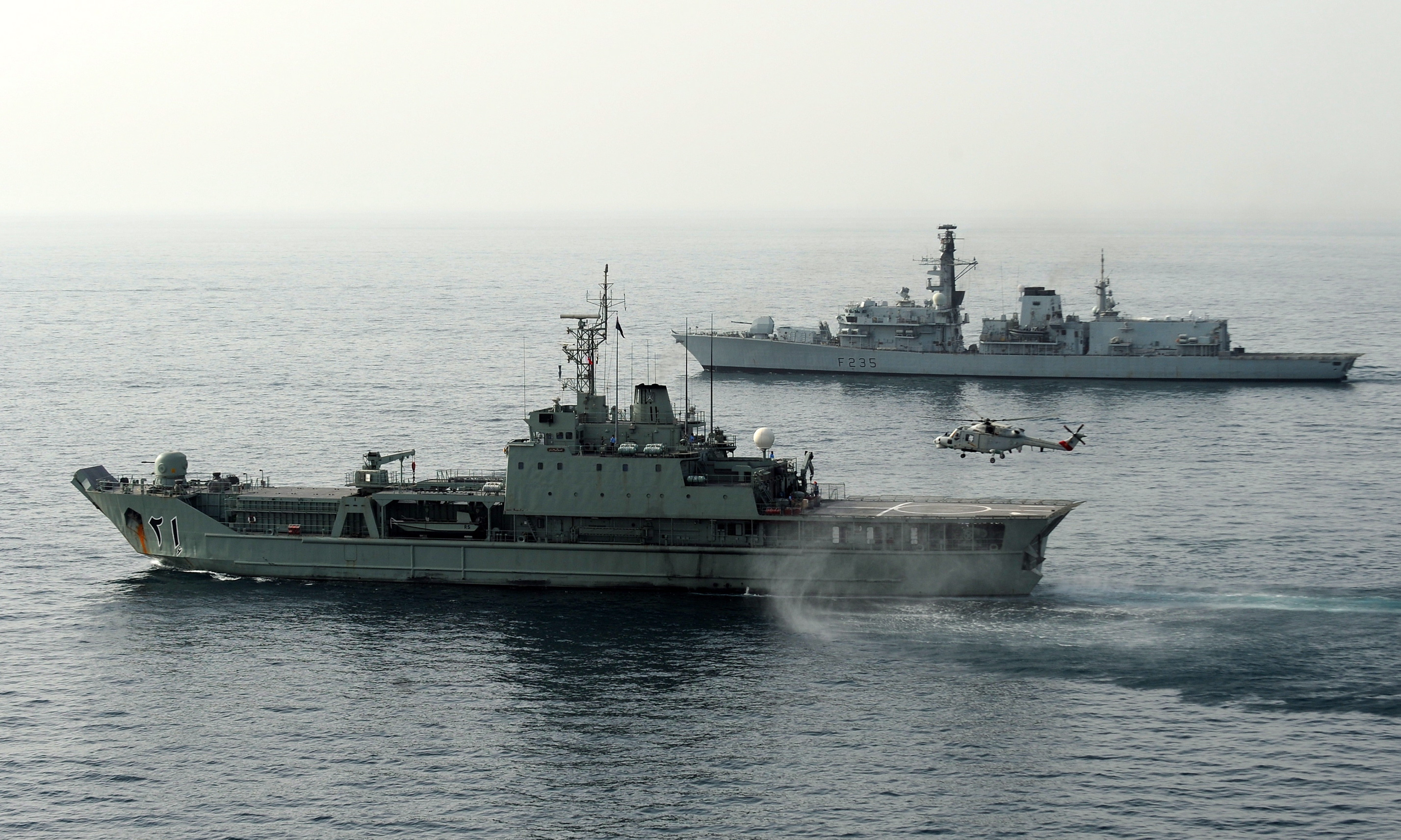
- Nasr al Bahr, in the foreground, operating with HMS Monmouth in 2011

History

Oman
- Name: Nasr al Bahr
- Ordered: 18 March 1982
- Builder: Brooke Marine, Lowestoft
- Laid down: May 1982
- Launched: 16 May 1984
- Commissioned: 13 February 1985

General characteristics
- Class & type: Brooke Marine 93 m amphibious warfare ship
- Displacement: 2,500 t (2,500 long tons) (full)
- Length: 93 m (305 ft 1 in)
- Beam: 15.5 m (50 ft 10 in)
- Draft: 2.3 m (7 ft 7 in)
- Installed power: 7,800 bhp (5,800 kW)
- Propulsion: Two Paxman Valenta diesel engines, two shafts
- Speed: 16 knots (30 km/h)
- Range: 4,000 nautical miles (7,400 km) at 13 knots (24 km/h)
- Complement: 84
- Sensors & processing systems: Decca TM 1226 sea search and navigational radar; Decca 1290 navigational radar; Erricson 9LV fire control radar; Kelvin Hughes MS 45 echo sounder
- Armament: 2 × twin Bofors 40 mm (1.6 in) anti-aircraft guns; 2 × single Oerlikon 20 mm (0.79 in) cannons
- Aviation facilities: Facilities for 1 helicopter up to a Westland Sea King

Nasr al Bahr is an amphibious warfare vessel operated by the Royal Navy of Oman. She is larger and more capable than its predecessor, Al Munassir, with the capacity to carry up to 650 t (640 long tons; 720 short tons) of cargo, seven main battle tanks, or 240 troops. It is equipped with a large bow ramp, allowing vehicles to be disembarked at steep angles. The vessel's armament includes two twin 40 mm (1.6 in) guns designed to fire shells capable of intercepting anti-ship missiles.

Nasr al Bahr was launched in 1985 and underwent an upgrade in 1992, which included the addition of a traditional funnel. However, a more extensive modernization attempt in 1995 was unsuccessful. The ship has participated in joint exercises with the navies of other countries, including Exercise Saif Sareea, and provided humanitarian aid to the Musandam Governorate during the COVID-19 pandemic.

== Design and development ==
The Royal Omani Navy, officially known as the Sultan of Oman's Navy until June 1990, is responsible for securing the strategically important Strait of Hormuz and protecting the nation's 370 km (230 mi) coastline. Unusually for the region, the navy possesses amphibious warfare capabilities. Nasr al Bahr is the second large amphibious warfare ship operated by the navy and was ordered from Brooke Marine as a complement to the smaller Al Munassir, which was already in service. The design is similar to the Kalaat Beni Hammed class vessels ordered by the Algerian National Navy, and the ships are sometimes considered part of the same class, although they differ in aspects such as propulsion and sensors. Collectively, these vessels are known as the Brooke Marine 93 m amphibious warfare ships.

Nasr al Bahr displaces 2,500 metric tons (2,500 long tons; 2,800 short tons) and has an overall length of 93 m (305 ft 1 in) and 80 m (262 ft 6 in) between perpendiculars. The beam is 15.5 m (50 ft 10 in), and the mean draught is 2.3 m (7.5 ft). The ship's complement comprises 13 officers, 16 chief petty officers, and 52 enlisted personnel.

The vessel is powered by two Paxman Valenta 18RP200CM diesel engines, driving two constant-pitch propellers. These engines produce a combined output of 7,800 bhp (5,800 kW), giving the ship a top speed of 15.5 knots (29 km/h; 18 mph) and a cruising range of 4,000 nautical miles (7,400 km) at 13 knots (24 km/h; 15 mph). The vessel has an endurance of 28 days, reduced to 10 days when carrying troops. Upon entering service, the ship experienced issues with its exhaust system, which initially expelled gases underwater. A solution was implemented in 1992 with the addition of a traditional funnel. Auxiliary power is provided by three diesel engines generating a combined 180 kW (240 hp).

The vessel was originally designed to transport up to 380 t (370 long tons; 420 short tons) of cargo or seven main battle tanks, along with a number of landing craft. This capacity was later increased to a maximum of 450 t (440 long tons; 500 short tons) of beachable cargo, and up to 650 t (640 long tons; 720 short tons) of non-beachable cargo. The vessel can carry a landing force composed of 13 officers, 16 non-commissioned officers, and 211 enlisted troops. The vehicle deck measures 76 m (249 ft) in length and 7.4 m (24 ft) in width, and is equipped with a cargo hatch measuring 30 m (98 ft) by 7 m (23 ft). Disembarkation is facilitated by a bow ramp measuring 18 m (59 ft) by 4.5 m (15 ft) wide and a stern ramp measuring 5 m (16 ft) by 4 m (13 ft). Vehicles can be landed on gradients of up to 1:40. A 16 t (16 long tons; 18 short tons) crane is mounted forward and can traverse to unload the cargo deck. The ship also carries two Sea Truck landing craft.

=== Armament and sensors ===
Nasr al Bahr is equipped with a gun-only armament suite, consisting of two twin Bofors 40 mm (1.6 in) L/70 guns in Breda DARDO mounts and two single Oerlikon 20 mm (0.79 in) cannons in GAM B01 mounts. The Bofors guns, also known as Compact Forty, can fire high-explosive (HE) shells at a rate of 600 rounds per minute with a muzzle velocity of 1,025 m (3,363 ft) per second. They are also capable of firing Armour-Piercing Fin-Stabilized Discarding Sabot (APFSDS) rounds at 1,350 m (4,430 ft) per second, intended for use against incoming anti-ship missiles. The Oerlikon cannons have a rate of fire of 1,000 rounds per minute and a muzzle velocity of 1,050 m (3,440 ft) per second. The vessel features a helipad aft, capable of accommodating a helicopter up to the size of a Westland Sea King.

For sensors, the ship is equipped with Decca TM 1226 sea search and navigational radar, and Decca 1290 navigation radar. Initially, a single CSEE Lynx electro-optical fire control system was installed, later supplemented by an Ericsson 9LV 200 fire control radar. Electronic support measures (ESM) are provided by the Decca RDL-2 radar detecting and locating system. A single Kelvin Hughes MS 45 echo sounder is also fitted. The ship is armed with two Wallop Barricade decoy launchers, for which Oman was the launch customer. Each launcher fires 57 mm (2.2 in) chaff and flare rockets.

== Construction and career ==
Ordered on 18 March 1982, Nasr al Bahr was laid down by Brooke Marine at their shipyard in Lowestoft in May of the same year. The vessel was launched on 16 May 1984 and commissioned into service with the Royal Navy of Oman on 13 February 1985. The ship carried the pennant number L.2.

One of the primary roles of the Royal Navy of Oman is to conduct joint exercises with foreign navies and participate in international port visits. As the largest vessel in the Omani fleet, Nasr al Bahr frequently takes part in combined naval operations. Notably, the ship participated in Exercise Saif Sareea, a large-scale military exercise between the United Kingdom and Oman, held from 15 November to 8 December 1986. The two nations have a long history of naval cooperation, with British officers serving in the Omani Navy. In 1990, the vessel visited Goa, India, as part of a broader Indian Ocean deployment aimed at showcasing the Royal Navy of Oman's capabilities abroad.

An attempt to modernize the ship's systems in 1995 was unsuccessful, although the aft Oerlikon mount was removed in 1996 to improve stability. Upon returning to active service, the ship initially spent more time in dock than at sea. However, a 2005 study found that Nasr al Bahr spent 52 days at sea that year—comparing favorably with the rest of the fleet, which recorded between 23 and 75 days at sea, excluding two outliers. Nasr al Bahr subsequently took part in Exercise Khanjar Haad on 10 May 2011, which involved joint operations with the French Navy, the United States Navy, and the Royal Navy.

In addition to its amphibious warfare role, Nasr al Bahr provides logistical support to Oman's remote territories. This includes transporting personnel and equipment to the strategically important Masirah Island, a site utilized by the United States Armed Forces as a staging post for operations in the Persian Gulf, and a major base for the Royal Air Force of Oman. In January 2021, during the COVID-19 pandemic, the ship delivered humanitarian aid—including fuel and other essential supplies—to Khasab in the Musandam Governorate. Fuel was transported in tankers carried in the ship's hold.

== Bibliography ==
- Abdul-Whahab, Sabah A. (2010). "Maritime Oil Transport and Pollution Prevention". In Kutz, Myer; Elkamel, Ali (eds.). Environmentally Conscious Fossil Energy Production. Hoboken NJ: Wiley. pp. 143–172. doi:10.1002/9780470432747.ch4. ISBN 978-0-47023-301-6.
- Cordesman, Anthony H. (1997). Bahrain, Oman, Qatar, and the UAE: Challenges of Security. Boulder CO: Westview Press. ISBN 978-0-81333-239-0.
- Couhat, Jean Labayle, ed. (1986). Combat Fleets of the World 1986/87. Annapolis, Maryland: Naval Institute Press. ISBN 978-0-85368-860-0.
- Cowin, Hugh W. (1986). Conway's Directory of Modern Naval Power 1986. London: Conway Maritime. ISBN 978-0-85177-362-9.
- Cowin, Hugh W. (1987). Warships. London: Frederick Warne. ISBN 978-0-72321-694-0.
- Daleel, Falah Ali (2023). "The Omani Military Establishment and Military Spending (1970-1991)". Central Asian Journal of Socal Scienes and History. 4 (12): 214–231. ISSN 2660-6836.
- Ehlers, Hartmut (1993). "The Royal Navy of Oman". Warship International. 30 (1): 59–71.
- Ehlers, Hartmut (2004). "Marynarka Wojenna Omanu" [Omani Navy]. Okręty Wojenne. 67 (5). Translated by Sobanski, Maciej S.: 48–54.
- Friedman, Norman (1997). The Naval Institute Guide to World Naval Weapons Systems, 1997–1998. Annapolis MD: Naval Institute Press. ISBN 978-1-55750-268-1.
- Fursdon, Edward (January 1987). "Exercise Saif Sareea". The Army Quarterly and Defence Journal. 117 (1): 44–47.
- Hiranandani, Gulab Mohanlal (2005). Transition to Eminence: History of the Indian Navy, 1976–1990. New Delhi: Lancer Publishers. ISBN 978-8-17062-266-6.
- Sharpe, Richard (1994). Jane's Fighting Ships, 1994–95. Coulsdon: Jane's Information Group. ISBN 978-0-71061-161-1.
- Śmigielski, Adam (1995). "Oman". In Chumbley, Stephen (ed.). Conway's All the World's Fighting Ships 1947–1995. Annapolis: Naval Institute Press. pp. 296–299. ISBN 978-1-55750-132-5.
- Wertheim, Eric (2005). The Naval Institute Guide to Combat Fleets of the World, 2005–2006: Their Ships, Aircraft, and Systems. Annapolis MD: Naval Institute Press. ISBN 978-1-59114-934-7.
