= Weehawken (YTB-776) =

Tugboat of the United States Navy

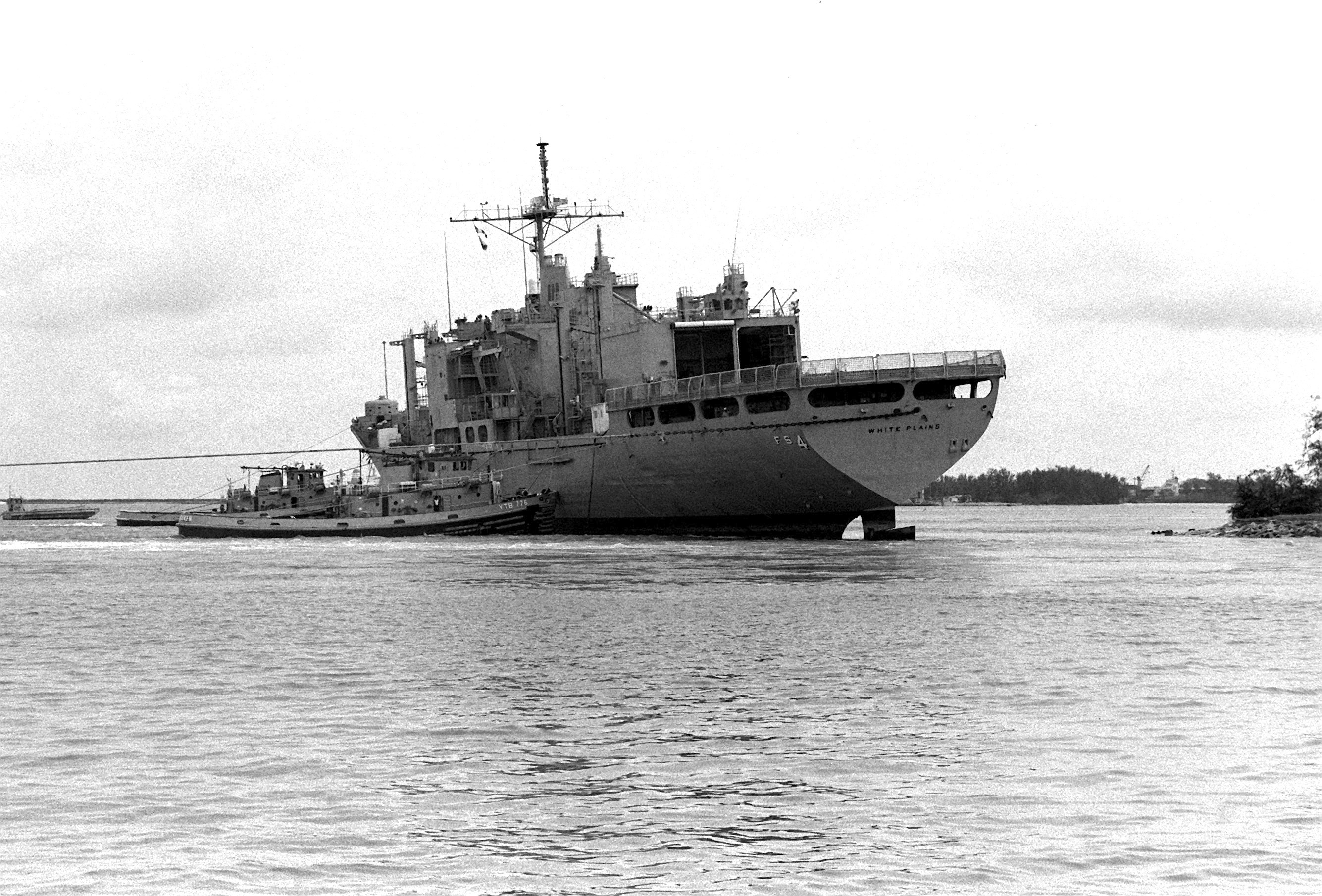
- Weehawken (YTB-776) pushes USS White Plains (AFS-4) back out to sea after a grounding

History

United States
- Namesake: Weehawken, New Jersey
- Awarded: 31 January 1964
- Builder: Marinette Marine, Marinette, Wisconsin
- Laid down: 13 August 1964
- Launched: 6 August 1965
- Acquired: 22 October 1965
- Decommissioned: 24 April 2003
- Stricken: 5 January 2001
- Fate: Disposed of in support of Fleet training exercise

General characteristics
- Class & type: Natick-class
- Type: Large District Harbor Tug
- Displacement: 283 tons
- Length: 109 feet (33 m)
- Beam: 31 feet (9.4 m)
- Draft: 14 feet (4.3 m)
- Speed: 12 knots (22 km/h; 14 mph)
- Complement: 12

Weehawken (YTB-776) was a United States Navy Natick-class large harbor tug named for Weehawken, New Jersey.

== Construction ==
The contract for Weehawken was awarded 31 January 1964. She was laid down on 13 August 1964 at Marinette, Wisconsin by Marinette Marine and launched 8 June 1965.

== Operational history ==
Weehawken was delivered to the 9th Naval District in July 1965. In November 1965, she was placed in service in the 14th Naval District, which comprises the Hawaiian Islands and surrounding smaller islets. She also served at Guam. The tug conducted routine towing operations between those islands and rendered assistance to ships entering and clearing Pearl Harbor. As of December 1979, she was still active in the 14th Naval District.

Stricken from the Navy List 5 January 2001, Weehawken was disposed of during a fleet training exercise on 24 April 2003 after 37.5 years of commissioned service.
