= Omani ship Al Munassir =

Amphibious warfare vessel operated by the Royal Navy of Oman

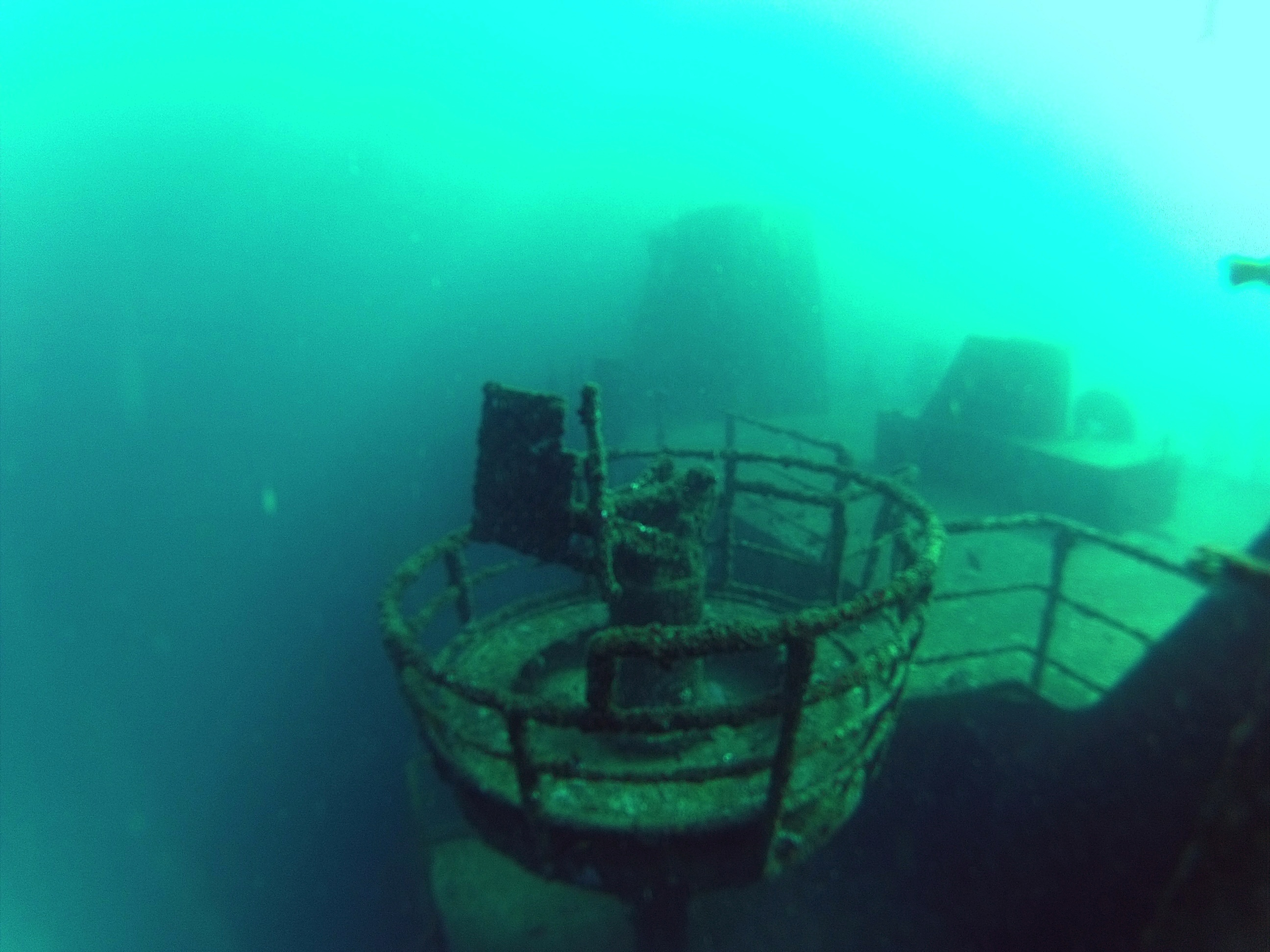
- Remains of an Oerlikon gun mount on the sunken Al Munassir

History

Oman
- Name: Al Munassir
- Builder: Brooke Marine, Lowestoft
- Laid down: 4 July 1977
- Launched: 25 July 1978
- Commissioned: 31 January 1979
- Fate: Sunk as an artificial reef 22 April 2003

General characteristics
- Type: Amphibious warfare ship
- Displacement: 2,169 t (2,135 long tons) (full)
- Length: 84.1 m (275 ft 11 in)
- Beam: 14.9 m (48 ft 11 in)
- Draft: 2.3 m (7 ft 7 in)
- Propulsion: Two Mirrlees Blackstone ES L8MGR diesel engines, 2,440 bhp (1,820 kW), two shafts
- Speed: 12 knots (22 km/h; 14 mph)
- Range: 4,400 nmi (8,100 km; 5,100 mi) at 12 knots (22 km/h; 14 mph)
- Complement: 9 officers, 36 ratings
- Sensors & processing systems: Decca TM 1229 navigational radar; Kelvin Hughes MS 45 echo sounder; Reifon Omega navigator; Ericsson laser rangefinder; LSE optical rangefinder
- Armament: 1 × OTO Melara 76 mm dual purpose gun; 2 × Oerlikon 20 mm cannon
- Aviation facilities: Deck for 1 helicopter up to a Westland Sea King

Al Munassir was an amphibious warfare vessel operated by the Royal Navy of Oman. It was purchased to enable the kingdom to respond to threats to the strategically important Musandam Governorate. The vessel was launched in 1978 and, after decommissioning, was sunk as an artificial reef in 2003. It is now a popular diving site.

== Design ==
Al Munassir was ordered in 1977 from Brooke Marine by the government of Oman and laid down on 4 July that year. The vessel was designed to transport up to 550 tonnes (540 long tons; 610 short tons) of cargo or 8 main battle tanks along with 188 fully equipped troops which would disembark from bow doors and a ramp. The vessel was 84.1 m (275 ft 11 in) long overall, with a beam of 14.9 m (48 ft 11 in) and a draught of 2.3 m (7 ft 7 in) with a displacement of 2,169 tonnes (2,135 long tons). Power was provided by Two Mirrlees Blackstone ES L8MGR diesel engines rated at 2,440 bhp (1,820 kW) driving two shafts, to give a design speed of 12 knots (22 km/h; 14 mph). Range at that speed was 4,400 nautical miles (8,100 km; 5,100 mi). A complement of forty five, including nine officers, was carried.

Fire support was to be provided by a single OTO Melara 76 mm gun mounted forward and a pair of Oerlikon 20 mm cannon mounted midships, while a helipad aft could accommodate a helicopter up to the size of a Westland Sea King. In addition to an Ericsson laser and LSE optical rangefinders, the vessel was equipped with a Decca TM 1229 navigational radar and Reifon Omega navigator, a Kelvin Hughes MS 45 echo sounder.

== Service ==
Laid down on 4 July 1977, launched on 25 July 1978 and commissioned on 31 January 1979, Al Munassir served as an amphibious operation and logistics vessel for the Omani fleet. The principal purpose for the vessel was to support the Musandam Governorate in the Strait of Hormuz. This area, which is strategically important for the transportation of crude oil, has no land border with the rest of Oman. In the event of a crisis, the vessel, supported by smaller vessels including, from 1985, Nasr al Bahr, was to be used to transport troops and equipment northwards. The vessel was placed in reserve in the mid 1990s and subsequently retired to become a harbour training ship at the end of the twentieth century.

== Fate ==
Al Munassir was sunk as an artificial reef on 22 April 2003 and is now a popular diving destination. The wreck is off the coast of Muscat at 23°31′02″N 58°45′28″E at a depth between 10 and 30 metres (33 and 98 ft). It is now a refuge for wildlife, including the bigeye snapper, bluestreak cleaner wrasse, Indo-Pacific sergeant, moon wrasse, pennant coralfish, ring-tailed cardinalfish, yellowbar angelfish and yellowfin goatfish.

== See also ==
- List of amphibious warfare ships
- List of shipwrecks in 2003
- List of wreck diving sites
