= Negwagon (YTB-834) =

Tugboat of the United States Navy

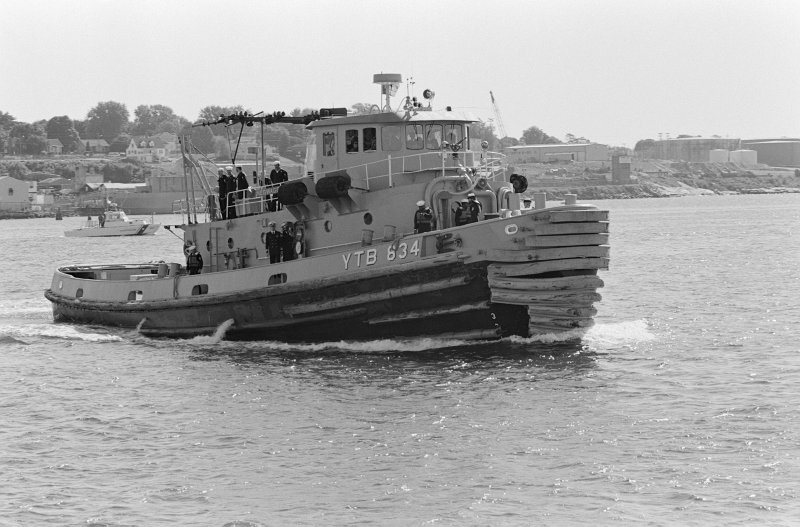
- Starboard bow view of Negwagon (YTB-834) underway at the Naval Submarine Base, New London, CT., 6 October 1984

History

United States
- Awarded: 5 June 1973
- Builder: Marinette Marine, Marinette, Wisconsin
- Laid down: 24 July 1974
- Launched: 27 March 1975
- In service: 19 May 1975
- Stricken: 20 July 2007
- Status: Active in the Hellenic Navy

General characteristics
- Class & type: Natick-class large harbor tug
- Displacement: 283 long tons (288 t) (light); 356 long tons (362 t) (full)
- Length: 108 ft (33 m)
- Beam: 31 ft (9.4 m)
- Draft: 14 ft (4.3 m)
- Speed: 12 knots (14 mph; 22 km/h)
- Complement: 12
- Armament: None

Negwagon (YTB-834) was a United States Navy Natick-class large harbor tug named for Odawa Chief Negwagon. Negwagon was the second US Navy ship to bear the name.

== Construction ==
The contract for Negwagon was awarded 5 June 1973. She was laid down on 24 July 1974 at Marinette, Wisconsin, by Marinette Marine and launched 27 March 1975.

== Operational history ==
First put into service in 1975, Negwagon served at Naval Submarine Base New London Connecticut. Sometime after 1998, Negwagon was transferred to Naval Support Activity, La Maddalena, Italy. Stricken from the Navy List 20 July 2007, ex-Negwagon was transferred to the Hellenic Navy 10 January 2008.
