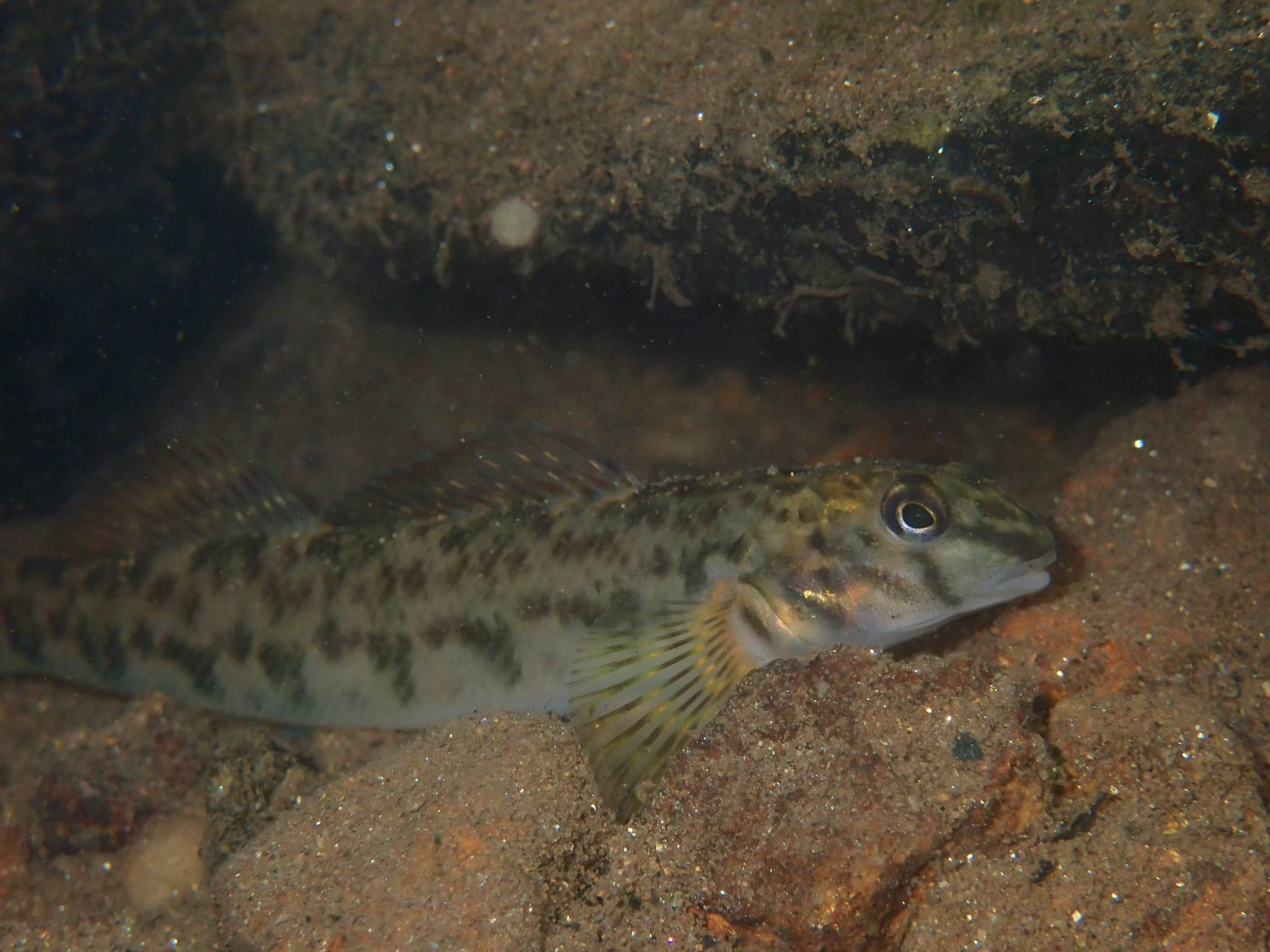

Conservation status
- Least Concern (IUCN 3.1)

Scientific classification
- Kingdom: Animalia
- Phylum: Chordata
- Class: Actinopterygii
- Order: Perciformes
- Family: Percidae
- Genus: Etheostoma
- Species: E. gutselli

Binomial name
- Etheostoma gutselli (Hildebrand, 1932)

Synonyms
- Poecilichthys gutselli Hildebrand, 1932

= Tuckasegee darter =

Species of fish

The Tuckasegee darter (Etheostoma gutselli) is a species of ray-finned fish, a darter from the subfamily Etheostomatinae, part of the family Percidae which includes the perches, ruffes and pike-perches. It is endemic to the eastern United States, where it occurs in the headwaters of the Little Tennessee River and some tributaries to the Pigeon River in eastern Tennessee, western North Carolina and extreme northeastern Georgia. It inhabits fast rocky riffles of creeks and small rivers.
