= MV Fu Shan Hai =

History

China
- Name: Fu Shan Hai
- Owner: COSCO Bulk Carrier Co. Ltd.
- Port of registry: Tianjin, China
- Builder: Jiangnan Shipyard, Shanghai, China
- Launched: 1994
- Identification: IMO number: 9056002; Call sign: BOOE
- Fate: Sunk after collision, 31 May 2003

General characteristics
- Type: Bulk carrier
- Tonnage: 38,603 GT; 69,973 DWT; 24,351 NT
- Length: 225 m (738 ft 2 in)
- Beam: 32.2 m (105 ft 8 in)
- Draught: 13.6 m (44 ft 7 in)
- Propulsion: 8,466 kW (11,353 hp) B&W engine
- Speed: 14.2 knots (26.3 km/h; 16.3 mph) full load
- Crew: 27
- Sensors & processing systems: Tokimec ARPA radar

MV Fu Shan Hai (Chinese: 富山海) was a Chinese bulk carrier which on 31 May 2003 was involved in a collision with the Polish container ship Gdynia north-west of the Danish island of Bornholm in the Baltic Sea. Later the same day Fu Shan Hai sank in 69 metres (226 ft) of water. At that moment, she was the biggest ship to be sunk in the Baltic Sea.

== Ship history ==
Fu Shan Hai was built at the Jiangnan Shipyard, Shanghai, in 1994, and operated by the COSCO Bulk Carrier Company, a Chinese state-owned enterprise for large scale international dry and bulk cargo shipping.

The 38,600-ton ship was 225 metres (738 ft) long and had a beam of 32.2 metres (106 ft). She was powered by a 8,466 kW (11,353 hp) Burmeister & Wain diesel engine, and was capable of 14.2 knots (26.3 km/h; 16.3 mph) when fully laden. She was equipped with Tokimec ARPA radar, GPS and VHF radio communications.

== The collision ==
The Fu Shan Hai had sailed from Ventspils, Latvia, on the afternoon of 30 May having taken on a load of 66,000 tonnes of fertilizer. At 11:45 the next day she was sailing just north of the Danish island of Bornholm in clear weather when she observed visually and by radar another vessel, the Gdynia, 7 nautical miles (13 km; 8.1 mi) distant on a converging course. The Gdynia, a 3,930-ton container ship operated by Euroafrica Shipping Lines of Poland, but registered in Limassol, Cyprus, had sailed from Gdynia, Poland, late on 30 May on a voyage to Hull, England.

At 12:00 the Gdynia, now at a distance of 4 nmi, reduced speed, and at 12:09 altered course to starboard in order to pass astern of the Fu Shan Hai. In fact she was now on a collision course. At 12:10 hours, the master of Fu Shan Hai gave several short blasts of the ships whistle as a warning. There was no response, so the ship stopped her engines, in an attempt to avoid a collision, but did not change course. At 12:18 hours, at position 55°20.8′N 014°44.26′E the Gdynia struck Fu Shan Hai squarely on the port side driving her bows into the ship between holds 1 and 2. After the collision Fu Shan Hai made for shallower waters, but was unable to steer. As water poured into the ship, the bows began to sink. At 12:37 Fu Shan Hai broadcast a mayday on Channel 16, and the lifeboats were lowered in readiness. The ship was abandoned by 13:50, and finally sank at 20:49 hours. Gdynia returned to port having suffered damage to her bows. There were no injuries.

== The investigation ==
The Division for the Investigation of Maritime Accidents of the Danish Maritime Authority investigated the incident, and noted that the 2nd Officer, who was in charge of Gdynia, failed to take appropriate measures to avoid a collision. The master of Fu Shan Hai was also criticized for not changing course or putting his engines into reverse. Neither ship used their VHF marine radios to communicate their intentions. A hearing held at Rønne on 12 December 2005 ruled that Gdynia was solely liable for the collision, and the owners were ordered to pay damages totalling 107 million Swedish kronor (equivalent to about US$16.2m).

== See also ==
- International Regulations for Preventing Collisions at Sea
