= Wanamassa (YTB-820) =

Tugboat of the United States Navy

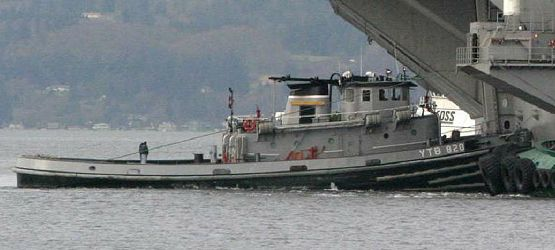
- Wanamassa (YTB-820)

History

United States
- Namesake: Wanamassa, New Jersey
- Awarded: 9 August 1971
- Builder: Marinette Marine Corporation, Marinette, Wisconsin
- Laid down: 28 October 1972
- Launched: 4 May 1973
- Acquired: 28 July 1973
- Home port: Guantanamo Bay
- Status: Active

General characteristics
- Class & type: Natick-class large harbor tug
- Displacement: 286 long tons (291 t) (light); 346 long tons (352 t) (full)
- Length: 108 ft (33 m)
- Beam: 31 ft (9.4 m)
- Draft: 14 ft (4.3 m)
- Installed power: 2000 horsepower (1.5 MW)
- Propulsion: one diesel engine, one screw
- Speed: 12 knots (14 mph; 22 km/h)
- Complement: 12

Wanamassa (YTB-820) is a United States Navy Natick-class large harbor tug named for Wanamassa, New Jersey.

== Construction ==
The contract for Wanamassa was awarded 9 August 1971. She was laid down on 28 October 1972 at Marinette, Wisconsin, by Marinette Marine and launched 4 May 1973.

== Operational history ==
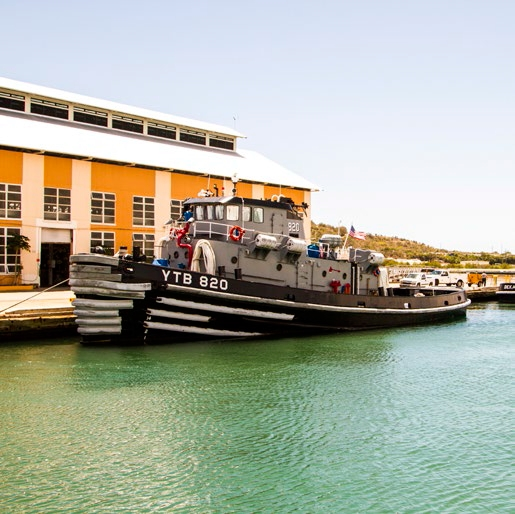
Wanamassa, moored at Pier Tango, Guantanamo, on 1 April 2015, when she was one of the last five tugs of her class to remain in service

Delivered to the U.S. Navy on 28 July 1973, Wanamassa was initially assigned to the 10th Naval District and operated out of San Juan, Puerto Rico, aiding ships in berthing and docking maneuvers and standing ready to provide waterfront fire protection.

In the latter half of the 1970s, she was transferred to the Guantanamo Bay Naval Base, in Cuba. She remained in active service at Guantanamo as late as April 2015. The three Natick class tugs at Guantanamo remain among the last five to remain in service.
