= Dekanawida (YTB-831) =

Tugboat of the United States Navy

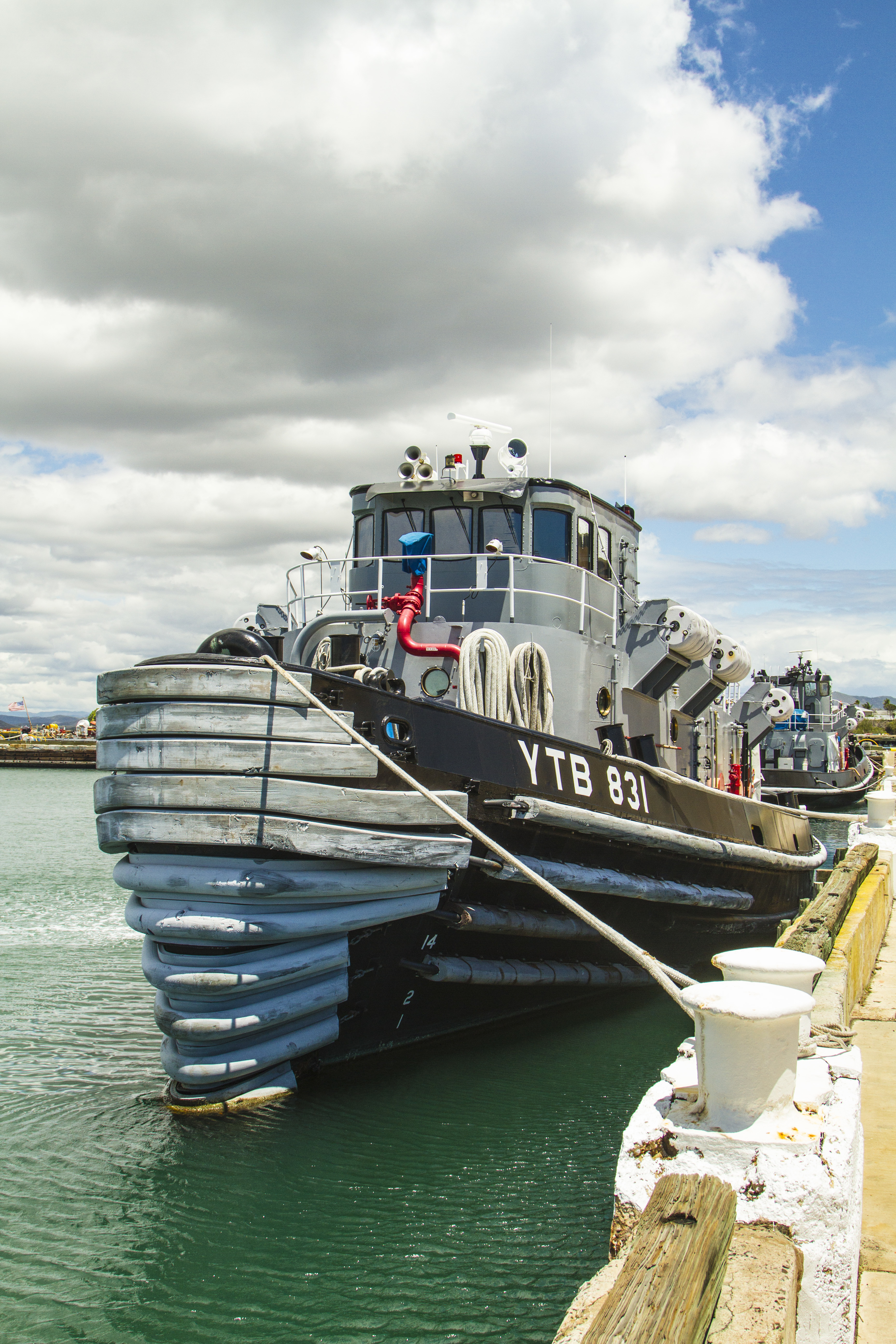
- Dekanawida (YTB-831) moored at pier Tango in Guantanamo Bay, 1 April 2015.

History

United States
- Awarded: 5 June 1973
- Builder: Marinette Marine, Marinette, Wisconsin
- Laid down: 22 January 1974
- Launched: 12 September 1974
- In service: 31 October 1974
- Status: Active as of 2015

General characteristics
- Class & type: Natick-class large harbor tug
- Displacement: 286 long tons (291 t) (light); 346 long tons (352 t) (full)
- Length: 108 ft (33 m)
- Beam: 31 ft (9.4 m)
- Draft: 14 ft (4.3 m)
- Speed: 12 knots (14 mph; 22 km/h)
- Complement: 12
- Armament: None

Dekanawida (YTB-831) is a United States Navy Natick-class large harbor tug named for the Great Peacemaker who, by tradition, was one of the founders of the Iroquois Confederacy. Dekanawida was the second US Navy ship to bear the name.

== Construction ==
The contract for Dekanawida was awarded 5 June 1973. She was laid down on 22 January 1974 at Marinette, Wisconsin, by Marinette Marine and launched 12 September 1974.

== Operational history ==
Dekanawida remained in active service at the Naval Station Guantanamo Bay, Cuba as late as April 1, 2015.
