= Niantic (YTB-781) =

Tugboat of the United States Navy

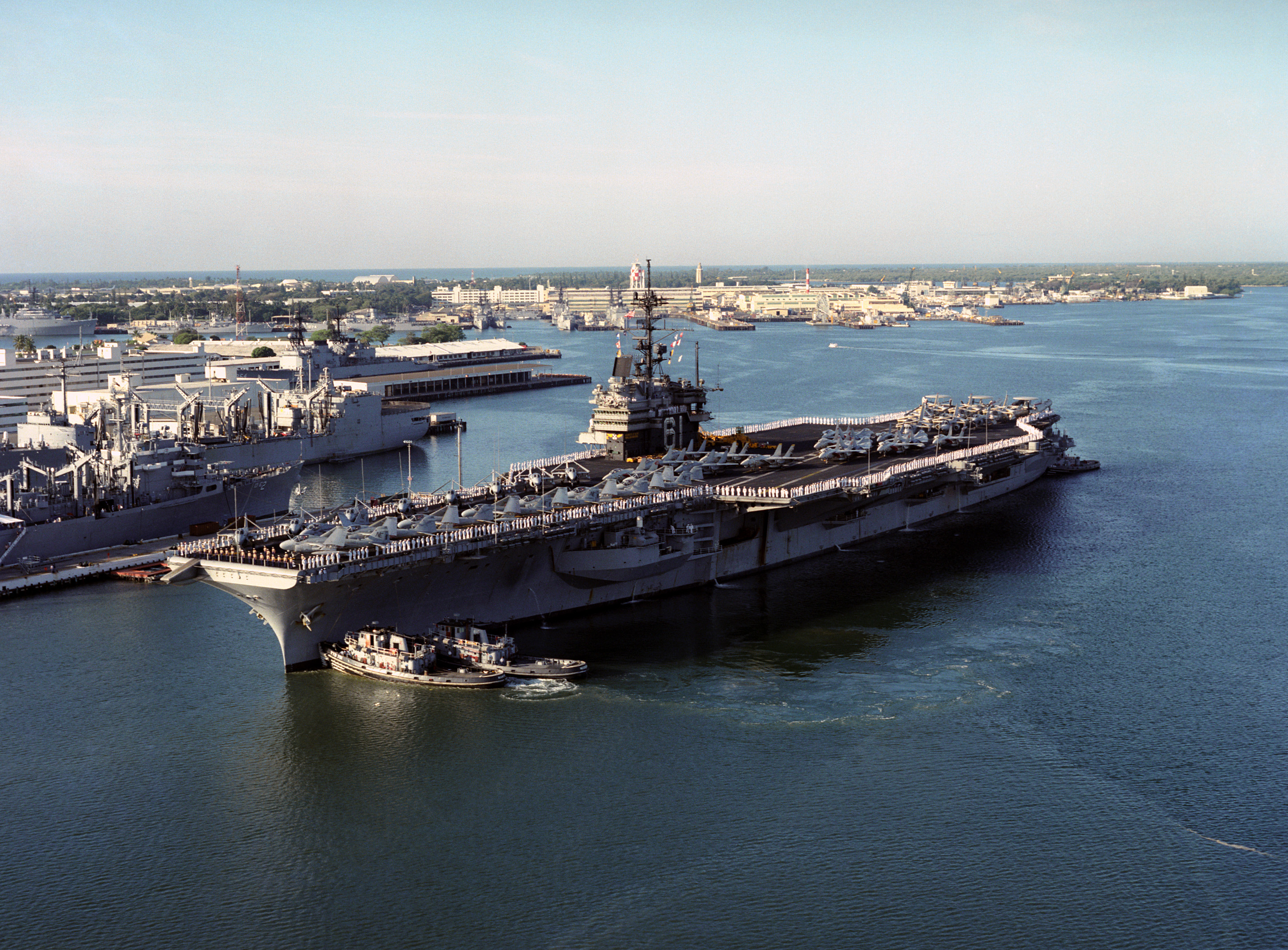
- An aerial port side view of USS Ranger (CV 61), with her sailors manning the rails and aircraft of Carrier Air Wing 2 (CVW-2) on her deck, as she is nudged into position by harbor tugs Niantic, Neodesha (YTB-815), and Waxahachie (YTB-814) upon arrival at Naval Station Pearl Harbor, Hawaii, 8 March 1993.

History

United States
- Ordered: 31 January 1964
- Builder: Marinette Marine, Marinette, Wisconsin
- Laid down: 10 December 1964
- Launched: 7 September 1965
- Acquired: 10 November 1965
- In service: 1966
- Out of service: 26 April 2006
- Stricken: 26 April 2006
- Fate: Sold by Defense Reutilization and Marketing Service (DRMS) reuse/conversion, 11 February 2008

General characteristics
- Class & type: Natick-class large harbor tug
- Displacement: 283 long tons (288 t) (light); 356 long tons (362 t) (full)
- Length: 109 ft (33 m)
- Beam: 31 ft (9.4 m)
- Draft: 14 ft (4.3 m)
- Propulsion: Diesel engine, single screw
- Speed: 12 knots (14 mph; 22 km/h)
- Complement: 12

Niantic (YTB–781) was a United States Navy Natick-class large harbor tug named for Niantic, Connecticut.

== Construction ==
The contract for Niantic was awarded on 31 January 1964. She was laid down on 10 December 1964 at Marinette, Wisconsin, by Marinette Marine and launched 7 September 1965.

== Operational history ==
Placed in service in the 14th Naval District in June 1966, Niantic was assigned to the 14th Naval District, headquartered at Pearl Harbor, Hawaii.

Stricken from the Navy List 26 April 2006, Niantic was sold by Defense Reutilization and Marketing Service (DRMS) for reuse or conversion, 11 February 2008.
