= Wanamassa, New Jersey =

Populated place in Monmouth County, New Jersey, US

- Census-designated place
- Location of Wanamassa in Monmouth County highlighted in red (left). Inset map: Location of Monmouth County in New Jersey highlighted in orange (right).

- Location in Monmouth County Location in New Jersey Location in the United States
- Coordinates: 40.236816°N 74.028865°W
- Country: United States
- State: New Jersey
- County: Monmouth
- Township: Ocean
- Named for: Native American leader Wanamassa

Area
  - Total: 1.15 sq mi (2.98 km^{2})
  - Land: 1.11 sq mi (2.88 km^{2})
  - Water: 0.039 sq mi (0.10 km^{2}) 3.27%
- Elevation: 33 ft (10 m)

Population (2020)
  - Total: 4,344
  - Density: 3,900.1/sq mi (1,505.82/km^{2})
- Time zone: UTC−05:00 (Eastern (EST))
  - Summer (DST): UTC−04:00 (Eastern (EDT))
- ZIP Code: 07712 (Asbury Park)
- Area codes: 732/848
- FIPS code: 34-76700
- GNIS feature ID: 02390450

Wanamassa /wɑːnɑːmæsə/ is an unincorporated community and census-designated place (CDP) within Ocean Township, in Monmouth County, New Jersey, United States. As of the 2020 census, the CDP's population was 4,344, making it the most populated neighborhood in Ocean Township. The community was named for Wanamassa, a Native American leader of the 17th century.

== Geography ==
The community is in eastern Monmouth County, in southeastern Ocean Township. It is bordered to the east by the borough of Interlaken and to the southeast by the city of Asbury Park. New Jersey Route 35 forms the western border of the CDP, leading north 4 miles (6 km) to Eatontown and south 3 miles (5 km) to Neptune City.

According to the U.S. Census Bureau, the Wanamassa CDP has a total area of 1.152 square miles (2.98 km^{2}), including 1.114 square miles (2.89 km^{2}) of land and 0.038 square miles (0.098 km^{2}) of water (3.30%). Deal Lake lies along the southern edge of the community.

== Demographics ==
Historical population
Census	Pop.	Note	%±
1950	2,512		—
1960	3,928		56.4%
1990	4,530		—
2000	4,551		0.5%
2010	4,532		−0.4%
2020	4,344		−4.1%
Population sources: 1950 1960 1970; 1980 1990 2000; 2010 2020

Wanamassa first appeared as an unincorporated community in the 1950 U.S. census. It did not appear in the 1970 U.S. census or the 1980 U.S. census; and then was listed as a census designated place in the 1990 U.S. census.

=== 2020 census ===
As of the 2020 census, Wanamassa had a population of 4,344. The median age was 43.0 years. 19.6% of residents were under the age of 18 and 17.5% of residents were 65 years of age or older. For every 100 females there were 97.8 males, and for every 100 females age 18 and over there were 96.0 males age 18 and over.

100.0% of residents lived in urban areas, while 0.0% lived in rural areas.

There were 1,640 households in Wanamassa, of which 29.5% had children under the age of 18 living in them. Of all households, 58.5% were married-couple households, 12.9% were households with a male householder and no spouse or partner present, and 23.8% were households with a female householder and no spouse or partner present. About 21.0% of all households were made up of individuals and 12.2% had someone living alone who was 65 years of age or older.

There were 1,727 housing units, of which 5.0% were vacant. The homeowner vacancy rate was 1.0% and the rental vacancy rate was 4.4%.

Racial composition as of the 2020 census
Race	Number	Percent
White	3,622	83.4%
Black or African American	93	2.1%
American Indian and Alaska Native	6	0.1%
Asian	163	3.8%
Native Hawaiian and Other Pacific Islander	3	0.1%
Some other race	143	3.3%
Two or more races	314	7.2%
Hispanic or Latino (of any race)	373	8.6%

=== 2010 census ===
The 2010 United States census counted 4,532 people, 1,648 households, and 1,229 families in the CDP. The population density was 4,068.6 people per square mile (1,570.9 people/km^{2}). There were 1,709 housing units at an average density of 1,534.3 units per square mile (592.4 units/km^{2}). The racial makeup was 88.39% (4,006) White, 3.42% (155) Black or African American, 0.35% (16) Native American, 4.39% (199) Asian, 0.20% (9) Pacific Islander, 1.21% (55) from other races, and 2.03% (92) from two or more races. Hispanic or Latino of any race were 6.47% (293) of the population.

Of the 1,648 households, 34.1% had children under the age of 18; 58.5% were married couples living together; 11.8% had a female householder with no husband present and 25.4% were non-families. Of all households, 19.6% were made up of individuals and 7.7% had someone living alone who was 65 years of age or older. The average household size was 2.75 and the average family size was 3.20.

24.1% of the population were under the age of 18, 7.7% from 18 to 24, 23.5% from 25 to 44, 32.7% from 45 to 64, and 12.0% who were 65 years of age or older. The median age was 41.6 years. For every 100 females, the population had 97.9 males. For every 100 females ages 18 and older there were 92.8 males.

=== 2000 census ===
As of the 2000 United States census there were 4,551 people, 1,657 households, and 1,277 families living in the CDP. The population density was 1,568.9 people/km^{2} (4,063 people/mi^{2}). There were 1,701 housing units at an average density of 586.4 units/km^{2} (1,519 units/mi^{2}). The racial makeup of the CDP was 94.24% White, 1.27% African American, 0.13% Native American, 2.83% Asian, 0.18% Pacific Islander, 0.46% from other races, and 0.88% from two or more races. Hispanic or Latino of any race were 2.99% of the population.

There were 1,657 households, out of which 39.2% had children under the age of 18 living with them, 62.3% were married couples living together, 11.3% had a female householder with no husband present, and 22.9% were non-families. 18.6% of all households were made up of individuals, and 8.4% had someone living alone who was 65 years of age or older. The average household size was 2.75 and the average family size was 3.15.

In the CDP the population was spread out, with 26.5% under the age of 18, 5.9% from 18 to 24, 30.1% from 25 to 44, 24.5% from 45 to 64, and 13.0% who were 65 years of age or older. The median age was 38 years. For every 100 females, there were 94.3 males. For every 100 females age 18 and over, there were 90.4 males.

The median income for a household in the CDP was $61,607, and the median income for a family was $64,960. Males had a median income of $51,768 versus $35,000 for females. The per capita income for the CDP was $26,759. About 0.9% of families and 1.6% of the population were below the poverty line, including 1.5% of those under age 18 and none of those age 65 or over.

== Transportation ==
New Jersey Transit offers train service on the North Jersey Coast Line at the Allenhurst and Asbury Park stations. NJ Transit local bus service is available on the 832 and 837 routes.

== Notable people ==
People who were born in, residents of, or otherwise closely associated with Wanamassa include:

- Bruce Springsteen (born 1949), musician
- George Stetter (born 1945), Canadian football player who played for the Montreal Alouettes and Ottawa Rough Riders
