= Natick-class tugboat =

1960 harbor tugboat class

Natick class
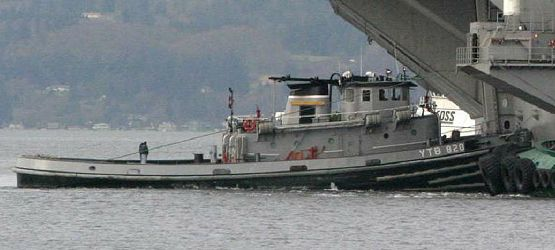
- Wanamassa (YTB-820)

Class overview
- Name: Natick class
- Operators: United States Navy; Egyptian Navy
- Preceded by: Pontiac class
- Built: 1960-1974
- Planned: 77
- Completed: 77
- Active: 5
- Retired: 72

General characteristics
- Type: Tugboat
- Displacement: 283 long tons (288 t) (light); 356 long tons (362 t) (full)
- Length: 109 ft (33 m)
- Beam: 31 ft (9.4 m)
- Draft: 14 ft (4.3 m)
- Speed: 12 knots (14 mph; 22 km/h)
- Complement: 12

The Natick class is a class of harbor tugboats that have been active since the 1960s. Members of the class are named for Native American peoples and their members, USS Redwing excepted. As of 1 April 2015, five to eight Natick-class tugs remain in active service. Members of this class were designed under project SCB 147A.

== In active service ==
In active service
Ship name	Hull no.	Reference
Dekanawida	YTB-831	
Manhattan	YTB-779; YT-800	
Santaquin	YTB-824	
Wanamassa	YTB-820	
Washtucna	YTB-826; YT-801	
