= List of units of the United States Navy =

Units (commands) of the United States Navy are as follows. The list is organized along administrative chains of command (CoC), and does not include the CNO's office or shore establishments.

Deployable/operational U.S. Navy units typically have two CoCs – the operational chain and the administrative chain. Operational CoCs change quite often based on a unit's location and current mission.

For example, USS Roosevelt is always administratively assigned to Commander, Naval Air Force, Atlantic Fleet (CNAL). It might also be operationally assigned to CNAL early in its inter-deployment readiness cycle (IDRC). Before 2010, later in the IDRC, it would have been assigned to Commander, Second Fleet, which is responsible for Carrier Strike Group (CSG) training and operations on the east coast. Once the CSG deploys and crosses over the inter-UCC boundary in the mid-Atlantic, it then reports (is "chopped") to the Sixth Fleet (responsible for European waters and the Mediterranean Sea). Once the CSG enters the Suez Canal, it "chops" to the Fifth Fleet for operational control. Operationally, the Roosevelt CSG chain of command is: Commander Fifth Fleet, Commander U.S. Naval Forces Central Command, Commander U.S. Central Command, United States Secretary of Defense, President of the United States.

== United States Pacific Fleet (NS Pearl Harbor, HI) ==
=== United States Third Fleet (NB Point Loma, CA) ===
- USS Zumwalt (DDG-1000) (NB San Diego, CA)
- USS Michael Monsoor (DDG-1001) (NB San Diego, CA)

==== Carrier Strike Group 1 (CSG-1) (NB San Diego, CA) ====
- USS Carl Vinson (CVN-70) (NAS North Island, CA)
- USS Lake Erie (CG-70)
- USS Princeton (CG-59)
- Destroyer Squadron 1 (DESRON-1)
  - USS Kidd (DDG-100)
  - USS Sterett (DDG-104)
  - USS William P. Lawrence (DDG-110)
- Carrier Air Wing 2 (CVW-2) (NAS Lemoore, CA)
  - Strike Fighter Squadron 2 (VFA-2)
  - Strike Fighter Squadron 113 (VFA-113)
  - Strike Fighter Squadron 147 (VFA-147)
  - Strike Fighter Squadron 192 (VFA-192)
  - Carrier Airborne Early Warning Squadron 113 (VAW-113) (NAS Point Mugu, CA)
  - Electronic Attack Squadron 136 (VAQ-136) (NAS Whidbey Island, WA)
  - Fleet Logistics Support Squadron 30, Detachment 2 (VRC-30 Det. 2) (NAS North Island, CA)
  - Helicopter Sea Combat Squadron 4 (HSC-4) (NAS North Island, CA)
  - Helicopter Maritime Strike Squadron 78 (HSM-78) (NAS North Island, CA)

==== Carrier Strike Group 3 (CSG-3) (NB San Diego, CA) ====
- USS Abraham Lincoln (CVN-72) (NAS North Island, CA)
- Destroyer Squadron 21 (DESRON-21)
  - USS Dewey (DDG-105)
  - USS Spruance (DDG-111)
  - USS Decatur (DDG-73)
  - USS Stockdale (DDG-106)
  - USS Stethem (DDG-63)
- Carrier Air Wing 9 (CVW-9) (NAS Lemoore, CA)
  - Strike Fighter Squadron 14 (VFA-14)
  - Strike Fighter Squadron 41 (VFA-41)
  - Marine Fighter Attack Squadron 314 (VMFA-314) (MCAS Miramar, CA)
  - Strike Fighter Squadron 151 (VFA-151)
  - Electronic Attack Squadron 133 (VAQ-133) (NAS Whidbey Island, WA)
  - Carrier Airborne Early Warning Squadron 117 (VAW-117) (NAS Point Mugu, CA)
  - Helicopter Sea Combat Squadron 14 (HSC-14) (NAS North Island, CA)
  - Helicopter Maritime Strike Squadron 71 (HSM-71) (NAS North Island, CA)
  - Fleet Logistics Support Squadron 30, Detachment 1 (VRC-30 Det. 1) (NAS North Island, CA)

==== Carrier Strike Group 9 (CSG-9) (NB San Diego, CA) ====
- USS Theodore Roosevelt (CVN-71) (NAS North Island, CA)
- USS Chosin (CG-65)
- USS Cape St. George (CG-71)
- Destroyer Squadron 23 (DESRON-23)
  - USS John S. McCain (DDG-56)
  - USS Russell (DDG-59)
  - USS Chafee (DDG-90)
  - USS Pinckney (DDG-91)
  - USS Halsey (DDG-97)
- Carrier Air Wing 11 (CVW-11) (NAS Lemoore, CA)
  - Strike Fighter Squadron 154 (VFA-154)
  - Strike Fighter Squadron 31 (VFA-31)
  - Strike Fighter Squadron 146 (VFA-146)
  - Strike Fighter Squadron 87 (VFA-87)
  - Carrier Airborne Early Warning Squadron 115 (VAW-115) (NAS Point Mugu, CA)
  - Electronic Attack Squadron 142 (VAQ-142) (NAS Whidbey Island, CA)
  - Fleet Logistics Support Squadron 30, Detachment 3 (VRC-30 Det. 3) (NAS North Island, CA)
  - Helicopter Sea Combat Squadron 8 (HSC-8) (NAS North Island, CA)
  - Helicopter Maritime Strike Squadron 75 (HSM-75) (NAS North Island, CA)

==== Carrier Strike Group 11 (CSG-11) (NS Everett, WA) ====
- USS Nimitz (CVN-68) (NB Kitsap–Bremerton, WA)
- Destroyer Squadron 9 (DESRON-9)
  - USS Barry (DDG-52)
  - USS John Paul Jones (DDG-53)
  - USS John S. McCain (DDG-56)
  - USS Kidd (DDG-100)
  - USS Gridley (DDG-101)
  - USS Sampson (DDG-102)
- Carrier Air Wing 17 (CVW-17) (NAS Lemoore, CA)
  - Strike Fighter Squadron 22 (VFA-22)
  - Marine Fighter Attack Squadron 323 (VMFA-323) (MCAS Miramar, CA)
  - Strike Fighter Squadron 94 (VFA-94)
  - Strike Fighter Squadron 137 (VFA-137)
  - Electronic Attack Squadron 139 (VAQ-139) (NAS Whidbey Island, WA)
  - Carrier Airborne Early Warning Squadron 116 (VAW-116) (NAS Point Mugu, CA)
  - Helicopter Sea Combat Squadron 6 (HSC-6) (NAS North Island, CA)
  - Helicopter Maritime Strike Squadron 73 (HSM-73) (NAS North Island, CA)
  - Fleet Logistics Support Squadron 30, Detachment 4 (VRC-30 Det. 4) (NAS North Island, CA)

==== Naval Surface Group Middle Pacific (NS Pearl Harbor, HI) ====
- USS Shiloh (CG-67)

===== Destroyer Squadron 31 (DESRON-31) =====
- USS John Paul Jones (DDG-53)
- USS Hopper (DDG-70)
- USS Chung-Hoon (DDG-93)
- USS Wayne E. Meyer (DDG-108)
- USS William P. Lawrence (DDG-110)
- USS Michael Murphy (DDG-112)
- USS Daniel Inouye (DDG-118)

==== Expeditionary Strike Group 3 (ESG-3) (NB San Diego, CA) ====
- USS Essex (LHD-2)
- USS Boxer (LHD-4)
- USS Makin Island (LHD-8)
- USS Green Bay (LPD-20)
- USS Anchorage (LPD-23)
- USS Somerset (LPD-25)
- USS John P. Murtha (LPD-26)
- USS Portland (LPD-27)
- USS Germantown (LSD-42)
- USS Comstock (LSD-45)
- USS Ashland (LSD-48)
- USS Harpers Ferry (LSD-49)
- USS Pearl Harbor (LSD-52)

==== Littoral Combat Ship Squadron 1 (LCSRON-1) (NB San Diego, CA) ====
- USS Fort Worth (LCS-3)
- USS Jackson (LCS-6)
- USS Montgomery (LCS-8)
- USS Gabrielle Giffords (LCS-10)
- USS Omaha (LCS-12)
- USS Manchester (LCS-14)
- USS Tulsa (LCS-16)
- USS Charleston (LCS-18)
- USS Cincinnati (LCS-20)
- USS Kansas City (LCS-22)
- USS Oakland (LCS-24)
- USS Mobile (LCS-26)
- USS Savannah (LCS-28)
- USS Canberra (LCS-30)
- USS Santa Barbara (LCS-32)
- USS Augusta (LCS-34)
- USS Kingsville (LCS-36)

==== Submarine Squadron 1 (SUBRON-1) (NS Pearl Harbor, HI) ====
- USS Hawaii (SSN-776)
- USS North Carolina (SSN-777)
- USS Mississippi (SSN-782)
- USS Illinois (SSN-786)
- USS Vermont (SSN-792)
- USS Montana (SSN-794)

==== Submarine Squadron 7 (SUBRON 7) (NS Pearl Harbor, HI) ====
- USS Charlotte (SSN-766)
- USS Toledo (SSN-769)
- USS Tucson (SSN-770)
- USS Columbia (SSN-771)
- USS Missouri (SSN-780)
- USS Colorado (SSN-788)
- USS Indiana (SSN-789)

==== Submarine Squadron 17 (SUBRON-17) (NB Kitsap–Bangor, WA) ====
- USS Henry M. Jackson (SSBN-730)
- USS Alabama (SSBN-731)
- USS Nevada (SSBN-733)
- USS Kentucky (SSBN-737)
- USS Nebraska (SSBN-739)
- USS Maine (SSBN-741)
- USS Louisiana (SSBN-743)

==== Submarine Squadron 19 (SUBRON-19) (NB Kitsap–Bangor, WA) ====
- USS San Juan (SSN-751)
- USS Topeka (SSN-754)
- USS Ohio (SSGN-726)
- USS Michigan (SSGN-727)
- USS Pennsylvania (SSBN-735)

==== Submarine Development Squadron 5 (SUBDEVRON-5) (NB Kitsap–Bremerton, WA) ====
- USS Seawolf (SSN-21)
- USS Connecticut (SSN-22)
- USS Jimmy Carter (SSN-23) (NB Kitsap–Bangor, WA)

==== Submarine Squadron 11 (SUBRON-11) (NB Point Loma, CA) ====
- USS Scranton (SSN-756)
- USS Alexandria (SSN-757)
- USS Santa Fe (SSN-763)
- USS Hampton (SSN-767)
- USS Indianapolis (SSN-697)
- USS Greeneville (SSN-772)

==== Patrol and Reconnaissance Wing 10 (PATWING-10) (NAS Whidbey Island, WA) ====
- Patrol Squadron 1 (VP-1)
- Patrol Squadron 4 (VP-4)
- Patrol Squadron 9 (VP-9)
- Patrol Squadron 40 (VP-40)
- Patrol Squadron 46 (VP-46)
- Patrol Squadron 47 (VP-47)
- Patrol Squadron Special Unit 2 (VPU-2) (MCAS Kaneohe Bay, HI)
- Unmanned Patrol Squadron 11 (VUP-11)
- Fleet Air Reconnaissance Squadron 1 (VQ-1)

==== Airborne Command Control Logistics Wing ====
- Fleet Logistics Multi-Mission Squadron 30 (VRM-30) (NAS North Island, CA)

=== United States Seventh Fleet (CFA Yokosuka, Japan) ===
- USS Emory S. Land (AS-39) (NB Guam, Guam)
- USS Frank Cable (AS-40) (NB Guam, Guam)

==== Carrier Strike Group 5 (CSG-5) (CFA Yokosuka, Japan) ====
- USS George Washington (CVN-73)
- USS Robert Smalls (CG-62)
- Destroyer Squadron 15 (DESRON-15)
  - USS Benfold (DDG-65)
  - USS Milius (DDG-69)
  - USS Preble (DDG-88)
  - USS Howard (DDG-83)
  - USS McCampbell (DDG-85)
  - USS Dewey (DDG-105)
  - USS John Finn (DDG-113)
  - USS Ralph Johnson (DDG-114)
  - USS Rafael Peralta (DDG-115)
- Carrier Air Wing 5 (CVW-5) (NAF Atsugi, Japan)
  - Strike Fighter Squadron 27 (VFA-27) (MCAS Iwakuni, Japan)
  - Strike Fighter Squadron 102 (VFA-102) (MCAS Iwakuni, Japan)
  - Strike Fighter Squadron 115 (VFA-115) (MCAS Iwakuni, Japan)
  - Strike Fighter Squadron 195 (VFA-195) (MCAS Iwakuni, Japan)
  - Carrier Airborne Early Warning Squadron 125 (VAW-125) (MCAS Iwakuni, Japan)
  - Electronic Attack Squadron 141 (VAQ-141) (MCAS Iwakuni, Japan)
  - Fleet Logistics Support Squadron 30, Detachment 5 (VRC-30 Det. 5) (MCAS Iwakuni, Japan)
  - Helicopter Sea Combat Squadron 12 (HSC-12)
  - Helicopter Maritime Strike Squadron 77

==== Expeditionary Strike Group 7 (ESG-7) (CFA Sasebo, Japan) ====
- USS Blue Ridge (LCC-19) (CFA Yokosuka, Japan)
- USS New Orleans (LPD-18)
- USS San Diego (LPD-22)
- USS Ashland (LSD-47)

==== Mine Countermeasures Squadron 7 (MCMRON-7) (USFA Sasebo, Japan) ====
- USS Patriot (MCM-7)
- USS Pioneer (MCM-9)
- USS Warrior (MCM-10)
- USS Chief (MCM-14)

==== Submarine Squadron 15 (SUBRON-15) (NB Guam, Guam) ====
- USS Asheville (SSN-758)
- USS Jefferson City (SSN-759)
- USS Annapolis (SSN-760)
- USS Springfield (SSN-761)

== United States Fleet Forces Command (NSA Hampton Roads, VA) ==
=== United States Second Fleet (NSA Hampton Roads, VA) ===
==== Carrier Strike Group 2 (CSG-2) (NS Norfolk, VA) ====
- USS Dwight D. Eisenhower (CVN-69)
- Destroyer Squadron 22 (DESRON-22)
  - USS Mitscher (DDG-57)
  - USS Laboon (DDG-58)
  - USS Mahan (DDG-72)
  - USS Thomas Hudner (DDG-116)
  - USS Porter (DDG-78)
- Carrier Air Wing 7 (CVW-7) (NAS Oceana, VA)
  - Strike Fighter Squadron 143 (VFA-143)
  - Strike Fighter Squadron 103 (VFA-103)
  - Strike Fighter Squadron 86 (VFA-86)
  - Strike Fighter Squadron 25 (VFA-25)
  - Electronic Attack Squadron 140 (VAQ-140) (NAS Whidbey Island, WA)
  - Carrier Airborne Early Warning Squadron 121 (VAW-121) (NS Norfolk, VA)
  - Helicopter Sea Combat Squadron 5 (HSC-5) (NS Norfolk, VA)
  - Helicopter Maritime Strike Squadron 79 (HSM-79) (NAS Jacksonville, FL)
  - Fleet Logistics Support Squadron 40, Detachment 3 (VRC-40 Det. 3) (NS Norfolk, VA)

==== Carrier Strike Group 8 (CSG-8) (NS Norfolk, VA) ====
- USS Harry S. Truman (CVN-75)
- Destroyer Squadron 28 (DESRON-28)
  - USS Gonzalez (DDG-66)
  - USS Cole (DDG-67)
  - USS Bainbridge (DDG-96)
  - USS Forrest Sherman (DDG-98)
  - USS Gravely (DDG-107)
- Carrier Air Wing 1 (CVW-1) (NAS Oceana, VA)
  - Strike Fighter Squadron 11 (VFA-11)
  - Strike Fighter Squadron 81 (VFA-81)
  - Strike Fighter Squadron 34 (VFA-34)
  - Strike Fighter Squadron 211 (VFA-211)
  - Carrier Airborne Early Warning Squadron 126 (VAW-126) (NS Norfolk, VA)
  - Electronic Attack Squadron 137 (VAQ-137) (NAS Whidbey Island, WA)
  - Fleet Logistics Support Squadron 40, Detachment 2 (VRC-40, Det. 2) (NS Norfolk, VA)
  - Helicopter Sea Combat Squadron 11 (HSC-11) (NS Norfolk, VA)
  - Helicopter Maritime Strike Squadron 72 (HSM-72) (NAS Jacksonville, FL)

==== Carrier Strike Group 10 (CSG-10) (NS Norfolk, VA) ====
- USS George H.W. Bush (CVN-77)
- Destroyer Squadron 26 (DESRON-26)
  - USS Stout (DDG-55)
  - USS McFaul (DDG-74)
  - USS James E. Williams (DDG-95)
  - USS Truxtun (DDG-103)
- Carrier Air Wing 3 (CVW-3) (NAS Oceana, VA)
  - Strike Fighter Squadron 32 (VFA-32)
  - Strike Fighter Squadron 83 (VFA-83)
  - Strike Fighter Squadron 105 (VFA-105)
  - Strike Fighter Squadron 131 (VFA-131)
  - Carrier Airborne Early Warning Squadron 123 (VAW-123) (NS Norfolk, VA)
  - Electronic Attack Squadron 130 (VAQ-130) (NAS Whidbey Island, WA)
  - Fleet Logistics Support Squadron 40, Detachment 4 (VRC-40 Det. 4) (NS Norfolk, VA)
  - Helicopter Sea Combat Squadron 7 (HSC-7) (NS Norfolk, VA)
  - Helicopter Maritime Strike Squadron 74 (HSM-74) (NAS Jacksonville, FL)

==== Carrier Strike Group 12 (CSG-12) (NS Norfolk, VA) ====
- USS Gerald R. Ford (CVN-78)
- USS Gettysburg (CG-64)
- Destroyer Squadron 2 (DESRON-2)
  - USS Nitze (DDG-94)
- Carrier Air Wing 8 (CVW-8) (NAS Oceana, VA)
  - Strike Fighter Squadron 37 (VFA-37)
  - Strike Fighter Squadron 97 (VFA-97)
  - Strike Fighter Squadron 213 (VFA-213)
  - Carrier Airborne Early Warning Squadron 124 (VAW-124) (NS Norfolk, VA)
  - Electronic Attack Squadron 131 (VAQ-131) (NAS Whidbey Island, VA)
  - Fleet Logistics Support Squadron 40, Detachment 2 (VRC-40 Det. 2) (NS Norfolk, VA)
  - Helicopter Sea Combat Squadron 9 (HSC-9) (NS Norfolk, VA)
  - Helicopter Maritime Strike Squadron 70 (HSM-70) (NAS Jacksonville, FL)

==== Surface Squadron 14 (SURFRON-14) (NS Mayport, FL) ====
- USS Ramage (DDG-61)
- USS Carney (DDG-64)
- USS The Sullivans (DDG-68)
- USS Donald Cook (DDG-75)
- USS Winston S. Churchill (DDG-81)
- USS Lassen (DDG-82)
- USS Mason (DDG-87)
- USS Farragut (DDG-99)
- USS Jason Dunham (DDG-109)
- USS Thomas Hudner (DDG-116)
- USS Delbert D. Black (DDG-119)
- USS John Basilone (DDG-122)

==== Expeditionary Strike Group 2 (ESG-2) (NS Norfolk, VA) ====
- USS Wasp (LHD-1)
- USS Kearsarge (LHD-3)
- USS Bataan (LHD-5)
- USS Iwo Jima (LHD-7)
- USS San Antonio (LPD-17)
- USS Mesa Verde (LPD-19)
- USS New York (LPD-21)
- USS Arlington (LPD-24)
- USS Fort Lauderdale (LPD-28)
- USS Gunston Hall (LSD-44) (NAB Little Creek, VA)
- USS Tortuga (LSD-46) (NAB Little Creek, VA)
- USS Carter Hall (LSD-50) (NAB Little Creek, VA)
- USS Oak Hill (LSD-51) (NAB Little Creek, VA)

==== Littoral Combat Ship Squadron 2 (LCSRON-2) (NS Mayport, FL) ====
- USS Wichita (LCS-13)
- USS Billings (LCS-15)
- USS Indianapolis (LCS-17)
- USS St. Louis (LCS-19)
- USS Minneapolis-Saint Paul (LCS-21)
- USS Cooperstown (LCS-23)
- USS Marinette (LCS-25)
- USS Nantucket (LCS-27)
- USS Beloit (LCS-29)

==== Submarine Squadron 6 (SUBRON-6) (NS Norfolk, VA) ====
- USS Pasadena (SSN-752)
- USS New Hampshire (SSN-778)
- USS New Mexico (SSN-779)

Submarine Squadron 8 (SUBRON-8) (NS Norfolk, VA)

- USS Columbus (SSN-762)
- USS Boise (SSN-764)
- USS Montpelier (SSN-765)
- USS John Warner (SSN-785)
- USS New Jersey (SSN-796)

==== Submarine Squadron 4 (SUBRON-4) (NSB New London, CT) ====
- USS Virginia (SSN-774)
- USS South Dakota (SSN-790)
- USS Hyman G. Rickover (SSN-795)
- USS Iowa (SSN-797)

==== Submarine Development Squadron 12 (SUBDEVRON-12) (NSB New London, CT) ====
- USS Newport News (SSN-750)
- USS Hartford (SSN-768)
- USS Texas (SSN-775)
- USS California (SSN-781)
- USS Delaware (SSN-791)

==== Submarine Squadron 16 (SUBRON 16) (NSB Kings Bay, GA) ====
- USS Florida (SSGN-728)
- USS Georgia (SSGN-729)

==== Submarine Squadron 20 (SUBRON 20) (NSB Kings Bay, GA) ====
- USS Alaska (SSBN-732)
- USS Tennessee (SSBN-734)
- USS West Virginia (SSBN-736)
- USS Maryland (SSBN-738)
- USS Rhode Island (SSBN-740)
- USS Wyoming (SSBN-742)

==== Patrol and Reconnaissance Wing 11 (PATWING-11) (NAS Jacksonville, FL) ====
- Patrol Squadron 5 (VP-5)
- Patrol Squadron 8 (VP-8)
- Patrol Squadron 10 (VP-10)
- Patrol Squadron 16 (VP-16)
- Patrol Squadron 26 (VP-26)
- Patrol Squadron 45 (VP-45)
- Unmanned Patrol Squadron 19 (VUP-19) (Detachment NAS Point Mugu, CA)

==== Strategic Communications Wing 1 (STRACOMWING-1) (Tinker AFB, OK) ====
- Fleet Air Reconnaissance Squadron 3 (VQ-3) (Detachments Travis AFB, CA; Offutt AFB, NE)
- Fleet Air Reconnaissance Squadron 4 (VQ-4) (Detachment NAS Patuxent River, MD)

=== United States Sixth Fleet (NSA Naples, Italy) ===
- USS Mount Whitney (LCC-20) (NATO Base Gaeta, Italy)

==== Destroyer Squadron 60 (DESRON-60) (NS Rota, Spain) ====
- USS Roosevelt (DDG-80) (since 2020)
- USS Arleigh Burke (DDG-51) (since 2021)
- USS Bulkeley (DDG-84) (since 2022)
- USS Paul Ignatius (DDG-117) (since 2022)
- USS Oscar Austin (DDG-79) (since 2024)

=== United States Fifth Fleet (NSA Bahrain, Bahrain) ===
==== Commander Naval Surface Squadron 5 (CNSS-5) (NSA Bahrain, Bahrain) ====
- USS Tempest (PC-2) SHIP DECOMMISSIONED 2022
- USS Hurricane (PC-3) SHIP DECOMMISSIONED 2023
- USS Monsoon (PC-4) SHIP DECOMMISSIONED 2023
- USS Typhoon (PC-5) SHIP DECOMMISSIONED 2022
- USS Sirocco (PC-6) SHIP DECOMMISSIONED 2023
- USS Squall (PC-7) SHIP DECOMMISSIONED 2022
- USS Chinook (PC-9) SHIP DECOMMISSIONED 2023
- USS Firebolt (PC-10) SHIP DECOMMISSIONED 2022
- USS Whirlwind (PC-11) SHIP DECOMMISSIONED 2022
- USS Thunderbolt (PC-12) SHIP DECOMMISSIONED 2023
- USS Sentry (MCM-3) SHIP DECOMMISSIONED 2025
- USS Devastator (MCM-6) SHIP DECOMMISSIONED 2025
- USS Gladiator (MCM-11) SHIP DECOMMISSIONED 2025
- USS Dexterous (MCM-13) SHIP DECOMMISSIONED 2025

== U.S. Fleet Cyber Command (Fort George G. Meade, MD) ==
=== United States Tenth Fleet ===
- Commander, Naval Network Warfare Command (NNWC)
- Commanding Officer, Navy Cyber Defense Operations Command (NCDOC)
- Commanding Officer, Naval Information Operation Commands (NIOC)
  - NIOC Suitland (Research, Development, Test & Evaluation)
- Combined Task Forces (CTF)

== Naval Special Warfare Command (NAB Coronado, CA) ==
- Naval Special Warfare Development Group
- Naval Special Warfare Group One
  - SEAL Teams One, Three, Five and Seven
- Naval Special Warfare Group Two (NAB Little Creek, VA)
  - SEAL Teams Two, Four, Eight, and Ten
- Naval Special Warfare Group 3
  - SDV Teams One and Two
- Naval Special Warfare Group Four
  - Special Boat Team 12 (NAB Coronado, CA)
  - Special Boat Team 20 (NAB Little Creek, VA)
  - Special Boat Team 22 (John C. Stennis Space Center, MS)
- Naval Special Warfare Group 11
  - SEAL Teams Seventeen and Eighteen

== Naval Network Warfare Command ==
- Naval Information Operations Command (Formerly known as the Naval Security Group)
  - Naval Information Operations Detachment Fort Meade
- Naval Computer and Telecommunications Area Master Station Atlantic
  - Naval Computer and Telecommunications Station Naples
  - Naval Computer and Telecommunications Station Sicily
  - Naval Computer and Telecommunications Station Bahrain
  - Naval Computer and Telecommunications Area Master Station Atlantic Detachment Hampton Roads
  - Naval Computer and Telecommunications Area Master Station Atlantic Detachment LaMoure
  - Naval Computer and Telecommunications Area Master Station Atlantic Detachment Rota
  - Naval Computer and Telecommunications Area Master Station Atlantic Detachment Souda Bay
- Naval Computer and Telecommunications Area Master Station Pacific
  - Naval Computer and Telecommunications Station Guam
  - Naval Computer and Telecommunications Station Far East
- Naval Space Operations Command

== Naval Reserve Force (NSA Hampton Roads, VA) ==
- Naval Air Force Reserve
  - Fleet Logistics Support Wing
    - Fleet Logistics Support Squadron 1 (VR-1) (NAF Washington, MD)
    - Fleet Logistics Support Squadron 51 (VR-51) (MCAS Kaneohe Bay, HI)
    - Fleet Logistics Support Squadron 53 (VR-53) (NAF Washington, MD)
    - Fleet Logistics Support Squadron 54 (VR-54) (NAS JRB New Orleans, LA)
    - Fleet Logistics Support Squadron 55 (VR-55) (NAS Point Mugu, CA)
    - Fleet Logistics Support Squadron 56 (VR-56) (NAS Oceana, VA)
    - Fleet Logistics Support Squadron 57 (VR-57) (NAS North Island, CA)
    - Fleet Logistics Support Squadron 58 (VR-58) (NAS Jacksonville, FL)
    - Fleet Logistics Support Squadron 59 (VR-59) (NAS JRB Fort Worth, TX)
    - Fleet Logistics Support Squadron 61 (VR-61) (NAS Whidbey Island, WA)
    - Fleet Logistics Support Squadron 62 (VR-62) (NAS Jacksonville, FL)
    - Fleet Logistics Support Squadron 62 (VR-64) (NAES Lakehurst, NJ)
  - Tactical Support Wing (TSW) (NAS JRB Fort Worth, TX)
    - Strike Fighter Squadron 204 (VFA-204) (NAS JRB New Orleans, LA)
    - Electronic Attack Squadron 209 (VAQ-209) (NAS Whidbey Island, WA)
    - Fighter Squadron Composite 12 (VFC-12) (NAS Oceana, VA)
    - Fighter Squadron Composite 13 (VFC-13) (NAS Fallon, NV)
    - Fighter Squadron Composite 111 (VFC-111) (NAS Key West, FL)

== Operational Test and Evaluation Force ==
See Operational Test and Evaluation Force (OPTEVFOR)

== Disbandments ==
- Helicopter Wing Reserve (disbanded 31 May 2007, per OPNAV 3111.214, issued 22 May 2006)
- Reserve Patrol Wing (disbanded 30 June 2007 as per OPNAV 3111.204, issued 6 April 2006 with Patrol Squadrons reassigned or disbanded)
- VP 65, VP 66, and VP 94 disbanded per OPNAV 3111.454, 29 Nov 2005)
