= USS Billings =

Freedom-class littoral combat ship of the US Navy

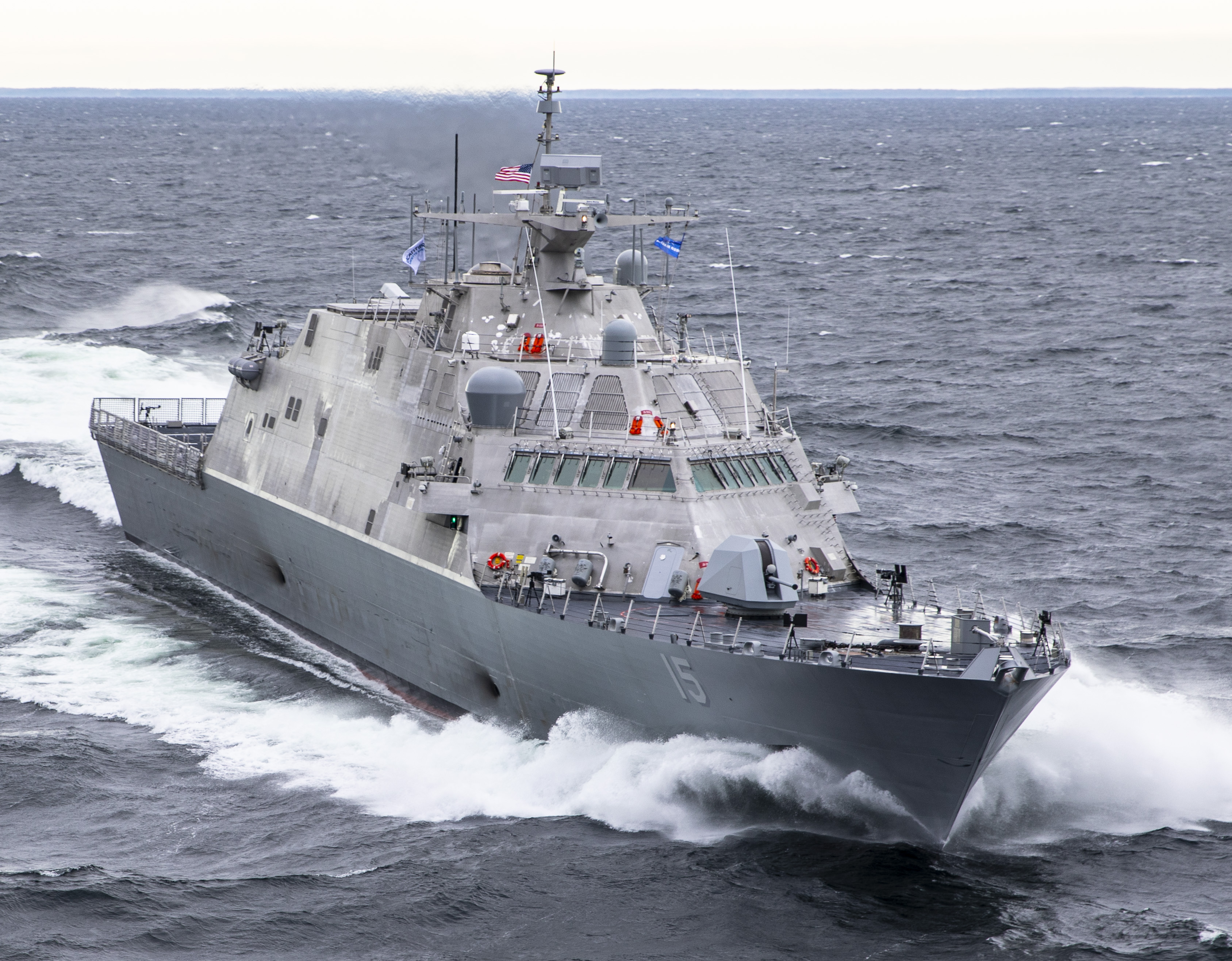
- USS Billings conducting trials on Lake Michigan on 6 December 2018

History

United States
- Name: Billings
- Namesake: Billings
- Awarded: 29 December 2010
- Builder: Marinette Marine
- Laid down: 2 November 2015
- Launched: 1 July 2017
- Sponsored by: Sharla Tester
- Christened: 1 July 2017
- Acquired: 1 February 2019
- Commissioned: 3 August 2019
- Home port: Mayport
- Identification: MMSI number: 368926295; Hull number: LCS-15
- Motto: Big Sky Over Troubled Waters; Star Of The Big Ocean
- Status: Active
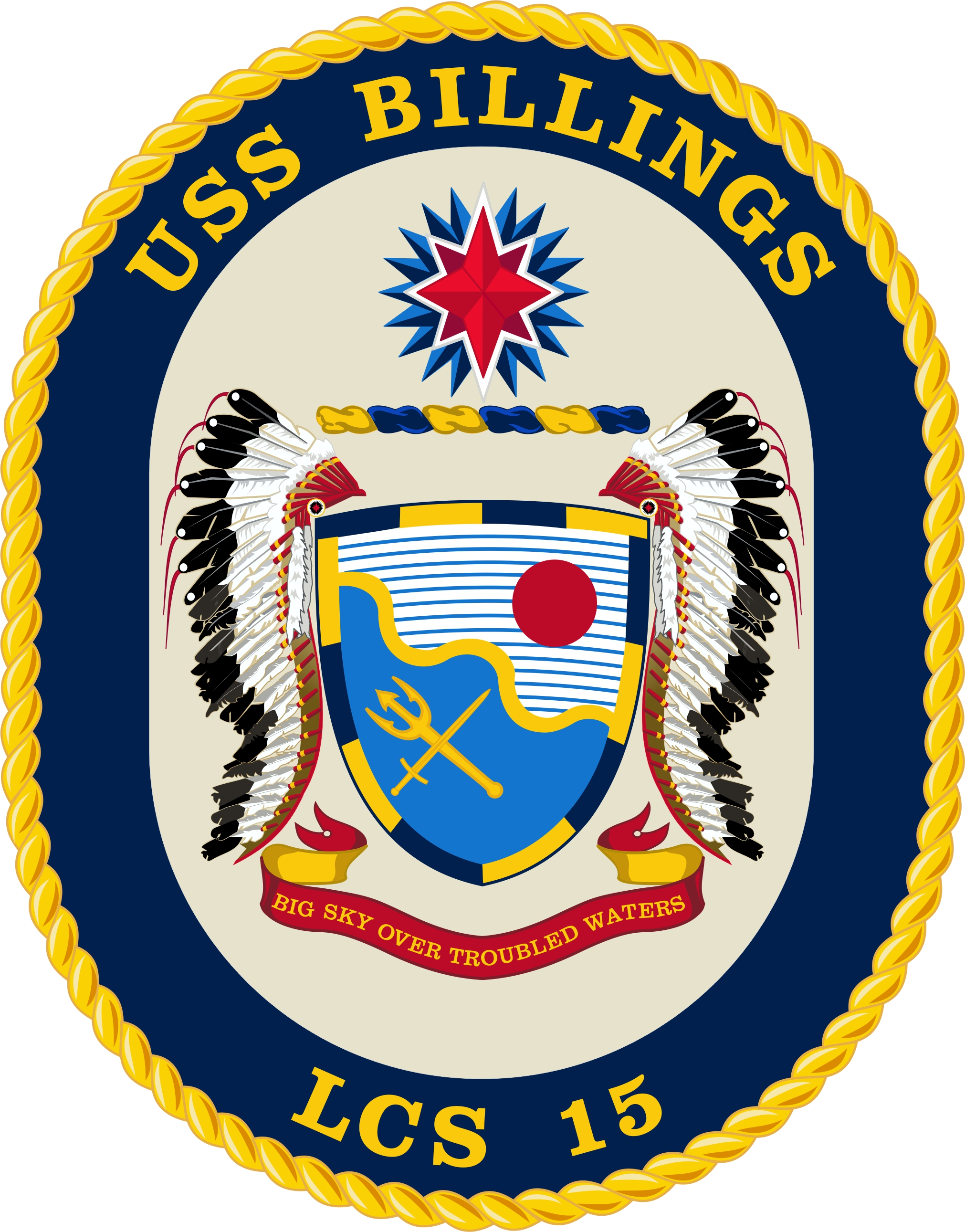
- Badge

General characteristics
- Class & type: Freedom-class littoral combat ship
- Displacement: 3,500 metric tons (3,900 short tons) full load
- Length: 378.3 ft (115.3 m)
- Beam: 57.4 ft (17.5 m)
- Draft: 13.0 ft (4.0 m)
- Propulsion: 2 Rolls-Royce MT30 36 MW gas turbines, 2 Colt-Pielstick diesel engines, 4 Rolls-Royce waterjets
- Speed: 45 knots (52 mph; 83 km/h) (sea state 3)
- Range: 3,500 nmi (6,500 km) at 18 knots (21 mph; 33 km/h)
- Endurance: 21 days (336 hours)
- Boats & landing craft carried: 11 m RHIB, 40 ft (12 m) high-speed boats
- Complement: 15 to 50 core crew, 75 mission crew (Blue and Gold crews)
- Armament: BAE Systems Mk 110 57 mm gun; RIM-116 Rolling Airframe Missiles; Honeywell Mk 50 Torpedo; NETFIRES PAM missile in the ASuW module; 2 .50 cal (12.7 mm) guns; can be fitted with up to 4 Bushmaster 30 mm guns
- Aircraft carried: 2 MH-60R/S Seahawks; MQ-8 Fire Scout
- Aviation facilities: Flight deck, hangar
- Notes: Electrical power is provided by 4 Isotta Fraschini V1708 diesel engines with Hitzinger generator units rated at 800 kW each.

USS Billings (LCS-15) is a Freedom-class littoral combat ship of the United States Navy. She is the first ship in naval service named after Billings, Montana.

== Design ==
In 2002, the U.S. Navy initiated a program to develop the first of a fleet of littoral combat ships. The Navy initially ordered two monohull ships from Lockheed Martin, which became known as the Freedom-class littoral combat ships after the first ship of the class, USS Freedom. Odd-numbered U.S. Navy littoral combat ships are built using the Freedom-class monohull design, while even-numbered ships are based on a competing design, the trimaran hull Independence-class littoral combat ship from General Dynamics. The initial order of littoral combat ships involved a total of four ships, including two of the Freedom-class design. Billings is the eighth Freedom-class littoral combat ship to be built.

Billings includes additional stability improvements over the original Freedom design; the stern transom was lengthened and buoyancy tanks were added to the stern to increase weight service and enhance stability. The ship will also feature automated sensors to allow "conditions-based maintenance" and reduce crew overwork and fatigue issues that Freedom had on her first deployment.

== Construction and career ==
Marinette Marine was awarded the contract to build the ship on 4 March 2013. Construction began on 20 October 2014 and she was launched on 1 July 2017. The ship was homeported to Naval Station Mayport, Florida and assigned to Littoral Combat Ship Squadron Two. In June 2019, Billings visited Cleveland, Ohio. Billings sustained damage after hitting Rosaire Desgagnes, a bulk cargo ship in Montreal, Quebec, Canada. The incident occurred on 24 June 2019. The vessel's starboard bridge wing was damaged as a result of the collision. Billings was officially commissioned in Key West, Florida on 3 August 2019.

On the 4 July 2021, a contingent of her crew visited their ship's namesake city to celebrate Independence Day. Later on the 10th of the same month, the ship together with the Dominican Republic Navy conducted a passing exercise (PASSEX). 24 August, Billings and Burlington were dispatched to support and provide relief to Haiti after a 7.2-magnitude earthquake that struck Haiti on 14 August. Mid Oct, 2025 Found her Moored to USS New Jersey ( BB62) in the Delaware river for Public display and celebration of the US Navy and Marines Birthdays.

== Gallery ==
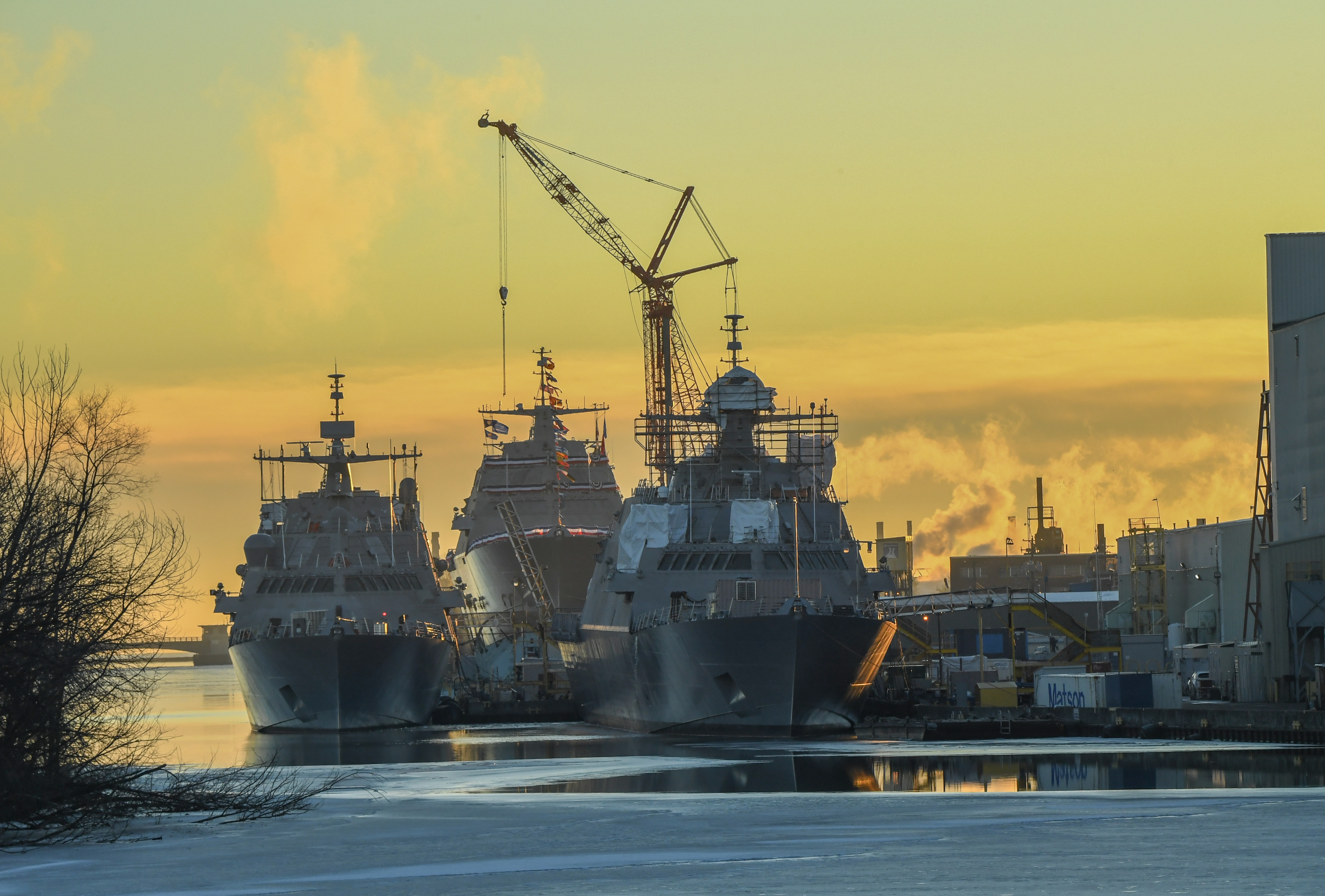
Billings, Indianapolis and St. Louis at the Marinette Marine shipyard on 15 December 2018

Billings launches sideways into the Menominee River in Marinette, Wisconsin on 1 July 2017
