= USS Cleveland (LCS-31) =

Littoral combat ship of the United States Navy

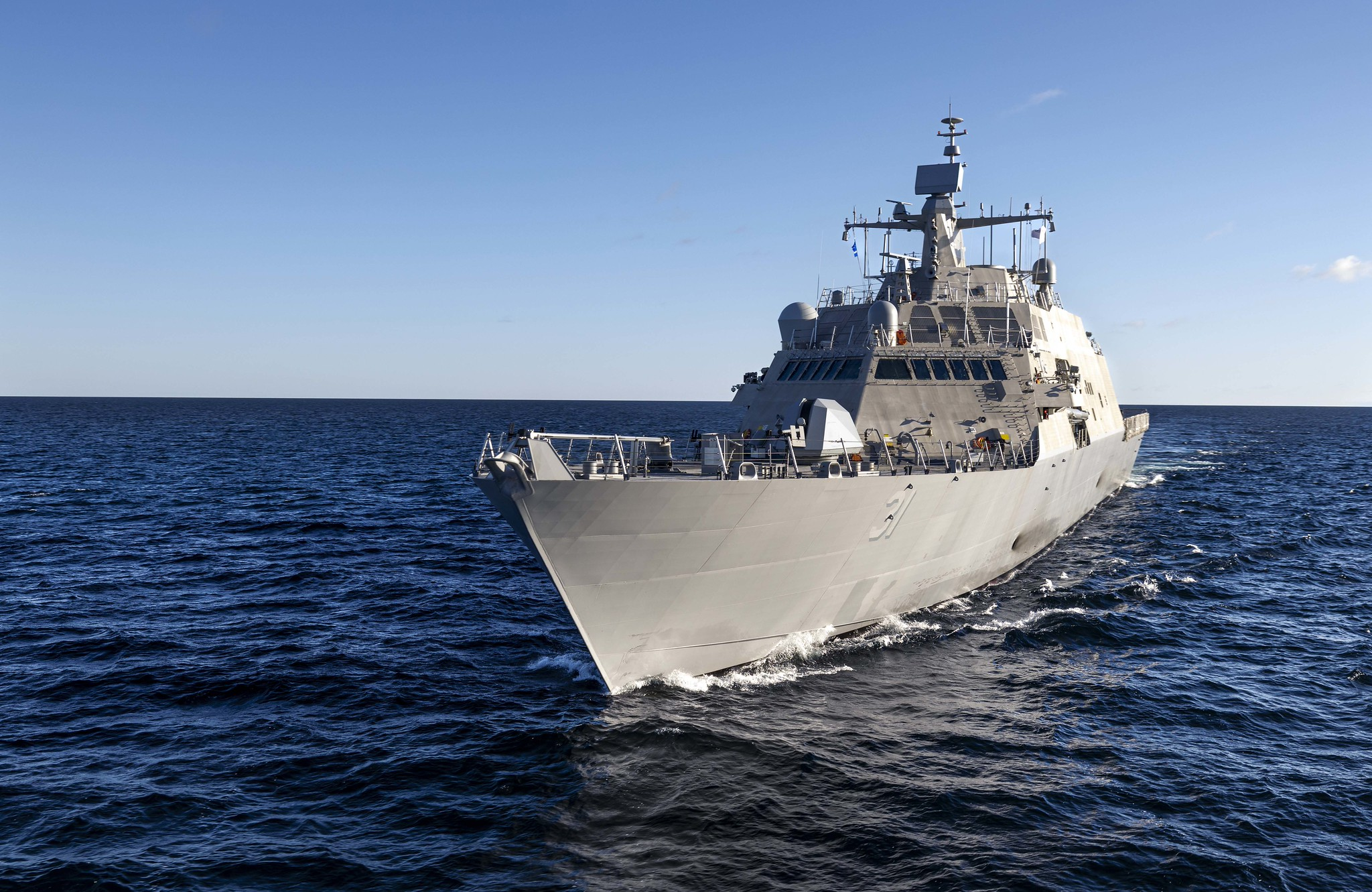
- USS Cleveland underway in November 2025

History

United States
- Name: Cleveland
- Namesake: City of Cleveland
- Awarded: 15 January 2019
- Builder: Marinette Marine
- Laid down: 16 June 2021
- Launched: 15 April 2023
- Sponsored by: Mrs. Robyn Modly
- Christened: 15 April 2023
- Acquired: 26 November 2025
- Commissioned: 16 May 2026
- Home port: Mayport, FL
- Identification: Hull number: LCS-31
- Motto: Forge a Legacy
- Status: In Active Service
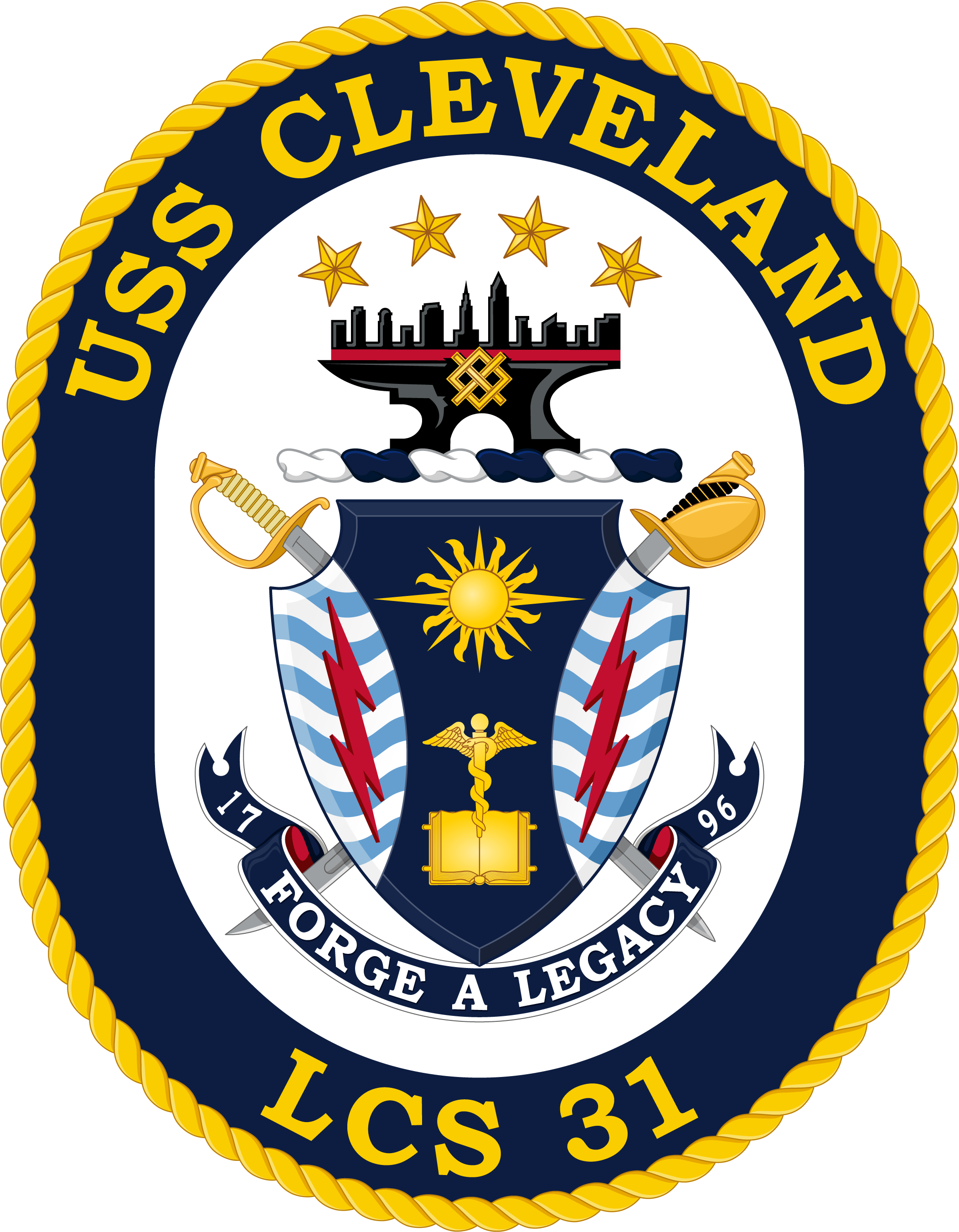
- Badge

General characteristics
- Class & type: Freedom-class littoral combat ship
- Displacement: 3,410 metric tons (3,760 short tons) full load
- Length: 388 ft (118 m)
- Beam: 58 ft (18 m)
- Draft: 14 ft (4.3 m)
- Speed: >48 knots (55 mph; 89 km/h)
- Complement: 9 officers, 41 enlisted

USS Cleveland (LCS-31) is a Freedom-class littoral combat ship of the United States Navy. She is the fourth commissioned ship in naval service named after Cleveland, the second-largest city in Ohio.

== Design and construction ==
In 2002, the U.S. Navy began a program to develop the first of a fleet of littoral combat ships. The Navy initially ordered two monohull ships from Lockheed Martin, which became known as the Freedom-class littoral combat ships after the first ship of the class, USS Freedom. Odd-numbered U.S. Navy littoral combat ships are constructed using the Freedom-class monohull design, while even-numbered ships are based on a competing design, the trimaran hull Independence-class littoral combat ship from General Dynamics. The initial order of littoral combat ships involved a total of four ships, including two of the Freedom-class design. Cleveland is the sixteenth and final Freedom-class littoral combat ship.

Marinette Marine was awarded the contract to construct the ship on 15 January 2019. Cleveland was launched on 15 April 2023. In a sideways launch, Cleveland was involved in a minor collision with a tugboat. No injuries were reported, and damage to Cleveland was "limited" and above the waterline. The shipyard intends to use a shiplift to transfer future ships to the water in a more controlled manner.

== Commissioning ==
The ship was formally commissioned into U.S. Navy in Cleveland harbor on 16 May 2026. There have been 81 ships in the history of the U.S. Navy that have been named after cities in Ohio itself, but the Cleveland was the first to be commissioned in its namesake city.

== See also ==
- Sideways launch of LCS-15 at Marinette Marine (video)
