= MV Maersk Tigris =

Container ship built in 2014

History
- Name: Maersk Ganges
- Owner: Wide Golf Ltd
- Operator: Rickmers Shipmanagement
- Port of registry: Marshall Islands
- Completed: 2014
- Identification: IMO number: 9694581; MMSI number: 538005749; Callsign: V7GQ7
- Status: In service

General characteristics
- Tonnage: 51,872 GT; 65,223 DWT
- Length: 255 metres (837 ft)
- Beam: 37 metres (121 ft)

MV Maersk Ganges is a Marshall Islands-registered container ship. Completed in 2014, the ship is 255 metres (837 ft) long, 37 metres (121 ft) wide with a gross tonnage of 51,872.

== 2015 seizure ==
On 28 April 2015, the Iranian Revolutionary Guard Corps Navy intercepted and seized the ship, then sailing as Maersk Tigris, while it was transiting through Iranian territorial waters via the Strait of Hormuz. An initial instruction by the IRGC Navy to the Maersk Tigris to proceed further into Iranian territorial waters was not complied with, after which the Iranian Navy fired a warning shot across the bridge of the ship. The ship was then taken into Iranian custody. Given that the vessel is flagged under the Marshall Islands, which the United States bears security responsibility for, the U.S. Navy dispatched the destroyer USS Farragut after receiving a distress call from the Maersk Tigris.

The vessel's charterer, the Danish shipping company Maersk, said Iran's seizure of a commercial vessel engaged in innocent passage through Iran's territorial waters in the internationally recognized shipping lane of the Strait of Hormuz was illegal. Maersk said it presumed the ship was detained because of an ongoing court case between Maersk Line and an Iranian company, but that Iran erred not only by failing to engage in normal protocol for arresting a ship, but by seizing property and personnel that do not belong to Maersk. The ship is chartered by Maersk Line and Maersk owns the ship's containers, but the ship itself is owned by Wide Golf Ltd, registered in Luxembourg, and is managed by Singapore-based Rickmers Shipmanagement.

On 29 April 2015, Maersk said it had been informed by the Iranian Ports and Maritime Organization that an Iranian court had ordered it to pay $3.6 million in compensation to an Iranian company for the loss of 10 of its containers Maersk Line had shipped to Dubai in January 2005. In February 2015, an appeals court in Tehran ordered Maersk Line to pay the Iranian company $163,000. The Iranian company then appealed the case, seeking more money, which led to the $3.6 million judgment. Maersk said it had only learned on April 30 of the Iranian appeals court $3.6 million ruling, but that it had "not received any written or formal confirmation that the seizure and the cargo case are connected.

According to maritime consultant William Watson, when an entity has a financial claim against a vessel's owners, the claimant can arrest the vessel when it is in port or at anchor. But in his decades in the maritime industry, he had never seen such a seizure carried on open seas.

On 7 May 2015, Iran released the Maersk Tigris.
