= USS Farragut (DDG-99) =

American Arleigh Burke-class destroyer

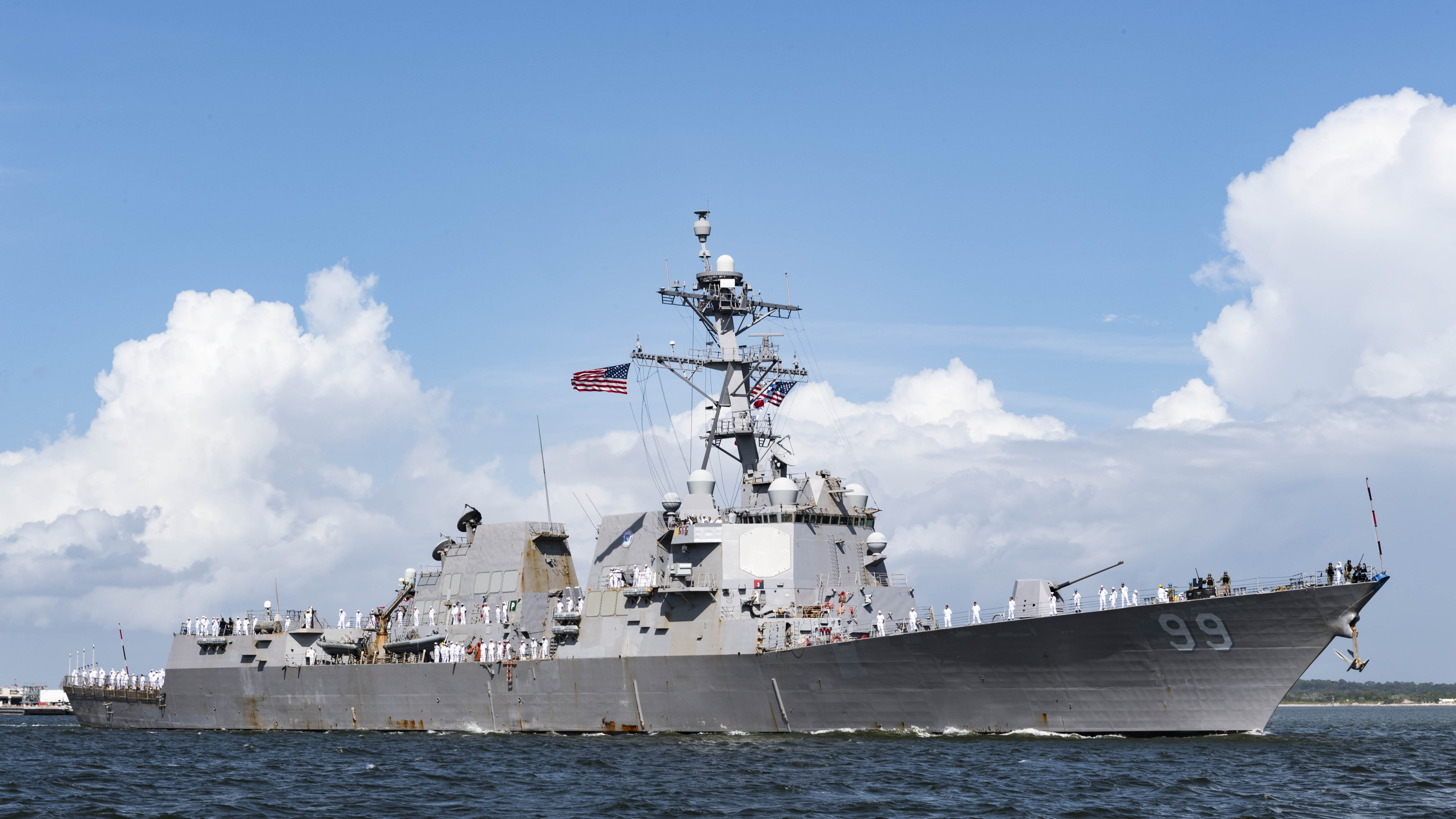
- USS Farragut on 14 September 2019

History

United States
- Name: Farragut
- Namesake: David Farragut
- Ordered: 6 March 1998
- Builder: Bath Iron Works
- Laid down: 9 January 2004
- Launched: 23 July 2005
- Sponsored by: Susan Collins
- Commissioned: 10 June 2006
- Home port: Mayport
- Identification: MMSI number: 369993000; Callsign: NFAR; Hull number: DDG-99
- Motto: Prepared for Battle
- Honors and awards: See Awards
- Status: in active service
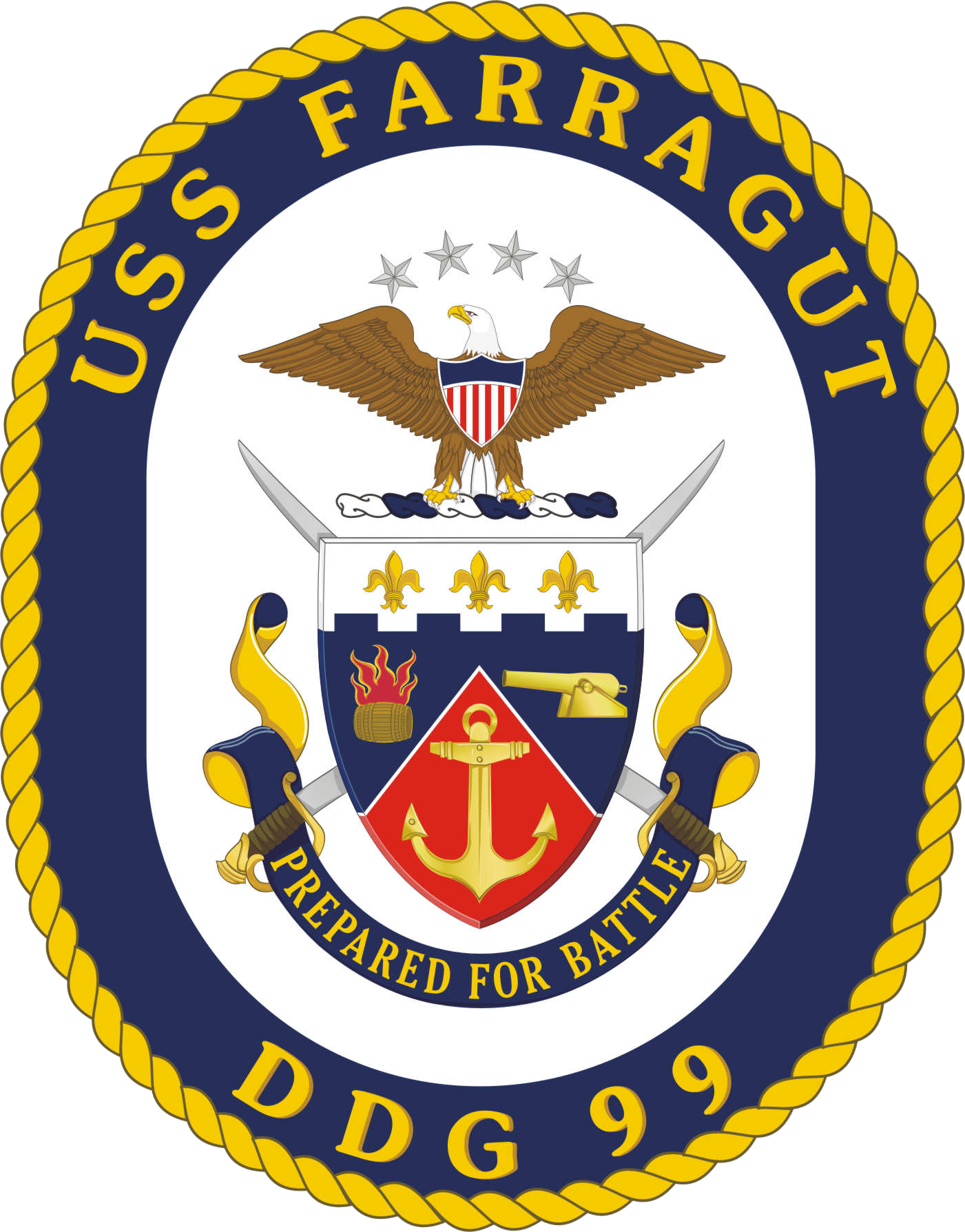
- Badge

General characteristics
- Class & type: Arleigh Burke-class destroyer
- Displacement: 9,200 tons
- Length: 509 ft 6 in (155.30 m)
- Beam: 66 ft (20 m)
- Draft: 31 ft (9.4 m)
- Propulsion: 4 × General Electric LM2500-30 gas turbines, 2 shafts, 100,000 shp (75,000 kW)
- Speed: 30+ knots (56+ km/h)
- Complement: 290 officers and enlisted
- Armament: Guns: 1 × 5-inch (127 mm)/62 Mk 45 Mod 4 (lightweight gun); 1 × 20 mm (0.8 in) Phalanx CIWS; 2 × 25 mm (0.98 in) Mk 38 machine gun system; 4 × 0.50 in (12.7 mm) caliber guns; Missiles: 1 × 32-cell, 1 × 64-cell (96 total cells) Mk 41 vertical launching system (VLS): RIM-66M surface-to-air missile; RIM-156 surface-to-air missile; RIM-174A Standard ERAM; RIM-161 anti-ballistic missile; RIM-162 ESSM (quad-packed); BGM-109 Tomahawk cruise missile; RUM-139 vertical launch ASROC; Torpedoes: 2 × Mark 32 triple torpedo tubes: Mark 46 lightweight torpedo; Mark 50 lightweight torpedo; Mark 54 lightweight torpedo
- Aircraft carried: 2 × MH-60R Seahawk helicopters

USS Farragut (DDG-99) is an Arleigh Burke-class (Flight IIA) Aegis guided missile destroyer in the United States Navy. She is the fifth Navy ship named for Admiral David Farragut (1801–1870). Farragut's keel was laid down on 9 January 2004 at the Bath Iron Works in Bath, Maine. She was christened on 23 July 2005, with Senator Susan Collins of Maine as her sponsor. Farragut was commissioned on 10 June 2006 in Mayport, Florida.

Farragut is equipped with the "Smart Ship" data distribution and control system.

== Deployments and ship history ==
Farragut departed Naval Station Mayport for her maiden deployment on 7 April 2008 in support of the Partnership of the Americas 2008 (POA 08). She returned home after six months on 5 October 2008.

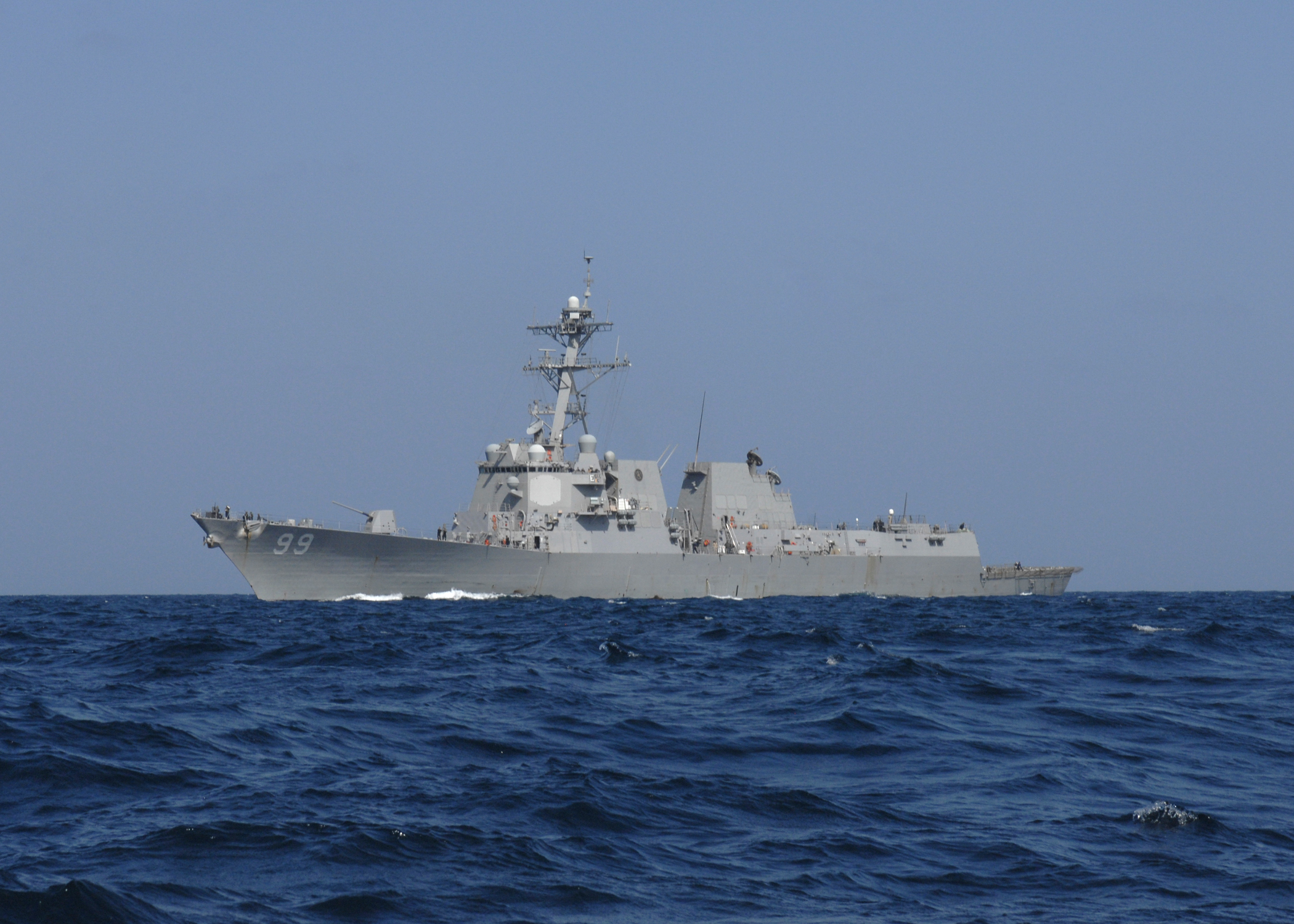
USS Farragut in the Gulf of Aden, 1 February 2010.

Farragut departed Naval Station Mayport again in January 2010 for her second deployment, heading for the CENTCOM Area of Responsibility (AOR). After a quick transit through the Mediterranean Sea, she made her way south through the Suez Canal and into the Red Sea en route Djibouti, Djibouti to embark and become the flagship for Combined Task Force 151, the task force responsible for Counter-Piracy in the Gulf of Aden and Indian Ocean. Farragut then enjoyed a port visit to Port Victoria, Seychelles. After turning over the duties of CTF 151, Farragut enjoyed port visits to Salala, Oman and Manama, Bahrain, before rendezvousing with USS Dwight D. Eisenhower to assume shotgun duties for the aircraft carrier. Once complete with all tasking in CENTCOM, Farragut sailed back west through the Red Sea and the Mediterranean Sea to enjoy port visits in Santander, Spain and Lisbon, Portugal, before returning home to Naval Station Mayport in August 2010.

Farragut departed Naval Station Mayport once more in June 2012 for her third and latest deployment, to be spent in the Northern Atlantic Ocean, Mediterranean Sea, and CENTCOM AOR. Her first port visit was to Mahón, Menorca, where the officers and crew visited the Admiral David Farragut Memorial and participated in a ceremony honoring the ship's namesake. From there the ship traveled to Riga, Latvia; Tallinn, Estonia; Bodø, Norway; Severomorsk, Russia; Wilhelmshaven, Germany; and La Rochelle, France. During these port visits, Farragut welcomed over 50 foreign dignitaries on board for seven receptions, crew members provided numerous ship tours to hundreds of visitors, and Sailors took part in ten community relations projects. While in 6th Fleet, Farragut participated in exercises with the French, Italian, Norwegian, and Russian navies. She also embarked 15 foreign midshipmen and naval officers from Bulgaria, Georgia, Greece, Lithuania, and Sweden. When Farragut crossed the Arctic Circle on the way to her port visit in Russia, crew members participated in a very chilly, but memorable, Blue Nose ceremony on board. In the fall of 2012, Farragut transitioned to the 5th Fleet AOR and served with both the Dwight D. Eisenhower Carrier Strike Group and the USS John C. Stennis Carrier Strike Groups. Farragut again served as the Combined Task Force (CTF) 151 flagship and embarked 17 Officers and Sailors for 3 months. As the CTF 151 flagship, Farragut was responsible for providing maritime security against piracy and securing freedom of navigation to vessels in the Gulf of Oman, Gulf of Aden and Somali Basin. While serving in the 5th Fleet, Farragut made port visits to Manama, Bahrain; Jebel Ali, UAE; and Muscat, Oman. She also completed naval exercises with the Saudi Arabian, Russian, and Australian navies. In November 2012, Farragut participated in joint exercises in the Persian Gulf during which she embarked the Combined Task Force 55 staff and provided vital inputs to the development of new surface warfare tactics. Farragut's visit, board, search and seizure (VBSS) team conducted multiple training exercises, supported maritime interdiction operations, and completed rescue and assistance boardings of two vessels in distress. After Farragut departed the 5th Fleet, she made her final port visit to Bar, Montenegro. While in Bar, four "E's" were painted on the bridge wings to signify Farragut's selection for the 2012 Battle Efficiency Award and three Command Excellence Awards. These awards recognized the hard work and dedication displayed by Farragut's crew during the past year.

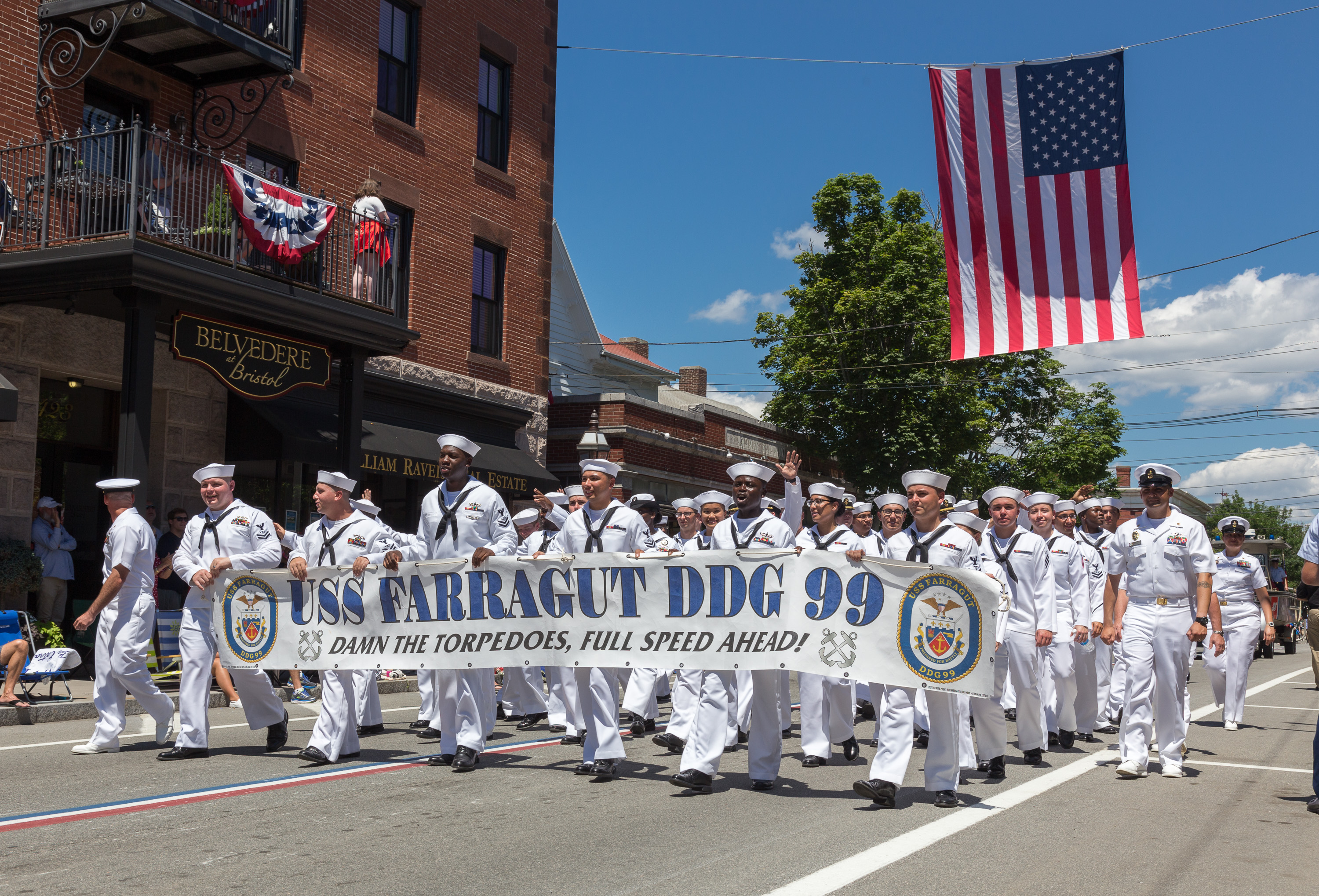
Crewmen of USS Farragut march in the 2017 Bristol Fourth of July Parade

Farragut left Mayport on 6 August 2022 for a deployment with the USS George H.W. Bush Carrier Strike Group.

Farragut, along with the "Valkyries" of HSM-50 Helicopter Maritime Strike Squadron (HSM) 50, deployed in September 2023 to support Joint Interagency Task Force-South's counter-narcotics operations in the Caribbean Sea. It returned to Mayport in February 2024.

== Engagements ==
On 21 February 2010, a SH-60B Seahawk helicopter from Farragut disrupted two attempts by Somali pirates to attack the Tanzanian vessel MV Barakaale 1. The helicopter then stopped the pirate skiff as it attempted to speed away, by firing warning shots across its bow. A Visit, Board, Search and Seizure (VBSS) team from Farragut boarded the vessel and the eight suspected pirates were taken aboard Farragut.

For the majority of her 2010 deployment the CENTCOM AOR, Farragut served as flagship of Combined Task Force 151 (CTF-151), on an anti-piracy mission. On 1 April 2010, three suspected pirate boats fired on a Sierra Leone flagged tanker, MV Evita, north-west of Seychelles. Evita was fired on, but managed to escape, in part by crew firing flares at their attackers. They reported the attack to CTF-151, and Farragut responded. After boarding the pirate skiffs, and moving the pirates to the smaller, less capable skiffs, Farragut destroyed the pirate "mother" skiff.

On 29 January 2013 Yemeni authorities working alongside Farragut intercepted a ship in the Arabian Sea carrying an illegal-arms cache. The cache included surface-to-air missiles, C-4 explosives, rocket propelled grenades and other weapons.

On 28 April 2015, Farragut responded to a distress call from MV Maersk Tigris, which was travelling through the Strait of Hormuz when she came under fire from an Iranian patrol boat.

On 14 January 2020, the Farragut and a Russian warship nearly collided with one another in the North Arabian Sea.

== Awards ==
- Navy Meritorious Unit Commendation - (Apr-Oct 2008, Oct 2011-Jul 2013, Apr-Dec 2018)
- Battle "E" - (2008, 2012, 2016, 2017, 2019)
- CNO Afloat Safety Award (LANTFLT) - (2010)
- Retention Excellence Award - (2018)
- Arctic Service Ribbon - (2018)
