= USS Nantucket (LCS-27) =

Freedom-class littoral combat ship of the United States Navy

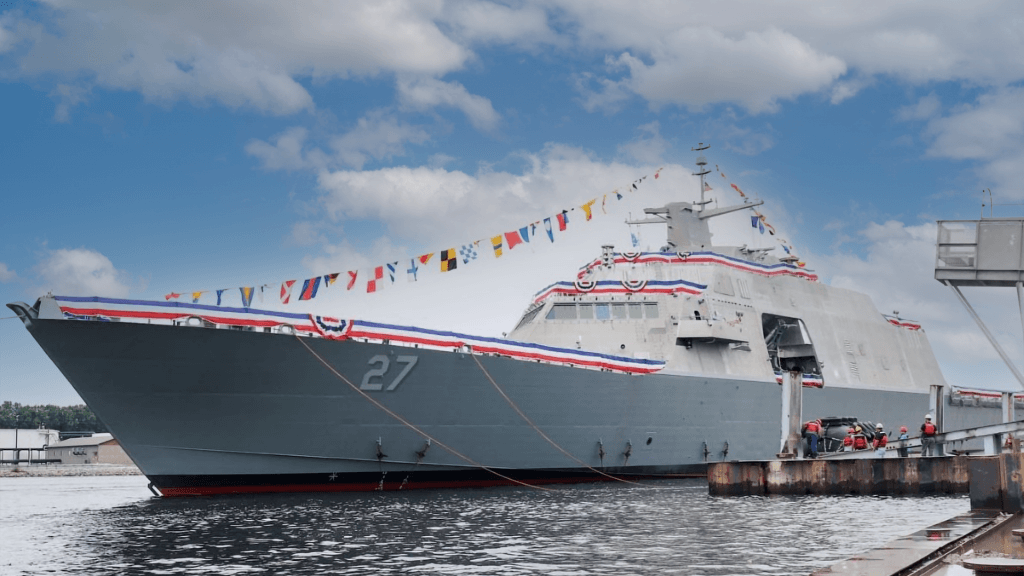
- Nantucket after launch

History

United States
- Name: Nantucket
- Namesake: Nantucket
- Awarded: 6 October 2017
- Builder: Marinette Marine
- Laid down: 9 October 2019
- Launched: 7 August 2021
- Sponsored by: Polly Spencer
- Christened: 7 August 2021
- Commissioned: 16 November 2024
- Home port: Mayport
- Identification: Hull number: LCS-27
- Motto: Dominae griseae maris; (Grey Lady of the Sea)
- Status: In active service
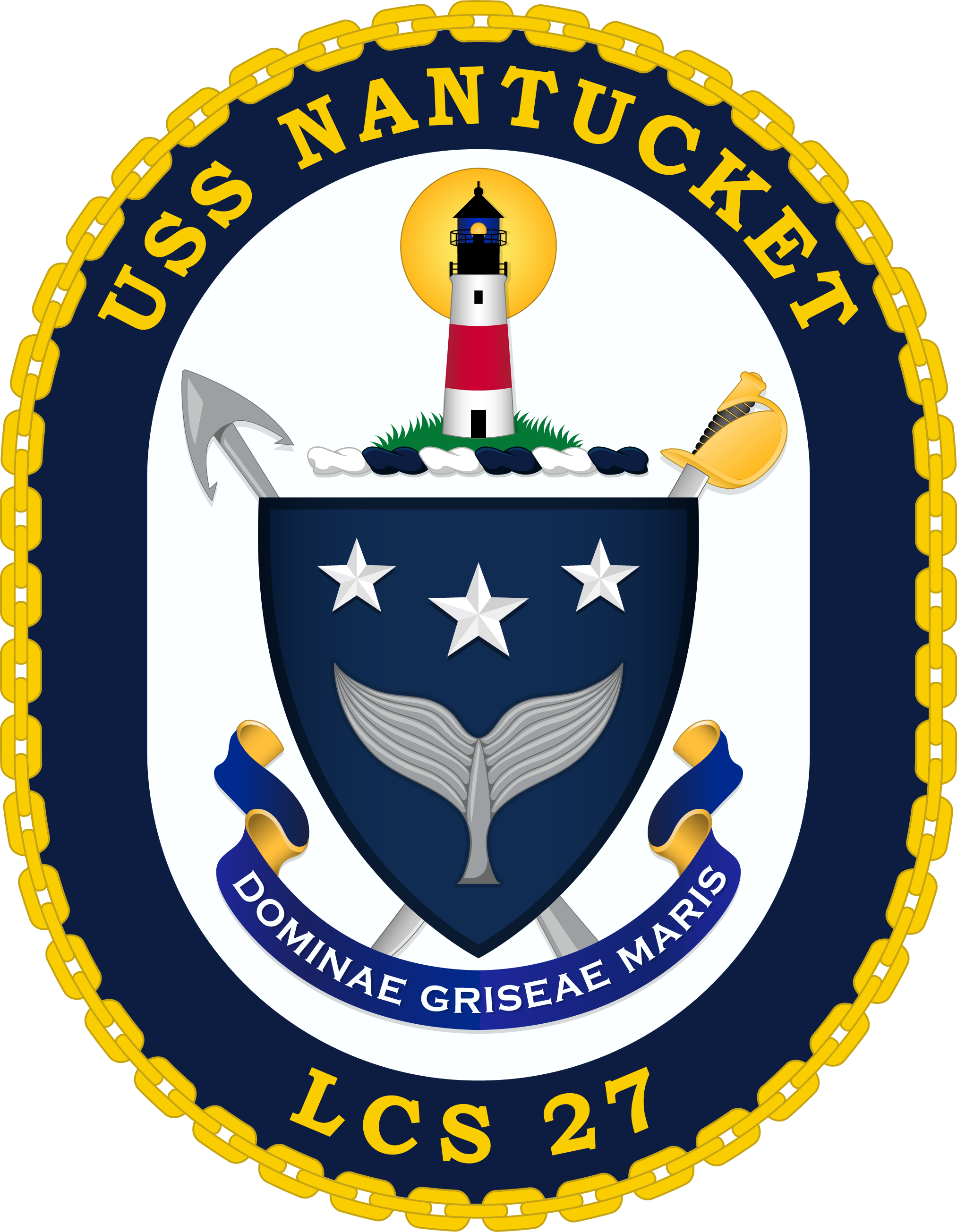
- Badge

General characteristics
- Class & type: Freedom-class littoral combat ship
- Length: 378 ft (115 m)
- Speed: >40 knots (46 mph; 74 km/h)

USS Nantucket (LCS-27) is a Freedom-class littoral combat ship of the United States Navy. She is the third commissioned ship in naval service named after Nantucket.

== Design ==
In 2002, the Navy initiated a program to develop the first of a fleet of littoral combat ships. The Navy initially ordered two monohull ships from Lockheed Martin, which became known as the Freedom-class littoral combat ships after the first ship of the class, USS Freedom. Odd-numbered U.S. Navy littoral combat ships are built using the Freedom-class monohull design, while even-numbered ships are based on a competing design, the trimaran hull Independence-class littoral combat ship from General Dynamics. The initial order of littoral combat ships involved a total of four ships, including two of the Freedom-class design. Nantucket is the 14th Freedom-class littoral combat ship to be built.

== Construction and career ==
Marinette Marine was awarded the contract to build the ship on 6 October 2017.

The ship was christened on 7 August 2021 and launched into the Menominee River. Her sponsor was Polly Spencer, wife of Richard V. Spencer, former Secretary of the Navy.

Nantucket was commissioned on 16 November 2024 at Charlestown Navy Yard in Boston. At the time it was commissioned, the ship's home port was identified as Naval Station Mayport near Jacksonville, Florida.

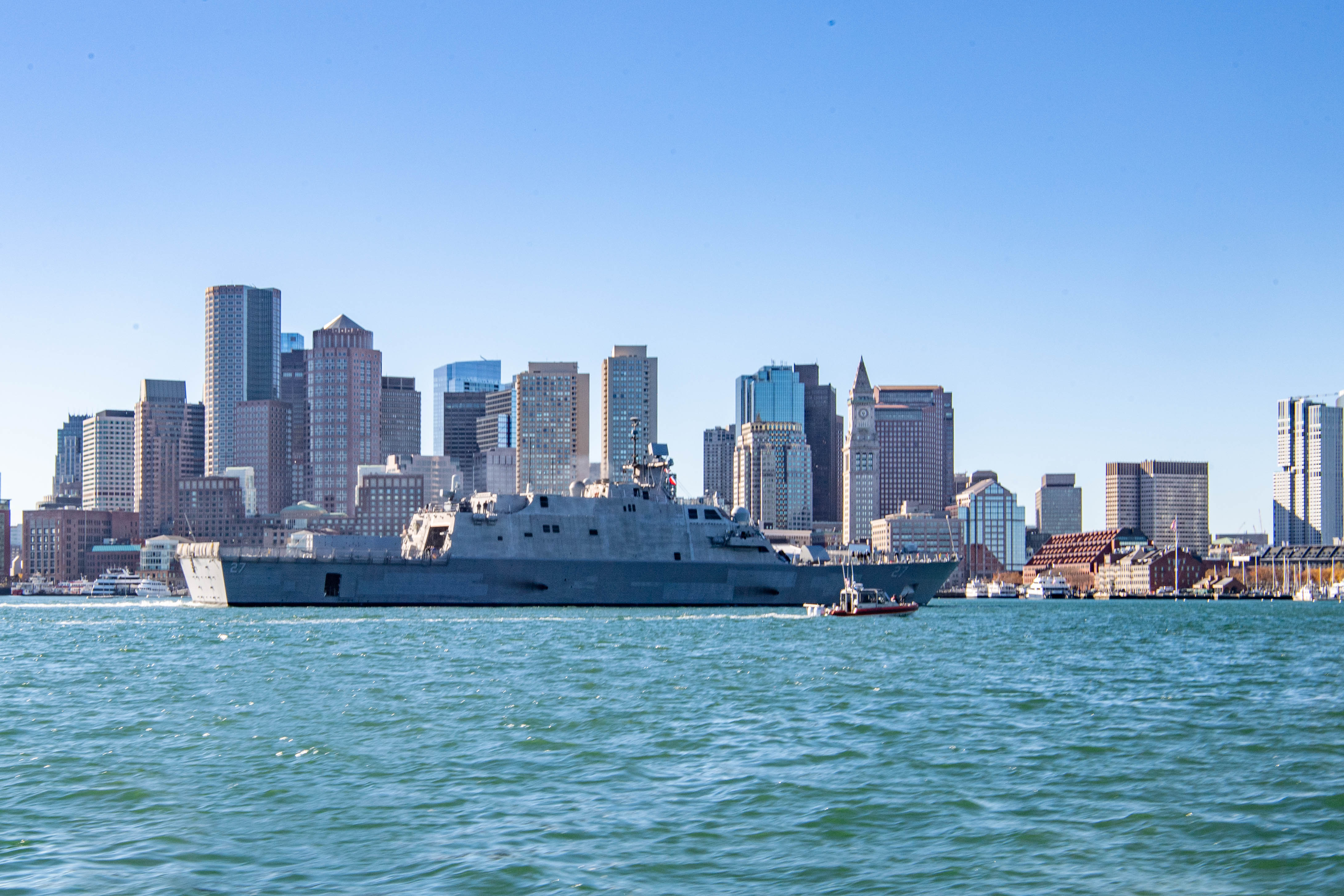
Nantucket arriving in Boston for commissioning in November 2024

== Sources ==
- The entry can be found here.
