= Naval Station Mayport =

Naval base in Florida, United States

- Admiral David L. McDonald Field
- Mayport, Florida in the United States
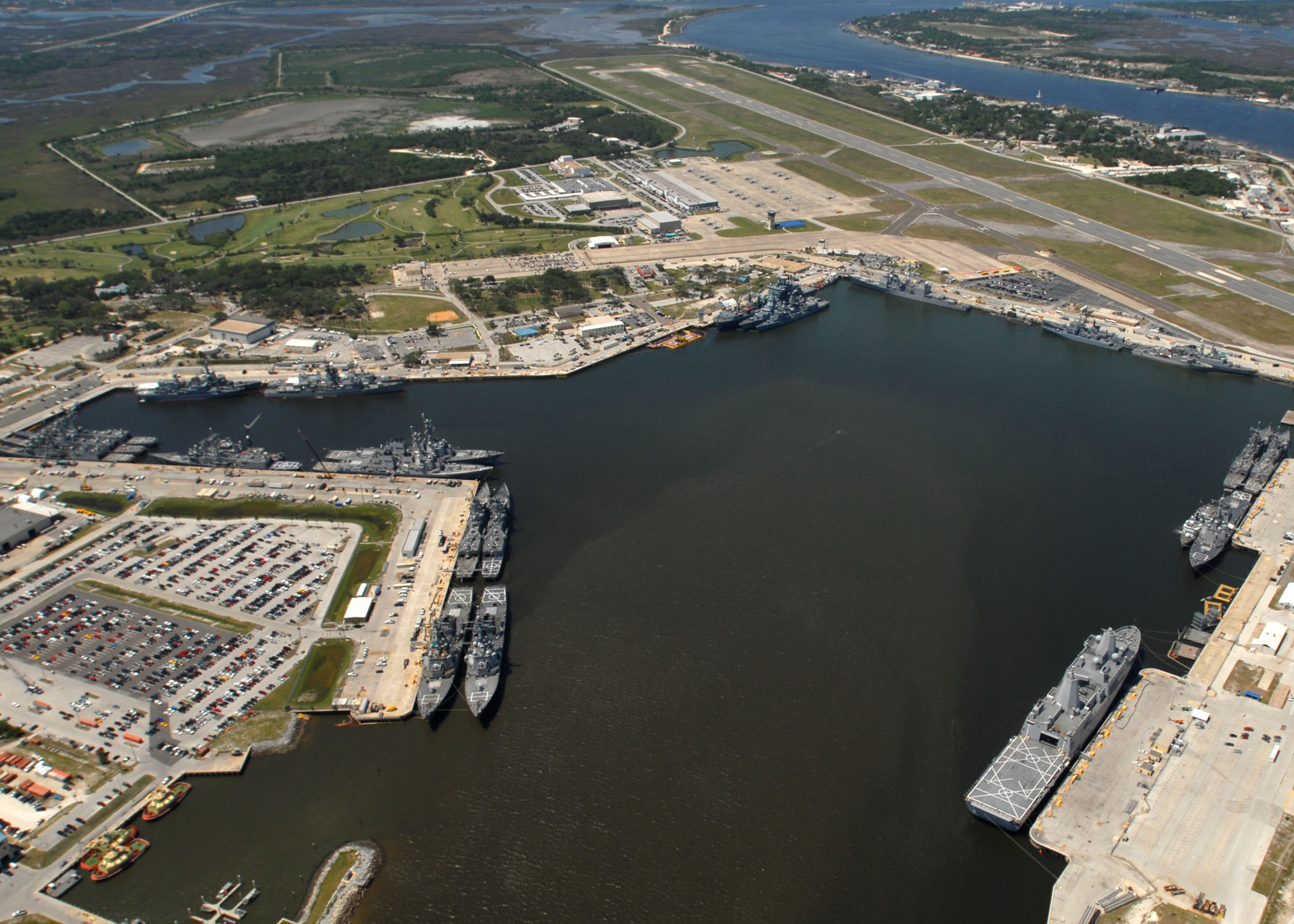
- Aerial view of NS Mayport during 2009

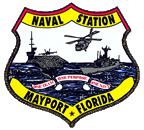

Site information
- Type: Naval Base and Naval Air Station
- Owner: Department of Defense
- Operator: US Navy
- Controlled by: Navy Region Southeast
- Condition: Operational
- Website: Official website

Location
- Location in the United States
- Coordinates: 30°23′31″N 81°25′25″W

Site history
- Built: 1939–1942
- In use: December 1942 – present

Garrison information
- Current commander: Captain Brian A. Binder
- Garrison: United States Fourth Fleet

Airfield information
- Identifiers: IATA: NRB, ICAO: KNRB, FAA LID: NRB, WMO: 722066
- Elevation: 15 ft (0 m) AMSL
Runways
Direction	Length and surface
5/23	8,001 ft (2,440 m) Asphalt
- Source: FAA, official site

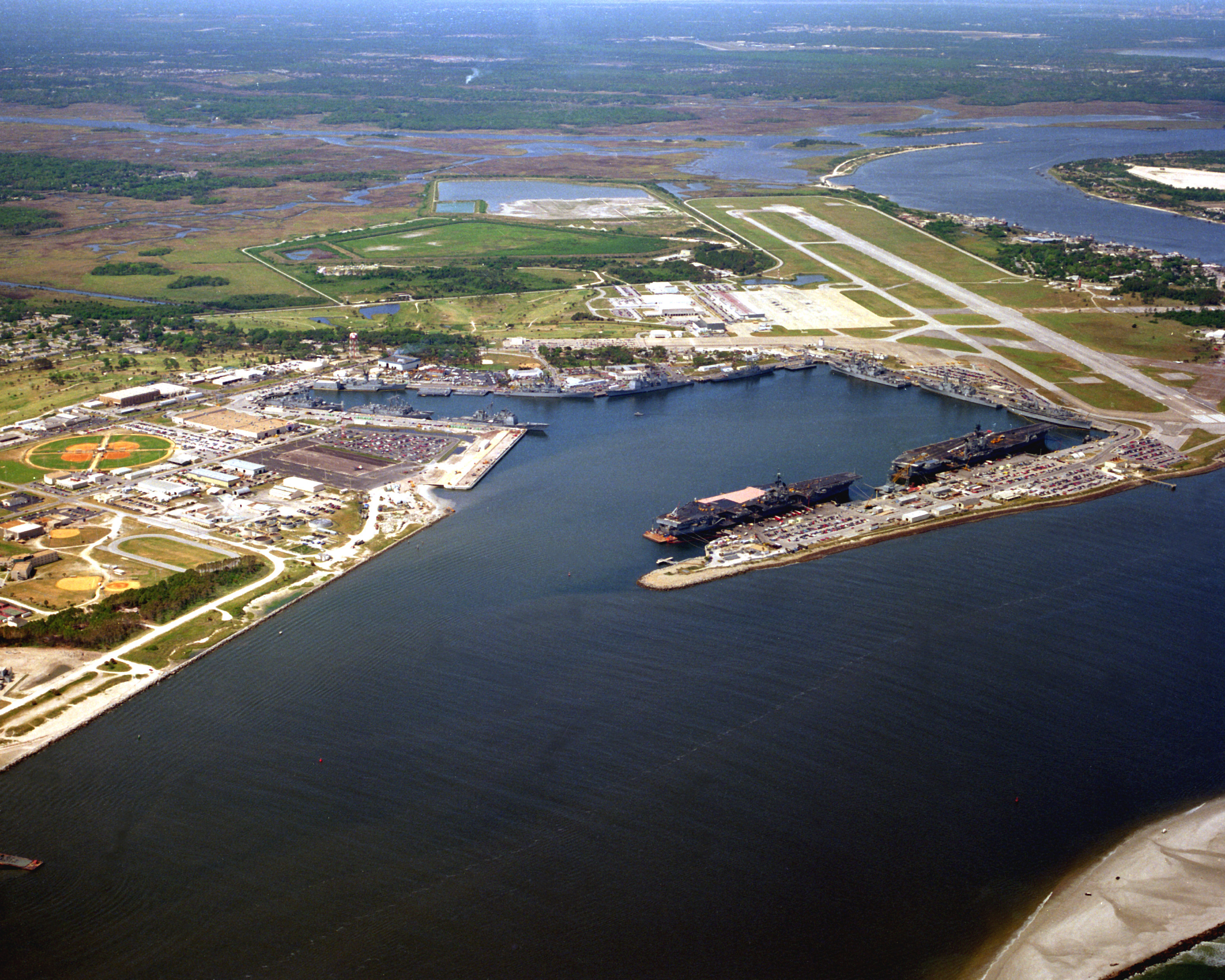
Aerial view of Naval Station Mayport in 1993 with Saratoga and Constellation undergoing maintenance.

Naval Station Mayport (IATA: NRB, ICAO: KNRB, FAA LID: NRB) is a major United States Navy base on San Pablo Island in Jacksonville, Florida. It contains a protected harbor that can accommodate aircraft carrier-size vessels, ship's intermediate maintenance activity (SIMA) and a military airfield (Admiral David L. McDonald Field) with one asphalt paved runway (5/23) measuring 8,001 ft × 200 ft (2,439 m × 61 m).

== Base history ==
Naval Station Mayport

The station was commissioned in December 1942. It was reclassified as a Sea Frontier base in 1943 almost certainly as part of the Gulf Sea Frontier, which covered Florida. A new naval auxiliary air station (NAAS) was established in April 1944. The naval section Base and the NAAS supported the Atlantic Fleet during World War II. Both were closed after the war. In June 1948, Mayport was reestablished as a naval outlying landing field. The base area was increased to 1,680 acres (680 ha) and the runway was extended in the mid 1950s.

USS Tarawa became the first capital ship to use the new aircraft carrier basin in October 1952. The Base was renamed back to a Naval Auxiliary Air Station in July 1955. The naval station was extended to accommodate more ships, sailors and their families and the airfield re-designated as a separate naval air station in 1988. As part of post-Cold War force reductions and staff consolidations, NAS Mayport was merged back into NS Mayport in 1992.

NS Mayport has grown to become the third-largest naval surface fleet concentration area in the United States. The station has a busy harbor capable of accommodating 34 ships and an 8,001-foot (2,439 m) runway capable of handling most aircraft in the Department of Defense inventory.

Naval Station Mayport is also home to the Navy's U.S. Naval Forces Southern Command / United States Fourth Fleet, reactivated in 2008 after being deactivated in 1950.

The base has historically served as the homeport to various conventionally powered aircraft carriers of the United States Atlantic Fleet, including Shangri-La (1960–1971), Franklin D. Roosevelt (1956–1977), Forrestal (1977–1993), Saratoga (1957–1994), and, most recently, John F. Kennedy (1995–2007). With the decommissioning of all conventionally-powered aircraft carriers by the U.S. Navy, no carriers are presently assigned to Mayport. However, both houses of Congress have passed legislation authorizing about US$75 million for dredging and upgrades at NAVSTA Mayport to accommodate a nuclear-powered aircraft carrier.

On 29 January 2010, the Quadrennial Defense Review Report stated that a nuclear aircraft carrier would be homeported at NS Mayport. The action will help protect the fleet against a potential terror attack, accident or natural disaster, because all east coast aircraft carriers are currently based at Naval Station Norfolk, Virginia, according to the report. West coast aircraft carriers are split between Naval Air Station North Island in San Diego, California, Naval Base Kitsap and Naval Station Everett in Washington state and one carrier assigned to the Forward Deployed Naval Force (FDNF) homeported at Naval Base Yokosuka, Japan.

In 2009, Robert Gates, Secretary of Defense, stated, "Having a single (nuclear carrier) homeport has not been considered acceptable on the west coast and should not be considered acceptable on the east coast." The decision was opposed by elected officials in Virginia, who would lose 3,500 sailors and their dependents, $425 million in revenue each year, and most importantly, 6,000 support jobs. The Hampton Roads Chamber of Commerce estimated the loss at 11,000 jobs and $650 million per year. Infrastructure changes and facility construction at Mayport were estimated to take five years and cost over half a billion dollars. The 2011 budget committed $590 million during the fiscal years from 2011 to 2019, so a carrier may not move to Mayport until 2019. An amphibious group was assigned sooner. The USS Iwo Jima Amphibious Ready Group (ARG), consisting of Iwo Jima, USS New York and USS Fort McHenry relocated to Mayport between December 2013 and August 2014.

The Virginia congressional delegation fought the loss of even one of Naval Station Norfolk's aircraft carriers boost to their economy by citing other areas such as shipbuilding to spend the Navy's tight budget.

On 5 September 2018, the Royal Navy's new aircraft carrier, HMS Queen Elizabeth and escort frigate HMS Monmouth, arrived at Mayport for resupplying, on her first deployment to the United States for "Westlant 18".

=== Littoral Combat Ship Squadron Two ===
A 2013 report from the Navy revealed that they are considering basing as many as 14 littoral combat ships at NS Mayport. Littoral Combat Ship Squadron Two (LCSRON2) was established at the base on 7 November 2014. All Freedom variant LCSs, with the exception of the Fort Worth are assigned to LCSRON2. Currently 10 LCSs are homeported in Mayport; Wichita, Billings, Indianapolis, St. Louis, Minneapolis-Saint Paul, Cooperstown, Marinette, Nantucket, Beloit, and Cleveland are assigned to the squadron.

=== Commander Naval Surface Group Southeast ===
Mayport had been the home of Destroyer Squadron 14 for years. On 31 July 2015, the squadron was merged with Cruiser-Destroyer Readiness Support Detachment Mayport to form Naval Surface Squadron Fourteen (NAVSURFRON14). In 2024, the SURFRON was renamed to Commander Naval Surface Group Southeast (CNSG-SE). This was to facilitate changes in the roles and responsibilities of the Commodore. Currently, the surface group (SURFGRU) consists of the destroyers Ramage, Carney, The Sullivans, Donald Cook, Lassen, Mason, Farragut, Jason Dunham, Thomas Hudner, Delbert D. Black, and John Basilone.

=== Iwo Jima Amphibious Ready Group ===
The Amphibious Ready Group is no longer based in Mayport. Iwo Jima shifted homeports to Naval Station Norfolk in December 2021, New York shifted in November 2021, and Fort McHenry was decommissioned in March 2021.

== Homeported ships ==
- Cutters (USCG) (1)
  - USCGC Valiant (WMEC-621)
- Destroyers (12)
  - USS Ramage (DDG-61)
  - USS Carney (DDG-64)
  - USS The Sullivans (DDG-68)
  - USS Donald Cook (DDG-75)
  - USS Winston S. Churchill (DDG-81)
  - USS Lassen (DDG-82)
  - USS Mason (DDG-87)
  - USS Farragut (DDG-99)
  - USS Jason Dunham (DDG-109)
  - USS Thomas Hudner (DDG-116)
  - USS Delbert D. Black (DDG-119)
  - USS John Basilone (DDG-122)
- Littoral combat ships (10)
  - USS Wichita (LCS-13)
  - USS Billings (LCS-15)
  - USS Indianapolis (LCS-17)
  - USS St. Louis (LCS-19)
  - USS Minneapolis-Saint Paul (LCS-21)
  - USS Cooperstown (LCS-23)
  - USS Marinette (LCS-25)
  - USS Nantucket (LCS-27)
  - USS Beloit (LCS-29)
  - USS Cleveland (LCS-31)|

== Adm David L. McDonald Field ==
On 1 April 1944, the air facility at Mayport was commissioned as Naval Auxiliary Air Station (NAAS) Mayport. Following World War II, the NAAS was decommissioned and placed in a caretaker status. The United States Coast Guard took over the base and operated a small "Boot Camp" there for several years, but they vacated Mayport in late 1947 due to budget cuts. Mayport was reactivated again in June 1948 as a Naval Outlying Landing Field under the cognizance of the Commanding Officer, Naval Air Station Jacksonville. As helicopter aviation evolved during the Cold War, Mayport became the East Coast home for the Light Airborne Multi-Purpose System (LAMPS) MK III squadrons. As a reflection of growth, Naval Air Facility Mayport was re-designated as a naval air station in 1988.

=== Aircraft wings and squadrons ===
Helicopter wing

- Helicopter Maritime Strike Wing, U.S. Atlantic Fleet

Helicopter squadrons

- HSM-40 "Airwolves"
- HSM-48 "Vipers"
- HSM-50 "Valkyries"

== See also ==
- List of United States Navy airfields
