= HSM-50 =

Helicopter Maritime Strike Squadron 50
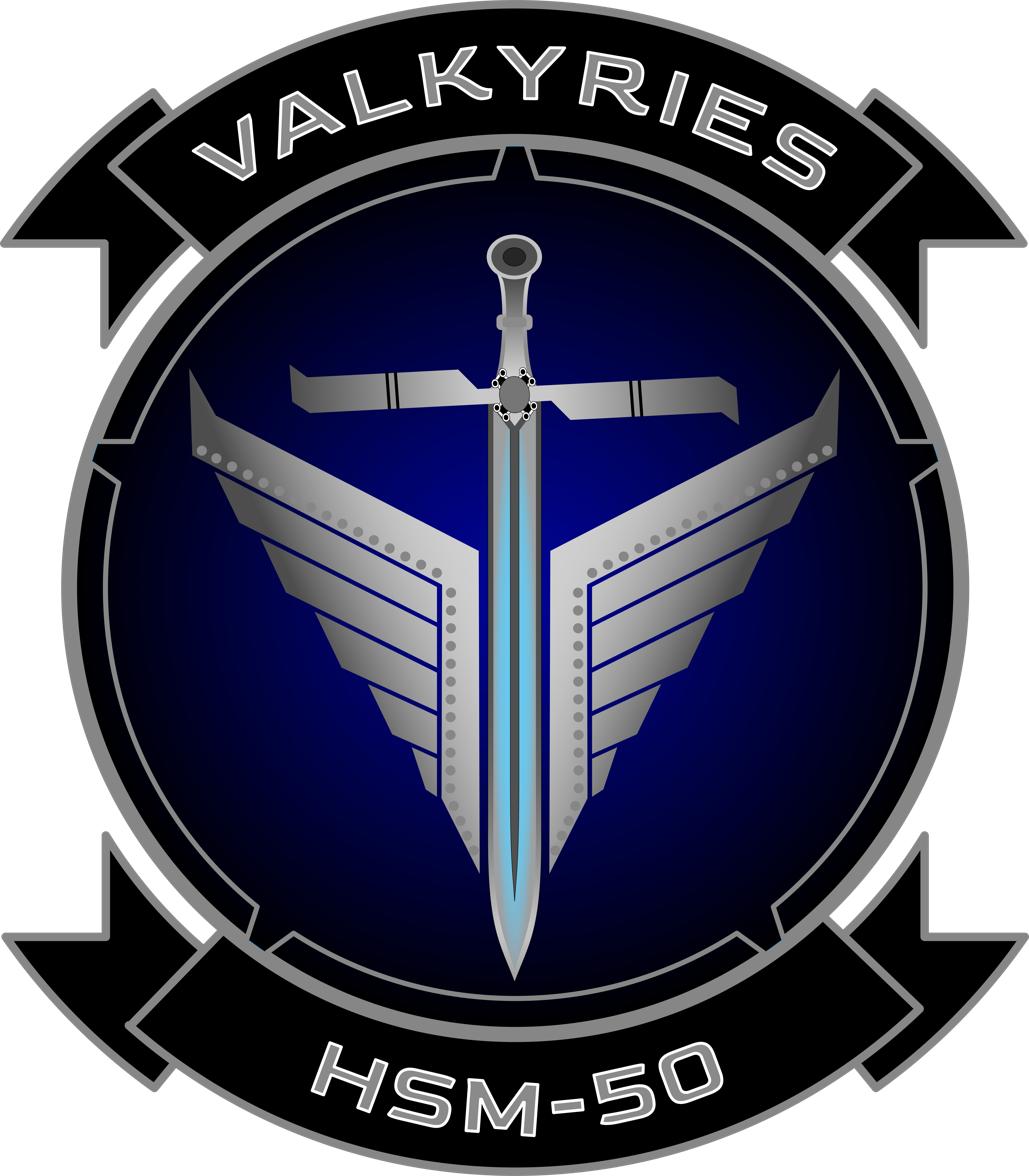
- HSM-50 squadron emblem
- Active: 1 October 2021 -
- Country: United States of America
- Branch: United States Navy
- Type: Naval Helicopter Squadron
- Role: Anti-submarine warfare (ASW); Anti-surface warfare (ASUW); Search and rescue (SAR)
- Garrison/HQ: Adm David L. McDonald Field, Naval Station Mayport
- Nickname: "Valkyries"

Helicopter Maritime Strike Squadron 50 (HSM-50) "Valkyries" is a United States Navy helicopter squadron based at Adm David L. McDonald Field, Naval Station Mayport, Mayport, Florida, United States. The squadron will be under the control of Helicopter Maritime Strike Wing Atlantic.

The squadron performs a diverse set of multi-role missions:

Primary missions include:

- Anti-submarine warfare (ASW)
- Anti-surface warfare (ASU)

Secondary missions include:

- Search and rescue (SAR)
- Medical evacuation (MEDEVAC)
- Vertical replenishment (VERTREP)
- Special operations support (SPECOPS)
- Naval Surface Fire Support (NSFS)
- Communications Relay (COMREL)
- Logistics support

== See also ==
- History of the United States Navy
- List of United States Navy aircraft squadrons
