= USS Stockdale (DDG-106) =

United States Navy guided missile destroyer

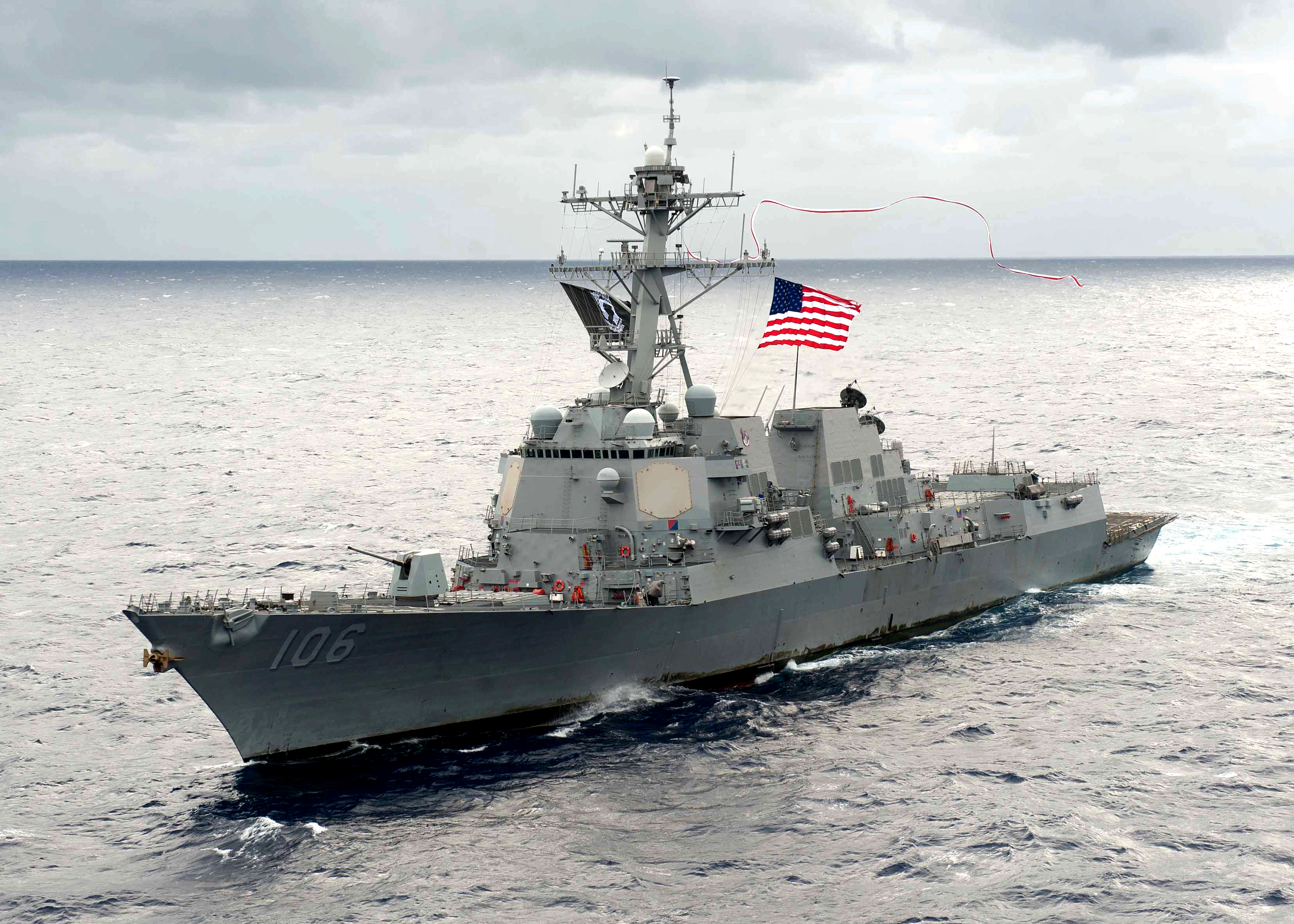
- USS Stockdale underway in 2013

History

United States
- Name: Stockdale
- Namesake: James B. Stockdale
- Awarded: 13 September 2002
- Builder: Bath Iron Works
- Laid down: 10 August 2006
- Launched: 24 February 2008
- Sponsored by: Sybil Stockdale
- Christened: 10 May 2008
- Acquired: 30 September 2008
- Commissioned: 18 April 2009
- Home port: San Diego
- Identification: MMSI number: 368771000; Callsign: NJBS; Hull number: DDG-106
- Motto: Return With Honor
- Honors and awards: See Awards
- Status: in active service
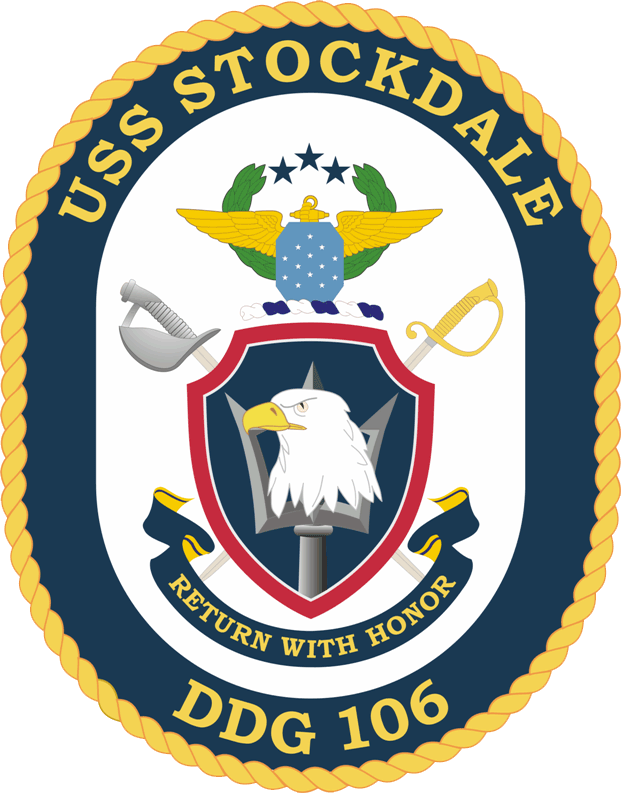
- Badge

General characteristics
- Class & type: Arleigh Burke-class destroyer
- Displacement: 9,200 tons
- Length: 509 ft 6 in (155.30 m)
- Beam: 66 ft (20 m)
- Draft: 22 ft (6.7 m)
- Propulsion: 4 × General Electric LM2500-30 gas turbines, 2 shafts, 100,000 shp (75 MW)
- Speed: 30 kn (56 km/h)
- Complement: 380 officers and enlisted
- Armament: Guns: 1 × 5-inch (127 mm)/62 mk 45 mod 4 (lightweight gun); 1 × 20 mm (0.8 in) Phalanx CIWS; 2 × 25 mm (0.98 in) Mk 38 machine gun system; 4 × 0.50 inches (12.7 mm) caliber guns; Lasers: Optical Dazzling Interdictor, Navy (ODIN); Missiles: 1 × 32-cell, 1 × 64-cell (96 total cells) Mk 41 vertical launching system (VLS): RIM-66M surface-to-air missile; RIM-156 surface-to-air missile; RIM-174A standard ERAM; RIM-161 anti-ballistic missile; RIM-162 ESSM (quad-packed); BGM-109 Tomahawk cruise missile; RUM-139 vertical launch ASROC; Torpedoes: 2 × Mark 32 triple torpedo tubes: Mark 46 lightweight torpedo; Mark 50 lightweight torpedo; Mark 54 lightweight torpedo
- Aircraft carried: 2 × MH-60R Seahawk helicopters

USS Stockdale (DDG-106) is an Arleigh Burke-class (Flight IIA) Aegis guided missile destroyer in the United States Navy. The first U.S. Navy ship of that name, Stockdale is named after Vice Admiral James Bond Stockdale (1923–2005). She was authorized on 13 September 2002 and was built by Bath Iron Works. Stockdale was christened 10 May 2008 by Admiral Stockdale's widow, Sybil, and delivered to the Navy on 30 September 2008. She transited the Panama Canal in March 2009; Admiral Stockdale's youngest son and grandchildren joined the ship for the trip. USS Stockdale was commissioned on 18 April 2009 at Port Hueneme.

== Ship history ==
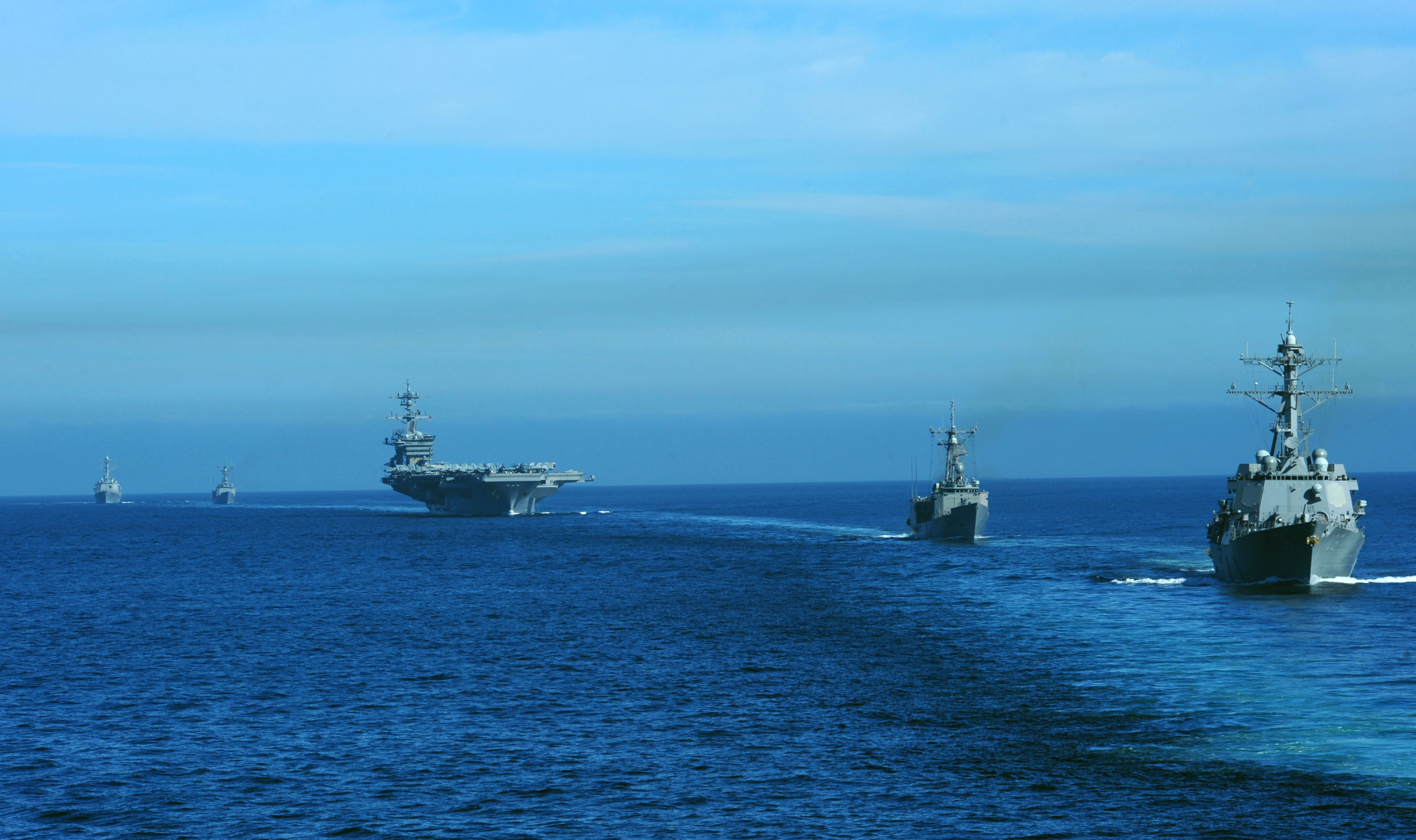
USS Stockdale leads USS Gary, with USS Carl Vinson, USS Rentz, and USS Gridley behind, 9 December 2010

From November 2010 to July 2011, Stockdale performed an eight-month deployment in the United States Seventh Fleet Area of Responsibility. She made ports of call at Guam, Sepangar, Malaysia; Sihanoukville, Cambodia; Laem Chabang, Thailand; Singapore, and Chinhae, South Korea.

In July 2012, Stockdale participated in the naval exercise RIMPAC 2012. This included maneuvers in the Kaulakahi Channel (between Kauai and Niihau Islands, Hawaii) near the PMRF.

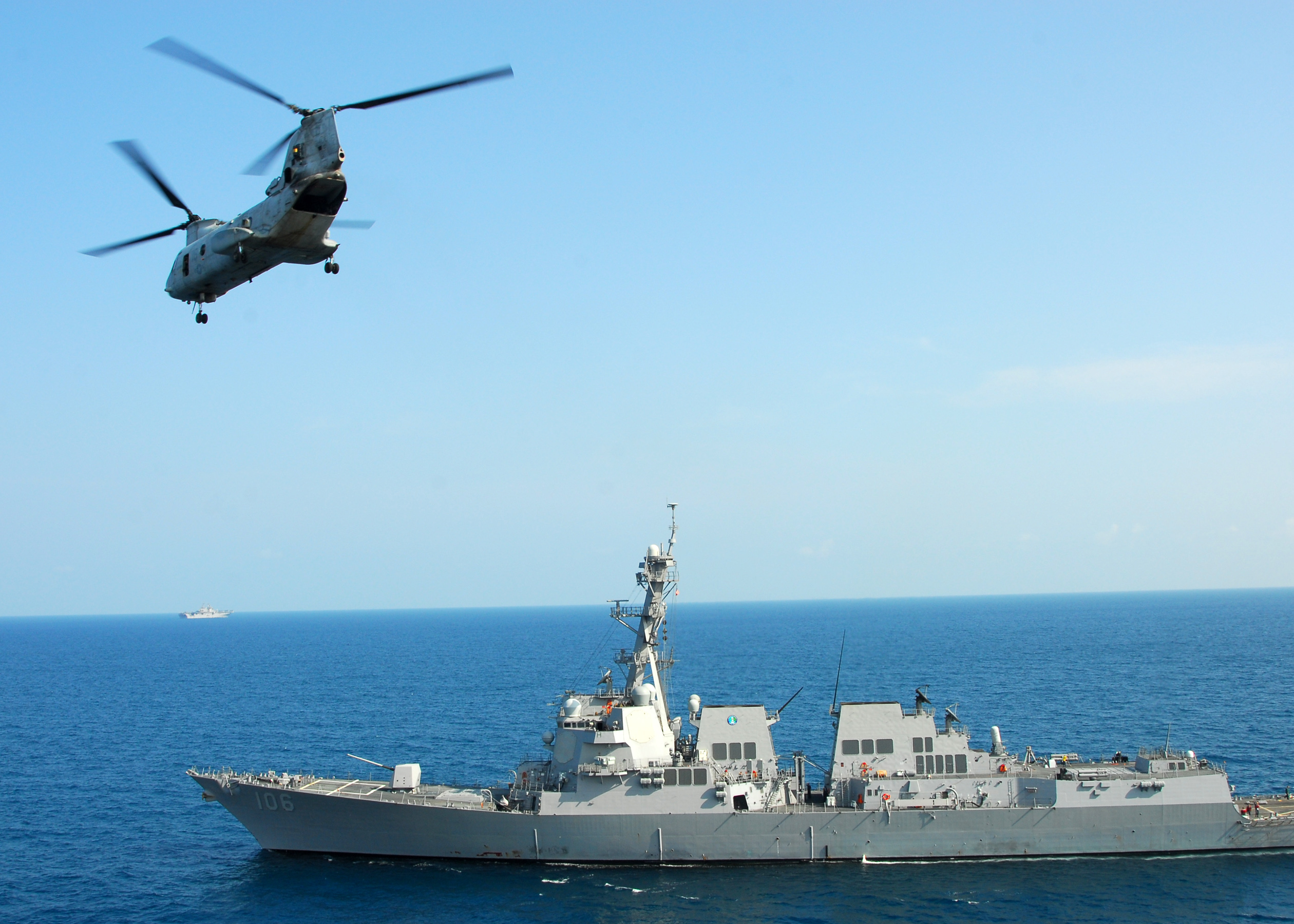
USS Stockdale and CH-46E Sea Knight helicopter

USS Stockdale departed San Diego in July 2021 and joined Carrier Strike Group One. Stockdale’s sonar dome was damaged while underway, it was discovered in port Sasebo while investigating a fuel tank crack on 21 January 2022 and repairs were made in Yokosuka drydock. After the damages were repaired, Stockdale began its journey home and arrived at San Diego on 15 July 2022.

Stockdale arrived at the Port of Colombo, situated in Colombo, Sri Lanka on 22 August 2024 on a replenishment visit. The vessel was scheduled to depart the island on 23 August 2024.

On the morning of 27 September 2024, while transiting the Red Sea with the Arleigh Burke-class destroyer USS Spruance and Freedom-class littoral combat ship USS Indianapolis, she was attacked by roughly two dozen missiles and drones launched by Iranian-backed Houthi rebels in Yemen. All missiles and drones were intercepted by the flotilla or missed their target outright.

On 11 November 2024, the Houthis again attacked the Spruance and Stockdale, launching eight drones, five ballistic missiles and three cruise missiles at the American destroyers. All of the projectiles were shot down by the destroyers with no damage or casualties to the vessels. The Stockdale used the destroyer's five-inch gun to shoot down one of the Houthi uncrewed aerial vehicles while transiting the Bab el-Mandeb Strait, going from the Red Sea into the Gulf of Aden.

On 1 December 2024, the Stockdale and USS O'Kane were attacked by Houthis with three ballistic missiles, three drones and one cruise missile while escorting three merchant vessels in the Gulf of Aden. All of the projectiles were intercepted with no damage or casualties.

Stockdale and O'Kane were attacked again while escorting three merchant vessels in the Gulf of Aden on 9–10 December. They successfully engaged and defeated multiple drones and one cruise missile with no damage or casualties.

The USS Stockdale arrived in Panama on September 20th, 2025 on its way to joining the growing U.S. Navy presence in the Caribbean as part of President Donald Trump’s campaign to combat drug cartels.

== Awards ==
- Combat Action Ribbon - (Sep–Dec 2024)
- Navy E Ribbon - (2010, 2015, 2024, 2025)
- Navy Expeditionary Medal - (Sep-Nov 2013)
- National Defense Service Medal - (2009)
- Global War on Terrorism Service Medal - (2009)
- Sea Service Deployment Ribbon

== Deployments ==
- 30 November 2010 – 22 July 2011 Maiden deployment
- 24 January 2013 – 8 November 2013 WESTPAC
- 20 January 2016 – 29 August 2016
- 20 October 2018 – 20 May 2019
- 24 July 2024 – 21 February 2025
- 11 September 2025 - 10 April 2026

During her 2024–25 deployment to 5th fleet, Stockdale participated in more combat than any other U.S. Navy ship since the end of World War II.
