= USS St. Louis (LCS-19) =

Freedom-class littoral combat ship of the United States Navy

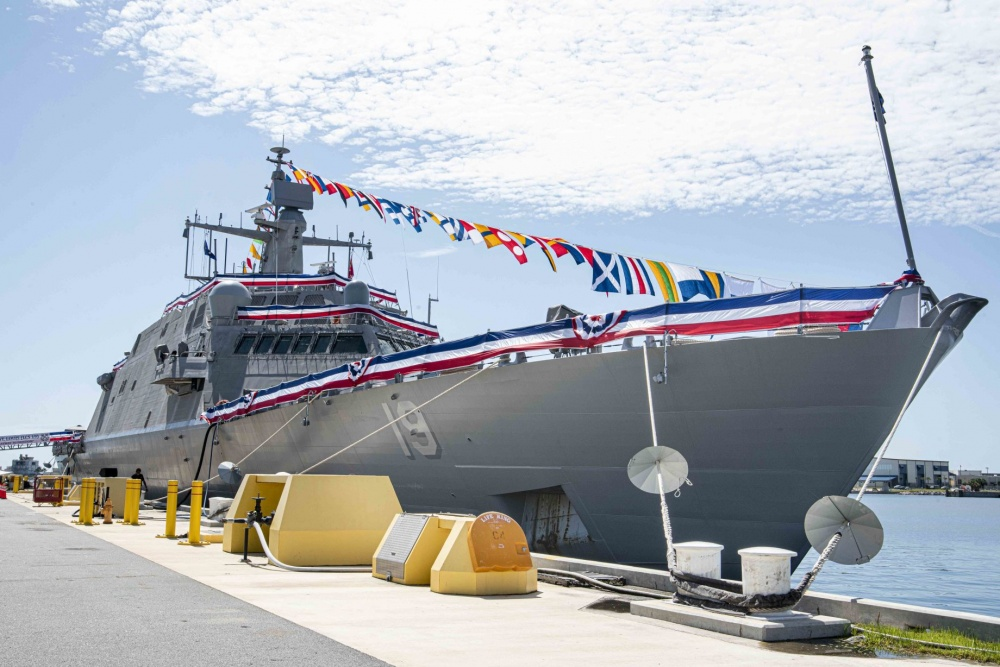
- USS St. Louis during her commissioning ceremony on 8 August 2020

History

United States
- Name: St. Louis
- Namesake: St. Louis
- Awarded: 29 December 2010
- Builder: Marinette Marine
- Laid down: 17 May 2017
- Launched: 15 December 2018
- Acquired: 6 February 2020
- Commissioned: 8 August 2020
- Home port: Mayport
- Identification: MMSI number: 368926297; Hull number: LCS-19
- Motto: Gateway to Freedom
- Status: Active
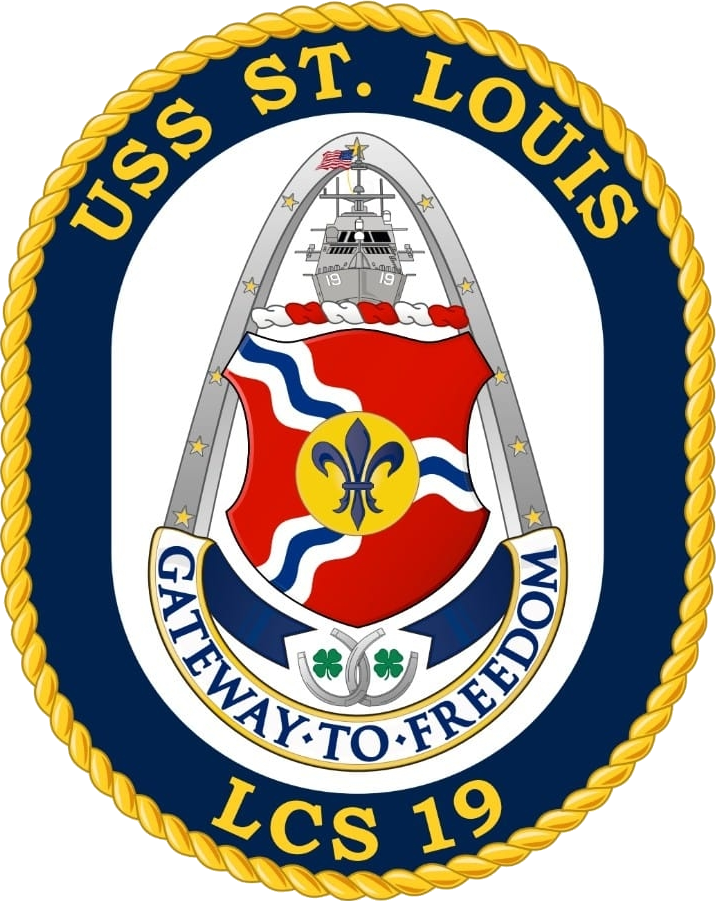
- Badge

General characteristics
- Class & type: Freedom-class littoral combat ship
- Displacement: 3,500 metric tons (3,900 short tons) full load
- Length: 378.3 ft (115.3 m)
- Beam: 57.4 ft (17.5 m)
- Draft: 13.0 ft (4.0 m)
- Propulsion: 2 Rolls-Royce MT30 36 MW gas turbines, 2 Colt-Pielstick diesel engines, 4 Rolls-Royce waterjets
- Speed: 45 knots (52 mph; 83 km/h) (sea state 3)
- Range: 3,500 nmi (6,500 km) at 18 knots (21 mph; 33 km/h)
- Endurance: 21 days (336 hours)
- Boats & landing craft carried: 11 m RHIB, 40 ft (12 m) high-speed boats
- Complement: 15 to 50 core crew, 75 mission crew (Blue and Gold crews)
- Armament: BAE Systems Mk 110 57 mm gun; RIM-116 Rolling Airframe Missiles; Honeywell Mk 50 Torpedo; NETFIRES PAM missile in the ASuW module; 2 .50 cal (12.7 mm) guns; can be fitted with up to 4 Bushmaster 30mm guns
- Aircraft carried: 2 MH-60R/S Seahawks; MQ-8 Fire Scout
- Aviation facilities: Flight Deck, Hangar Bay
- Notes: Electrical power is provided by 4 Isotta Fraschini V1708 diesel engines with Hitzinger generator units rated at 800 kW each.

USS St. Louis (LCS-19) is a Freedom-class littoral combat ship of the United States Navy. She is the seventh ship in naval service named after St. Louis, Missouri.

== Design ==
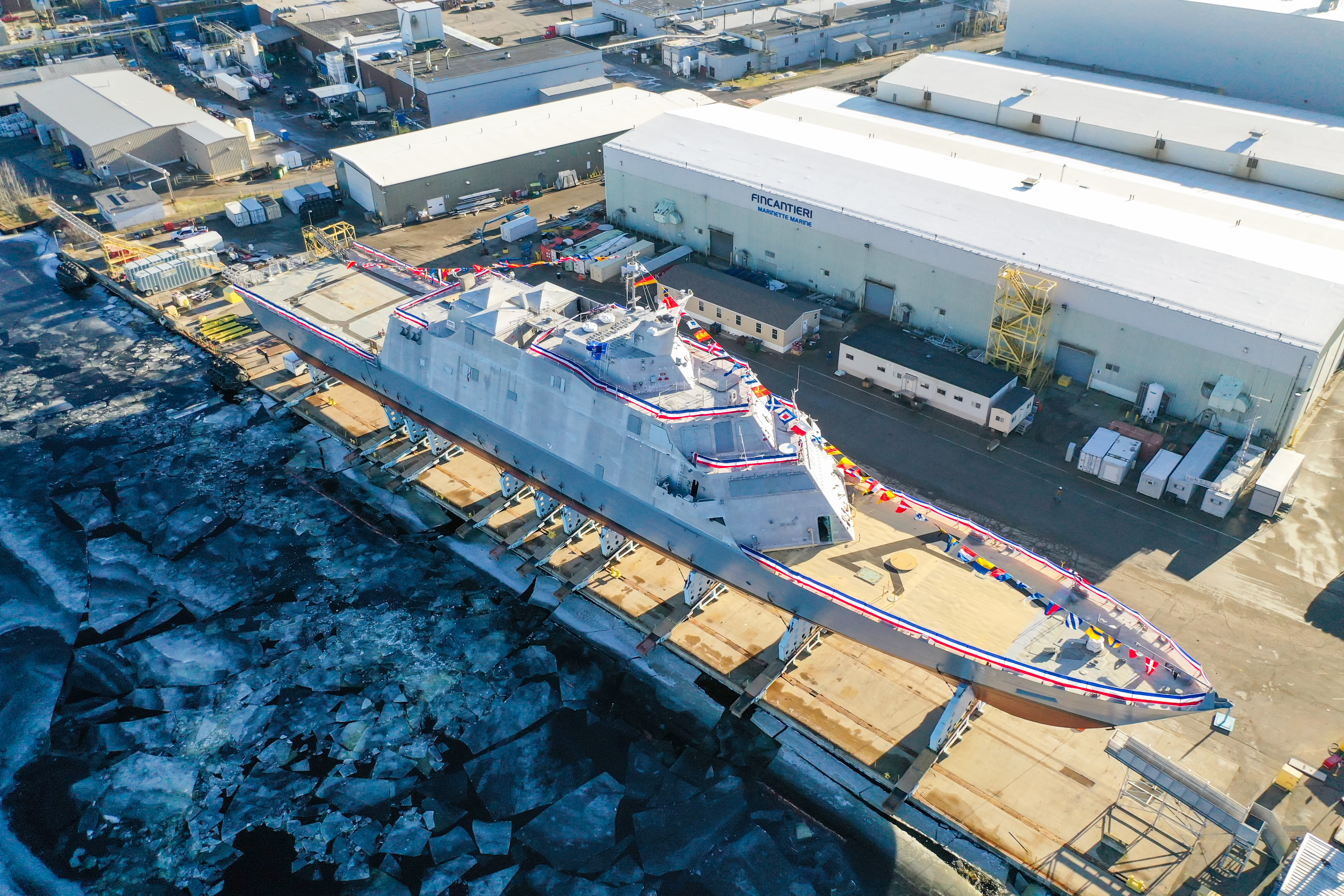
Aerial view

In 2002, the US Navy initiated a program to develop the first of a fleet of littoral combat ships. The Navy initially ordered two monohull ships from Lockheed Martin, which became known as the Freedom-class littoral combat ships after the first ship of the class, USS Freedom. Odd-numbered U.S. Navy littoral combat ships are built using the Freedom-class monohull design, while even-numbered ships are based on a competing design, the trimaran hull Independence-class littoral combat ship from General Dynamics. The initial order of littoral combat ships involved a total of four ships, including two of the Freedom-class design. St. Louis is the tenth Freedom-class littoral combat ship to be built.

== Construction and career ==
St. Louis was built in Marinette, Wisconsin by Marinette Marine. The ship was christened and launched on 15 December 2018. She was commissioned on 8 August 2020 and is assigned to Littoral Combat Ship Squadron Two.
