= USS Indianapolis (LCS-17) =

Freedom-class littoral combat ship of the United States Navy

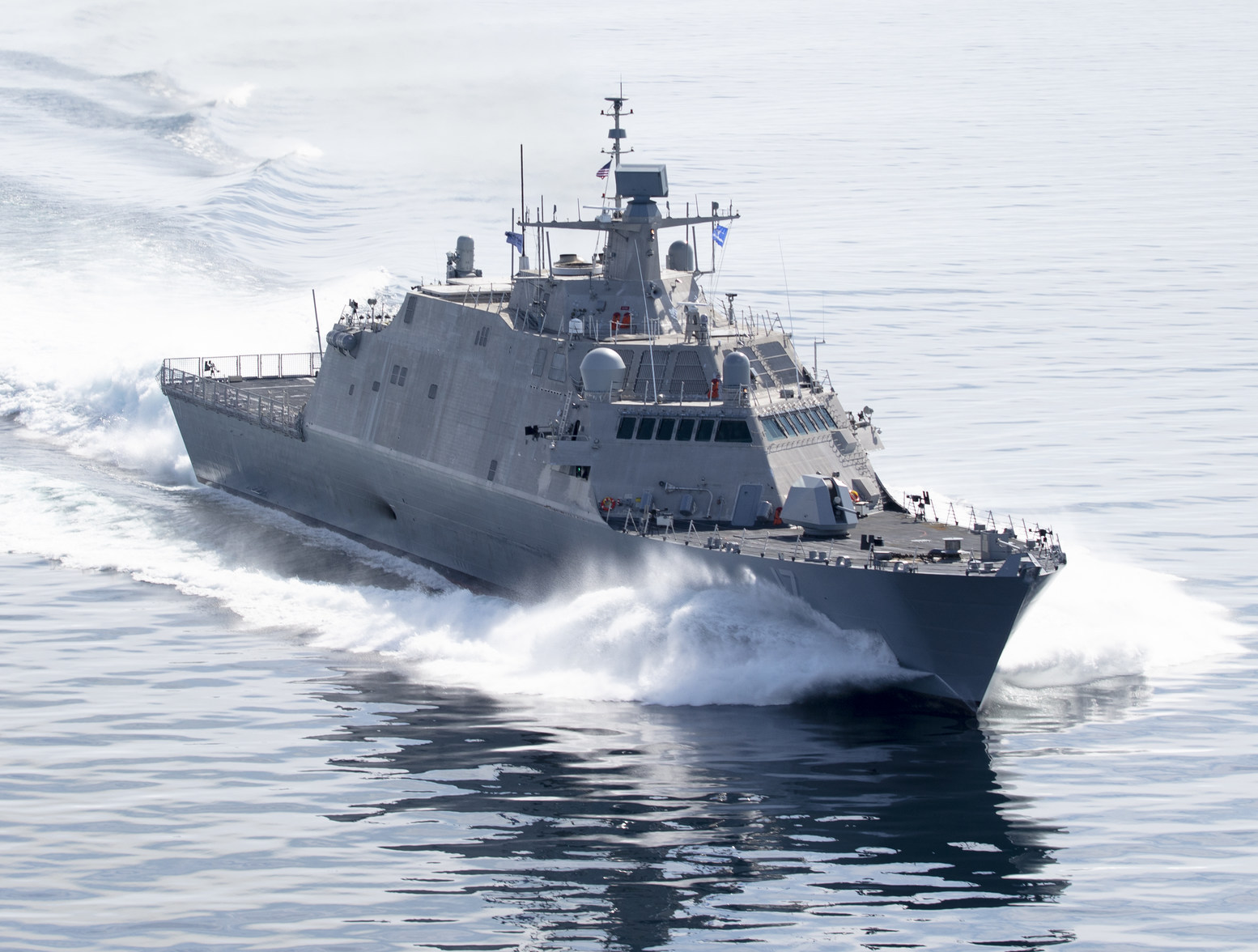
- Indianapolis undergoing acceptance trials in Lake Michigan in 2019

History

United States
- Name: Indianapolis
- Namesake: Indianapolis, IN
- Awarded: 29 December 2010
- Builder: Marinette Marine
- Laid down: 18 July 2016
- Launched: 18 April 2018
- Christened: 14 April 2018
- Acquired: 26 July 2019
- Commissioned: 26 October 2019
- Home port: Mayport
- Identification: MMSI number: 368926296; Callsign: NIDP; Hull number LCS-17
- Motto: Legacy of War
- Status: Active
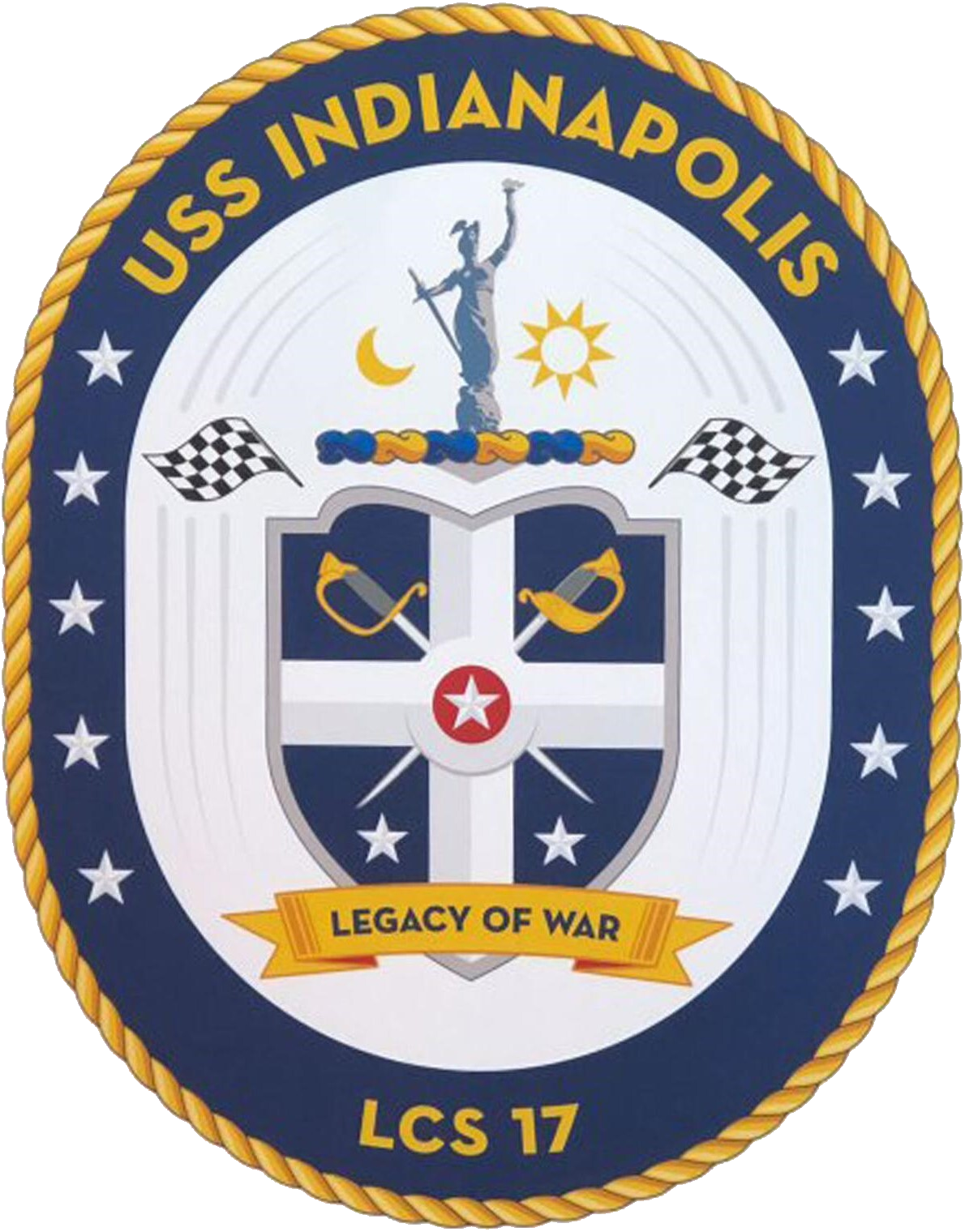
- Badge

General characteristics
- Class & type: Freedom-class littoral combat ship
- Displacement: 3,500 metric tons (3,900 short tons) full load
- Length: 378.3 ft (115.3 m)
- Beam: 57.4 ft (17.5 m)
- Draft: 13.0 ft (4.0 m)
- Propulsion: 2 Rolls-Royce MT30 36 MW gas turbines, 2 Colt-Pielstick diesel engines, 4 Rolls-Royce waterjets
- Speed: 45 knots (52 mph; 83 km/h) (sea state 3)
- Range: 3,500 nmi (6,500 km) at 18 knots (21 mph; 33 km/h)
- Endurance: 21 days (336 hours)
- Boats & landing craft carried: 11 m RHIB, 40 ft (12 m) high-speed boats
- Complement: 15 to 50 core crew, 75 mission crew (Blue and Gold crews)
- Sensors & processing systems: TRS-4D AESA radar
- Armament: BAE Systems Mk 110 57 mm gun; RIM-116 Rolling Airframe Missiles; Honeywell Mk 50 Torpedo; NETFIRES PAM missile in the ASuW module; 2 .50 cal (12.7 mm) guns; can be fitted with up to 4 Bushmaster 30mm guns
- Aircraft carried: 2 MH-60R/S Seahawks; MQ-8 Fire Scout
- Aviation facilities: Flight Deck, Hangar Bay
- Notes: Electrical power is provided by 4 Isotta Fraschini V1708 diesel engines with Hitzinger generator units rated at 800 kW each.

USS Indianapolis (LCS-17) is a Freedom-class littoral combat ship of the United States Navy. She is the fourth vessel in the navy named after Indianapolis, Indiana.

== Design ==
In 2002, the US Navy initiated a program to develop the first of a fleet of littoral combat ships. The Navy initially ordered two monohull ships from Lockheed Martin, which became known as the Freedom-class littoral combat ships after the first ship of the class, USS Freedom. Odd-numbered U.S. Navy littoral combat ships are built using the Freedom-class monohull design, while even-numbered ships are based on a competing design, the trimaran hull Independence-class littoral combat ship from General Dynamics. The initial order of littoral combat ships involved a total of four ships, including two of the Freedom-class design. Indianapolis is the tenth Freedom-class littoral combat ship to be built.

Indianapolis includes additional stability improvements over the original Freedom design; the stern transom was lengthened and buoyancy tanks were added to the stern to increase weight service and enhance stability. The ship will also feature automated sensors to allow "conditions-based maintenance" and reduce crew overwork and fatigue issues that Freedom had on her first deployment.

== Construction and career ==
Marinette Marine was awarded the contract to build the ship on 29 December 2010. Construction began on 18 July 2016 and she was launched on 18 April 2018. she is homeported to Naval Station Mayport, Florida and assigned to Littoral Combat Ship Squadron Two.

Indianapolis was commissioned in a ceremony at Burns Harbor, Indiana on 26 October 2019.

As of March 2020, Indianapolis is billeted to act in the mine countermeasures (MCM) role.

On the morning of September 27, 2024, while transiting the Red Sea with Arleigh Burke class destroyers USS Stockdale (DDG-106) and USS Spruance (DDG-111), she was attacked by roughly two dozen missiles and drones launched by Iranian backed Houthi rebels in Yemen. All missiles and drones were intercepted or missed their target outright. Indianapolis returned home from the deployment in November.

While the ship was at Mayport on 24 June, a fire broke out aboard Indianapolis. The crew quickly suppressed it, but seven crew members suffered minor injuries.

== Awards ==
- Combat Action Ribbon - (Sep 2024)
