= USS Typhoon =

1993 Cyclone-class patrol ship

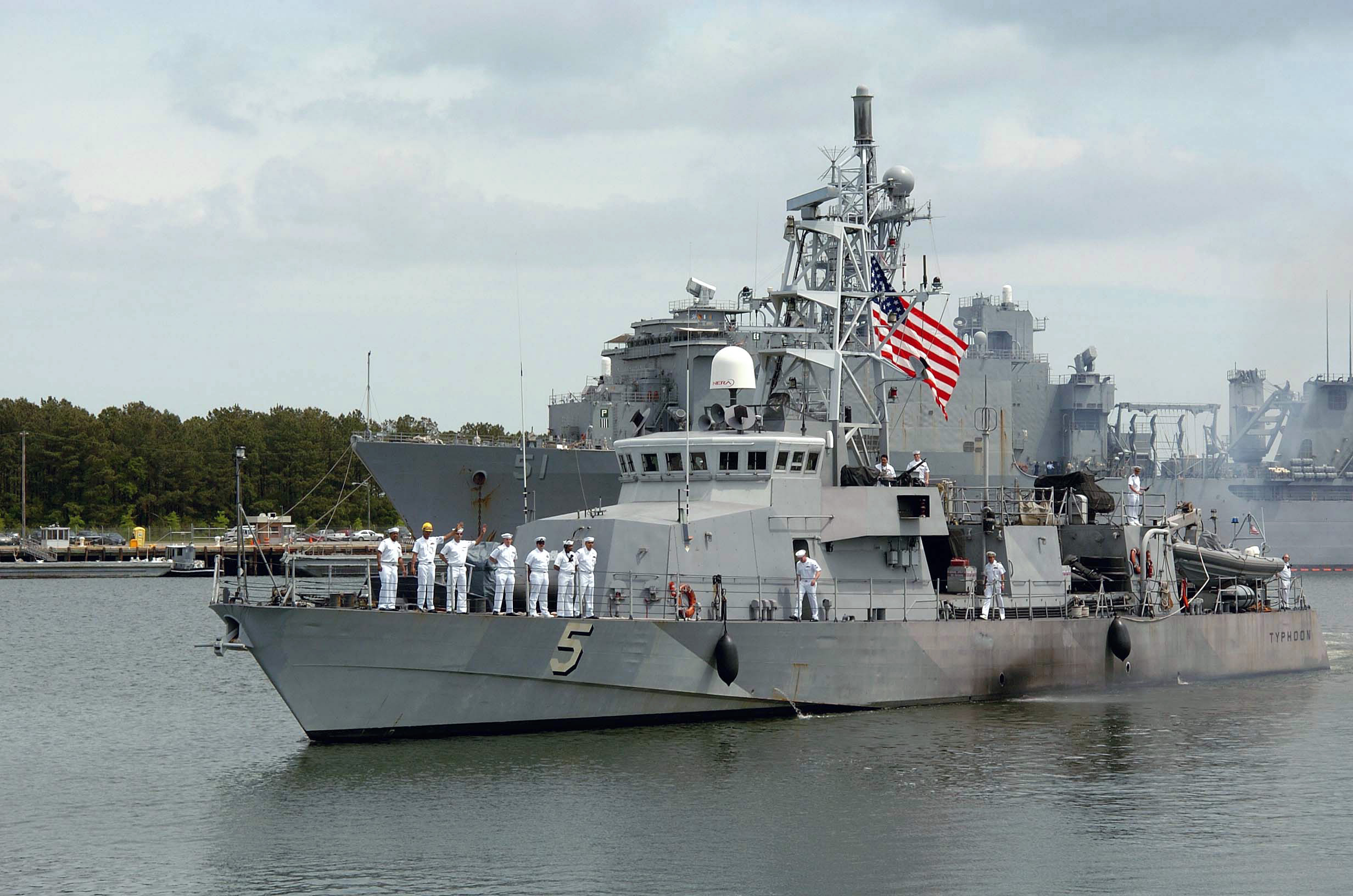
- USS Typhoon (PC-5) leaving Naval Amphibious Base Little Creek in Virginia. USS Oak Hill is in the background.

History

United States
- Name: Typhoon
- Namesake: Typhoon
- Ordered: 3 August 1990
- Builder: Bollinger Shipyards, Lockport, Louisiana
- Laid down: 15 May 1992
- Launched: 3 March 1993
- Acquired: 1 December 1993
- Commissioned: 12 February 1994
- Decommissioned: 28 February 2022
- Home port: Manama, Bahrain
- Motto: E Malacia ad Fulmina
- Status: Decommissioned
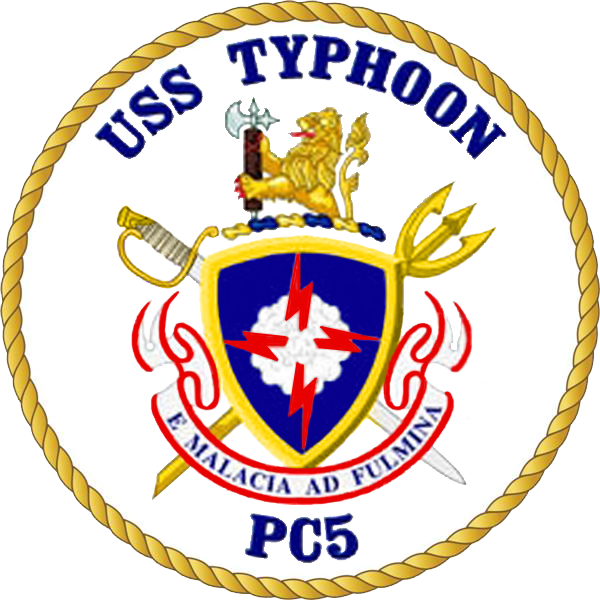
- Badge

Bahrain
- Name: RBNS Damsah (دمسة)
- Acquired: 30 March 2022
- Identification: Hull number (70)
- Status: In service

General characteristics
- Class & type: Cyclone-class patrol ship
- Displacement: 375 tons
- Length: 174 ft (53 m)
- Beam: 25 ft (7.6 m)
- Draught: 7.5 ft (2.3 m)
- Speed: 35 knots (65 km/h; 40 mph)
- Complement: 4 officers, 24 enlisted
- Armament: (USN) 2 Mk38 chain guns; 2 Mk19 grenade launchers; 2 .50 (12.7 mm) machine guns; Griffin Missile System

USS Typhoon (PC-5) was the fifth United States Navy Cyclone-class patrol ship. Typhoon was laid down 15 May 1992 at Bollinger Shipyards, in Lockport, Louisiana and launched 3 March 1993. She was commissioned 12 February 1994 in Tampa, Florida. As of 2008, Typhoon operates in the Persian Gulf, stationed in Manama, Bahrain since 2004 and is permanently crewed by a 24-person complement that performs maritime security operations in United States Fifth Fleet Area of Responsibility (AOR).

== History ==
Typhoon participated in BALTOPS 95.

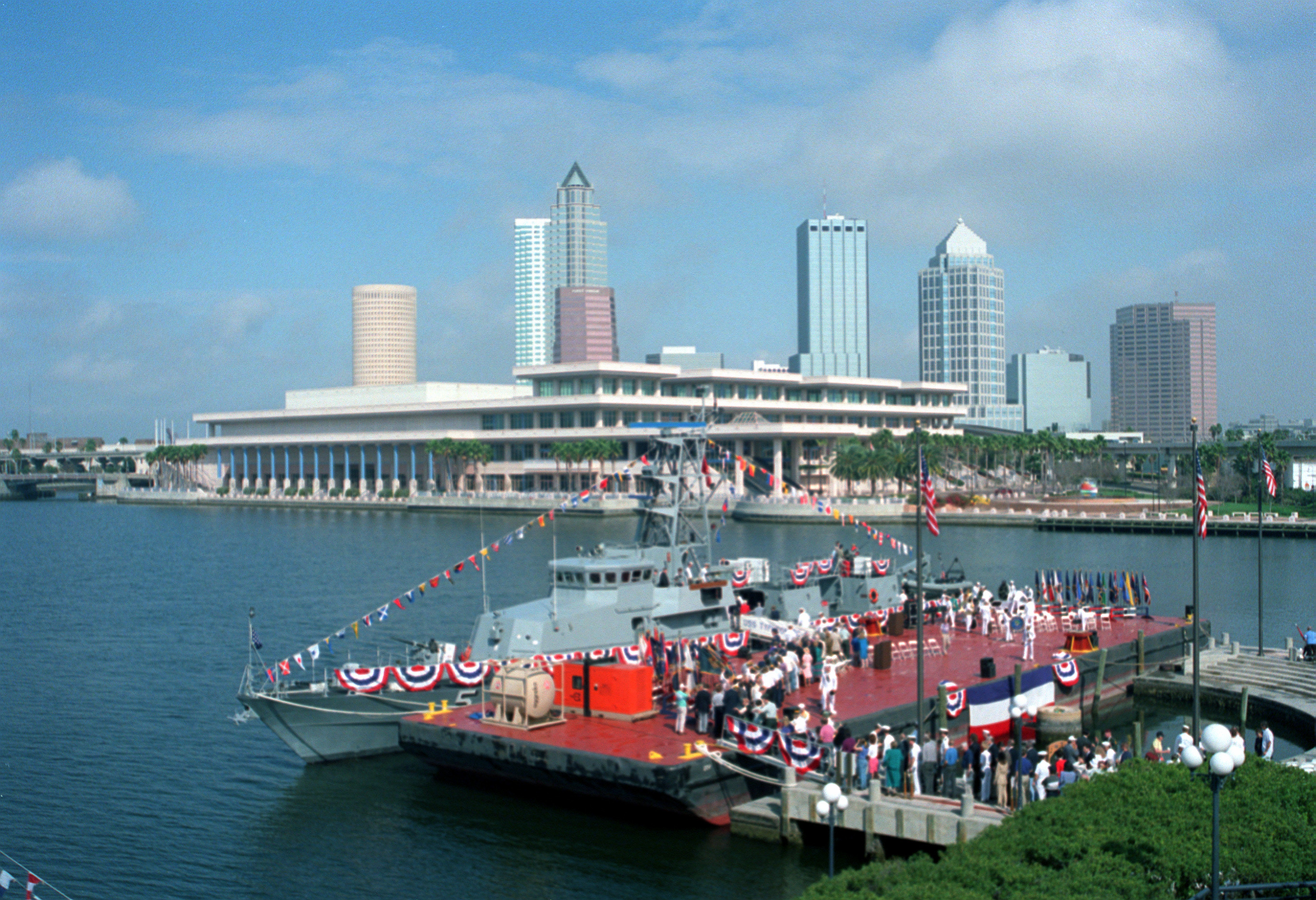
USS Typhoon (PC-5) commissioning in Tampa, Florida.

In August 2001, Typhoon visited Koper, Slovenia to participate in joint training with the Slovene patrol ship Ankaran.

Typhoon returned to Naval Amphibious Base Little Creek 9 May 2003 following a deployment in support of the global war on terrorism. Typhoon lost a crewmember when Engineman 2nd Class Douglas Bolles was lost at sea after falling overboard from a rigid hull inflatable boat (RHIB) off Cape Henry on 7 November 2003 and subsequently found to have removed his life vest. Bolles body was recovered 22 November 2003. She was decommissioned on 28 February 2022 and transferred to the Royal Bahrain Naval forces on 30 March 2022 as the RBNS Damsah.

== Service in the Middle East ==
At the end of April 2004, Typhoon and USS Sirocco (PC-6) departed Naval Amphibious Base Little Creek for the Persian Gulf to relieve USS Firebolt (PC-10) and USS Chinook (PC-9). The ships were to be deployed for 18 months while crews would be swapped every six months. The ships were escorted by USNS Patuxent (T-AO-201) during the trans-Atlantic portion of the trip. In June 2004, Typhoon and Sirocco arrived in the Persian Gulf to assist in maritime security operations and enforce a 2,000 meter exclusion zone around the Al Basrah (ABOT) and Khawr Al Amaya (KAAOT) oil terminals.

In December 2004, Typhoon responded to a distress call from a dhow and rescued an unconscious fisherman knocked overboard by a winch handle while hauling in fishing nets. The fisherman was transferred to USS Essex (LHD-2).

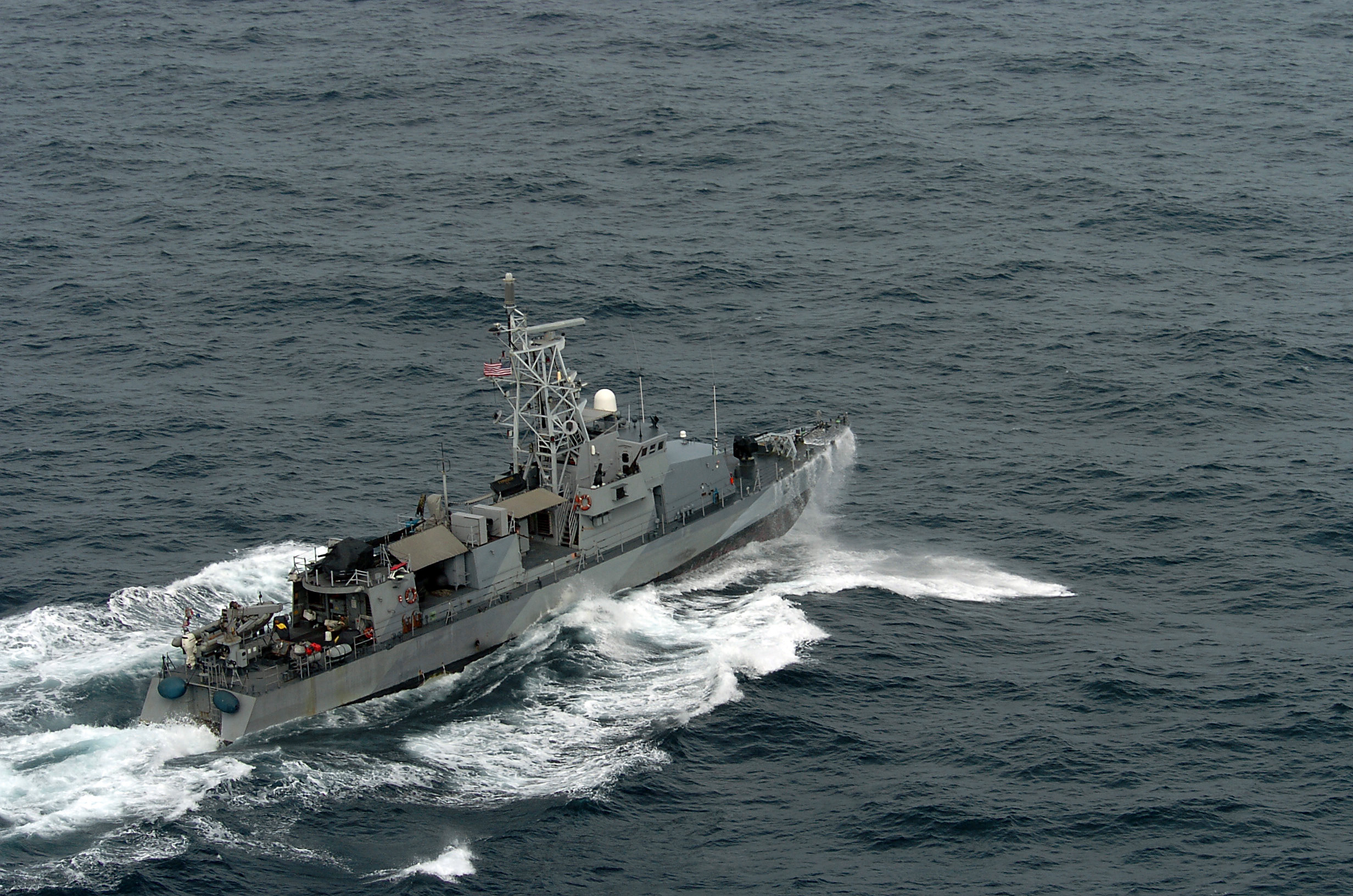
USS Typhoon (PC 5) patrols the waters of the Persian Gulf, February 2005.

In May 2005, Typhoon participated in the rescue of 89 people from a small dhow which capsized in the Gulf of Aden, 25 miles off the coast of Somalia.

In April 2006, Typhoon performed maritime security operations with HNLMS Amsterdam and USCGC Wrangell off the Horn of Africa and in the Arabian Sea. Typhoon used her smaller size and faster speed to intercept dhows and other merchant vessels to gather intelligence on maritime activity and prevent piracy and terrorism in the area.

On 7 September 2007, sailors from Typhoon rescued seven mariners adrift on a raft in the Persian Gulf. At the time, Typhoon was based in Bahrain providing security for Iraqi oil platforms in the northern Persian Gulf and participating in Maritime Security Operations.

In March 2016, the commanding officer of the Typhoon, Lieutenant Commander Jeremiah Daley was removed from command after a Navy investigation had found that he had "failed to maintain equipment to the point of exposing 'his crew to unnecessary risk,' interfered with an inquiry into his actions and once slept drunk on a bench at a Dubai port." The 300-page report on the investigation into Daley, which began in February 2016, was compiled by the Navy and acquired by the Associated Press via a Freedom of Information Act request. Daley denied many of the accusations and said he was appealing.

== Encounter with Iranian craft ==
In April 2008, the Typhoon fired a flare at a small Iranian vessel in the Persian Gulf; U.S. Navy officials said that Iranian ship had come within about 180 meters (200 yards) of the American vessel. The flare was fired after the U.S. ship has unsuccessfully tried to contact the Iranian ship by radio. The Typhoon then proceeded on its way without further incident; Iranian officials said that the encounter was "normal" and "routine" and denied "any new confrontation" in the Persian gulf.

== In Bahraini service ==
USS Typhoon was decommissioned on February 28, 2022. She was commissioned in the Bahraini Navy as RBNS Damsah on March 30 2022.
