= USS Hurricane =

US Navy patrol ship

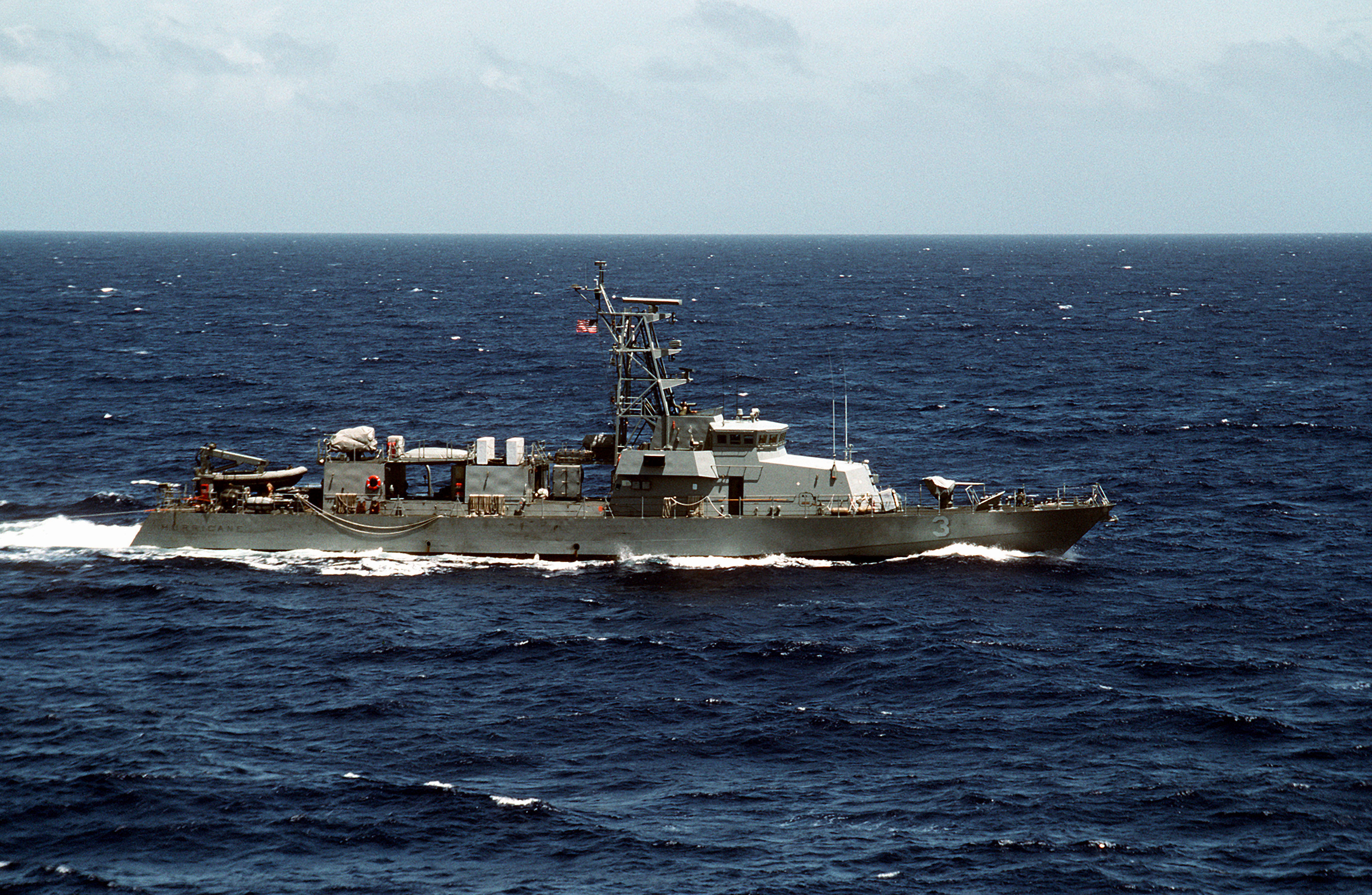
- USS Hurricane in 1994

History

United States
- Name: Hurricane
- Namesake: Hurricane
- Ordered: 3 August 1990
- Builder: Bollinger Shipyards, Lockport, Louisiana
- Laid down: 20 November 1991
- Launched: 6 June 1992
- Sponsored by: Elizabeth W. Cantrell
- Commissioned: 15 October 1993
- Decommissioned: 20 March 2023
- Home port: Manama, Bahrain
- Identification: Hull symbol: PC-3; Call sign: NHAP; MMSI number: 368963000
- Motto: "Strength Honor Courage"
- Nickname(s): The Hurt and Pain
- Fate: Transferred to the Egyptian Navy
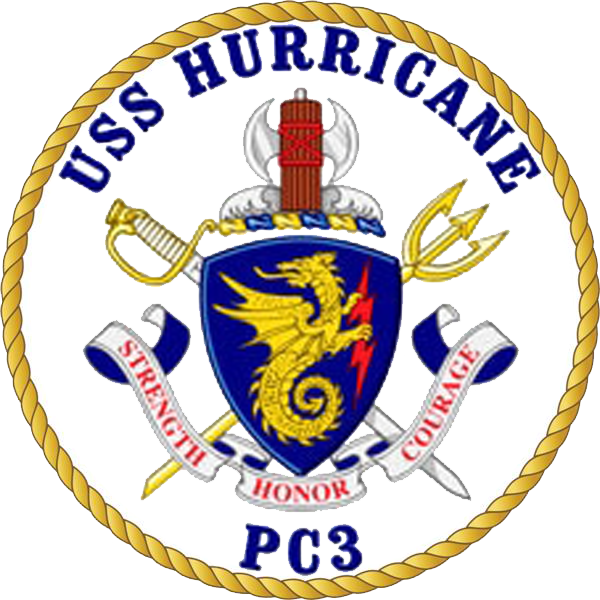
- Badge

Egypt
- Name: Khaled Bin Elwaled
- Namesake: Khalid ibn al-Walid
- Acquired: 21 March 2023
- Home port: Alexandria, Egypt
- Identification: 720
- Status: Active

General characteristics
- Class & type: Cyclone-class patrol ship
- Displacement: 328.5 long tons (333.8 t) (light load); 331 long tons (336 t) (full load)
- Length: 170 ft (52 m); 179 ft (55 m) (refit)
- Beam: 25 ft (7.6 m)
- Draft: 7.5 ft (2.3 m)
- Installed power: 13,400 shp (10,000 kW)
- Propulsion: 4 × Paxman marine Diesel engines; 4 × shafts
- Speed: 35 kn (65 km/h; 40 mph)
- Complement: 4 officers; 24 enlisted; 8 special forces
- Sensors & processing systems: Sperry Vision 2100M integrated navigation/combat system
- Electronic warfare & decoys: 1 × MK 52 chaff launcher
- Armament: 2 × 25 mm (0.98 in) MK 38 "Bushmaster" chain gun (Aft mount removed in refit); 2 × 40 mm (1.6 in) MK 19 grenade launchers; 2 × .50 in (12.7 mm) caliber machine guns; 6 × FIM-92 Stinger SAMs; 1 × Mk96 25 mm cannon/40mm grenade launcher (Refit)

USS Hurricane (PC-3) was the third of the Cyclone-class of United States Navy coastal patrol ships, named for various weather phenomena.

== History ==
Guided tour of Hurricane while moored at Baltimore, c. 2011

=== Construction ===
Hurricane was laid down on 20 November 1991, at Lockport, Louisiana, by Bollinger Machine Shop and Shipyard; launched on 6 June 1992; sponsored by Elizabeth W. Cantrell; and commissioned on 15 October 1993, at Naval Air Station North Island, San Diego, California.

=== Service ===
Following the Haitian Army's overthrow of President Jean-Bertrand Aristide in September 1991, a succession of governments led to sectarian violence, and in May 1994, the military installed Supreme Court Justice Emile Jonassaint as Haiti's provisional president. The United Nations authorized force to restore order and the U.S. initiated Operations Support Democracy and Uphold/Restore Democracy: Uphold Democracy for a peaceful entry into Haiti, and Restore Democracy in the event of resistance.

Hurricane patrolled the Haitian coast during Operation Support Democracy as Haiti agreed to allow the U.S. to land peacefully, operating at times with Navy SEAL teams. On 6 July 1994, the amphibious assault ship Inchon sailed from Norfolk, Virginia, in response to the crisis.Wasp relieved Inchon in Haitian waters on 17 August. The crisis escalated the following month, however, prompting an enlarged response by a multinational force that included the aircraft carriers America and Dwight D. Eisenhower. About 1,800 soldiers of the U.S. Army's XVIII Airborne Corps embarked on board Dwight D. Eisenhower. The U.S. transferred peacekeeping functions to international forces on 31 March 1995.

Hurricane and Squall, together with Patrol Craft crews Juliet, Lima, Kilo, and Mike, shifted their home port from Naval Amphibious Base Coronado, California, to Naval Amphibious Base Little Creek, Virginia, from 1 November–15 December 2005, a move made as part of a reorganization to better fight the Global War on Terrorism. The Navy intended to forward deploy five of the eight Cyclone-class ships at Naval Support Activity Bahrain, and the remaining three at Little Creek.

"SEAL [Sea, Air, Land] teams couldn’t use them because they were too large for their mission," Lt. Bart Denny, Regional Support Organization PC transit coordinator explained, "and we started to transfer the ships to the Coast Guard. After September 11, the demand for them grew. They can get to shallow waters and maneuver quickly where cruisers and destroyers can’t safely operate. This makes them a great asset for protecting oil terminals and overseas port security." Denny further noted the logistics issue: "Keeping the ships on station in Bahrain significantly cuts down on the wear and tear of the ship and reduces the amount of time it takes to get the ship fully operational on station."

In order to maintain the forward-deployed ships the Navy created 16 rotational crews, identified by alpha names, each crew consisting of four officers and 24 enlisted sailors. The move enabled crewmembers to learn together in a single location during seven- to 16-week training cycles.

"By moving the PCs here we’re going to standardize what we do," Lieutenant Commander Brian J. Diebold, Hurricane's commanding officer, observed. "We’ll be able to train here, then fly to the 5th Fleet AOR (area of operations) and accomplish whatever mission is set before us."

The Navy subsequently reinforced the 5th Fleet and Hurricane and USS Monsoon (PC-4) shifted to Bahrain, completing their move on 13 August 2014. Their deployment raised to ten the total number of patrol craft operating within the 5th Fleet.

Hurricane was decommissioned on 20 March 2023. The following day, she was transferred to the Egyptian Navy and commissioned as ENS Khaled Bin Elwaled (720).

== Bibliography ==
- Evans, Mark L. (7 July 2015). "Hurricane (PC-3)". Dictionary of American Naval Fighting Ships. Naval History and Heritage Command. This article incorporates text from this source, which is in the public domain.
- "Hurricane (PC-3)". NavSource.
