= USS Shamal =

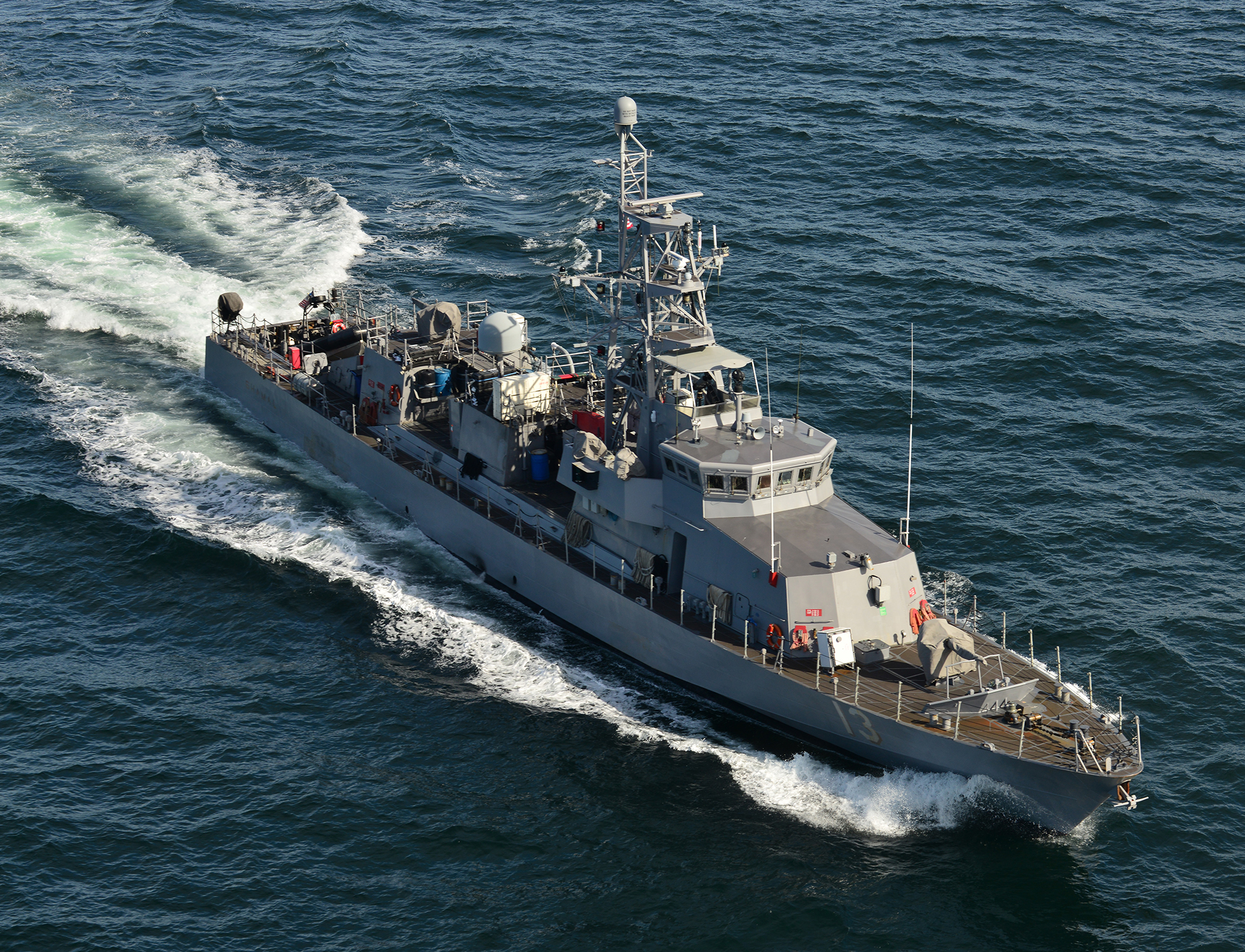
- Shamal underway off the coast of Northern Florida on 2 March 2016

History

United States
- Name: Shamal
- Namesake: Shamal
- Operator: United States Navy
- Ordered: 19 July 1991
- Builder: Bollinger Shipyards, Lockport, Louisiana
- Laid down: 23 September 1994
- Launched: 3 March 1995
- Acquired: 31 October 1995
- Commissioned: 27 January 1996
- Decommissioned: 1 October 2004
- Recommissioned: 30 September 2011
- Decommissioned: 16 February 2021
- Stricken: 26 February 2021
- Identification: Callsign: NSHA
- Motto: The Fury of the Storm
- Fate: Scuttled as an artificial reef March 21st, 2026
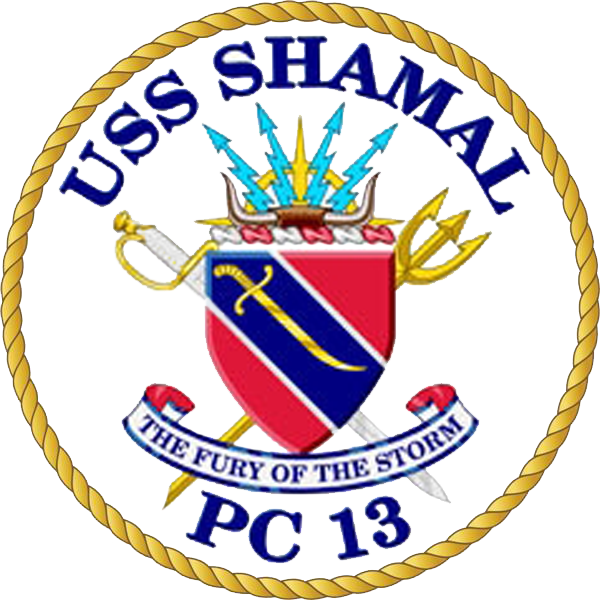
- Badge

United States
- Acquired: 1 October 2004
- Home port: Little Creek, Virginia
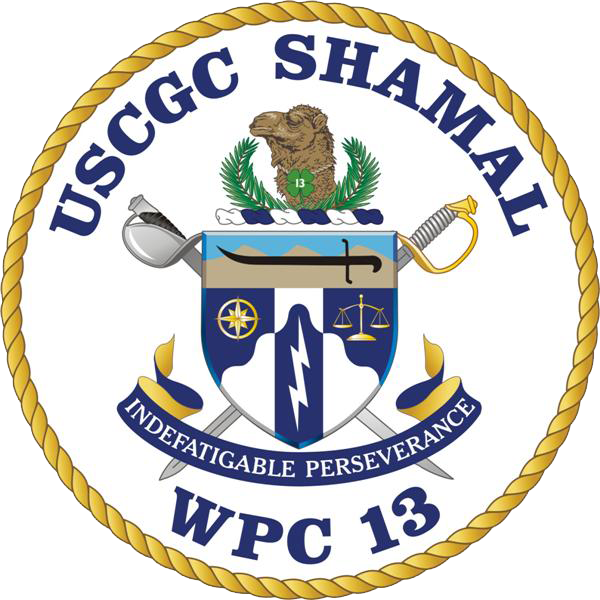
- Badge

General characteristics
- Class & type: Cyclone-class patrol ship
- Displacement: 331 tons
- Length: 179 ft (55 m)
- Beam: 25 ft (7.6 m)
- Draft: 7.5 ft (2.3 m)
- Speed: 35 knots (65 km/h; 40 mph)
- Complement: 4 officers, 24 enlisted
- Armament: 2 Mk38 chain guns (USN); 2 Mk19 grenade launchers; 2 .50 (12.7 mm) machine guns; 6 Stinger missiles

USS Shamal (PC-13) was the thirteenth Cyclone-class patrol ship. Shamal was laid down 23 September 1994 by Bollinger Shipyards, Lockport, Louisiana and launched 3 March 1995. She was commissioned 27 January 1996. Decommissioned by the United States Navy 1 October 2004 and transferred to the United States Coast Guard and recommissioned as the USCGC Shamal (WPC-13).

Shamal was transferred back to the Navy on 30 September 2011, and was once again designated PC-13.

Shamal was decommissioned on 16 February 2021 at Naval Station Mayport.

On March 21st, 2026, the USS Shamal was scuttled off the coast of Okaloosa County, Florida as part of the Florida Fish and Wildlife Conservation Commission's Artificial Reef Program. It was listed as a 331-ton 178' steel vessel. It lies in 165 feet of water.
