= USS Thunderbolt =

Patrol Ship of the US Navy

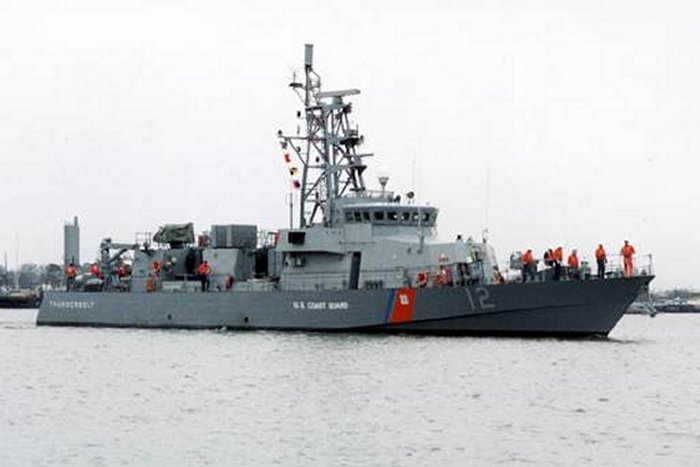
- USS Thunderbolt in both Coast Guard and Navy markings.

History

United States
- Namesake: Thunderbolt
- Ordered: 19 July 1991
- Builder: Bollinger Shipyards, Lockport, Louisiana
- Laid down: 9 June 1994
- Launched: 2 December 1994
- Acquired: 22 March 2023
- Identification: IMO number: 9067855
- Fate: Transferred to the Egyptian Navy
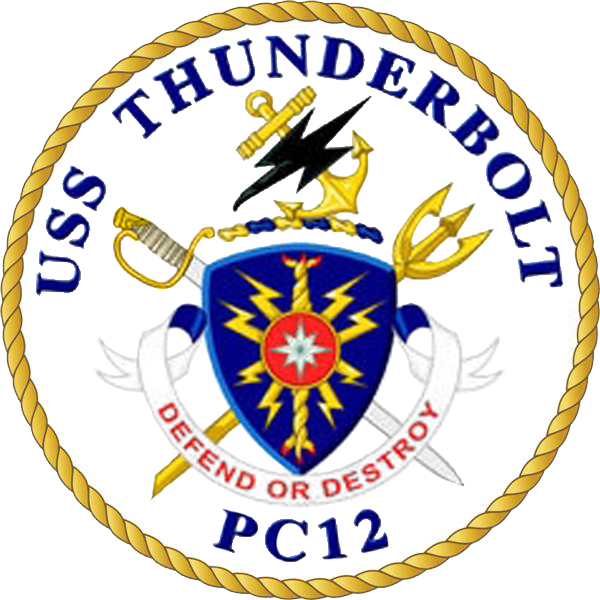
- Badge

Egypt
- Name: Salah El Den Ayoby
- Namesake: Saladin
- Acquired: 21 March 2023
- Identification: 722
- Status: Active

General characteristics
- Class & type: Cyclone-class patrol ship
- Displacement: 331 tons
- Length: 174 ft (53 m)
- Beam: 25 ft (7.6 m)
- Draught: 7.5 ft (2.3 m)
- Speed: 35 knots (65 km/h; 40 mph)
- Complement: 4 officers, 24 men, 8 Special Forces
- Armament: (USN) 2 Mk38 chain guns; 2 Mk19 grenade launchers; 2 .50 (12.7 mm) machine guns; 6 Stinger missiles

USS Thunderbolt (PC-12) was the twelfth Cyclone-class patrol ship. Thunderbolt was laid down 9 June 1994 by Bollinger Shipyards, Lockport, Louisiana, and launched 2 December 1994. She was commissioned by the United States Navy on 7 October 1995.

== Operational history ==
In 2013,Thunderbolt shifted homeport to Naval Support Activity Bahrain, arriving pierside there on 3 July 2013.

On 25 July 2017, Thunderbolt fired warning shots at an Iranian Revolutionary Guard Corps Navy vessel. According to an unnamed U.S. defense official source, "The IRGCN boat was coming in at a high rate of speed. It did not respond to any signals, they did not respond to any bridge-to-bridge calls, they (the USS Thunderbolt) felt there was no choice except to fire the warning shots."

On 30 August 2022, Thunderbolt was involved in an incident with Iran's Islamic Revolutionary Guard Corps (IRGC) when the IRGC's ship Shahid Baziar attempted to tow away a U.S. Navy Saildrone Explorer-type unmanned surface vehicle which had been monitoring the Persian Gulf. Thunderbolt, as well as a U.S. Navy MH-60 Seahawk of Helicopter Sea Combat Squadron 26, moved to intercept the Iranian vessel and by radio identified the drone as U.S. government property. The drone was released after about four hours.

On 22 March 2023, ex-USS Thunderbolt and two of her sister ships were transferred to the Egyptian Navy following transit to Alexandria from the United States. During the transit both US Navy and Egyptian Navy participated in bilateral training in preparation of the transfer.
