= AGM-176 Griffin =

American-made air-to-surface and surface-to-surface guided missile

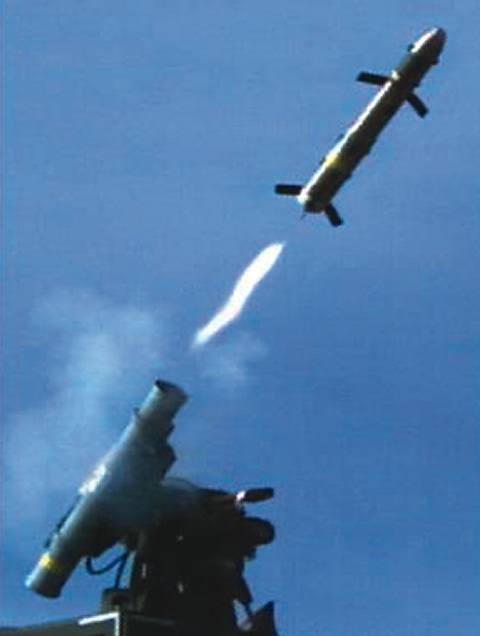
- Launch of a Griffin during testing
- Type: Air-to-surface missile, Surface-to-surface missile
- Place of origin: United States

Service history
- In service: 2008–present
- Used by: United States Air Force; United States Navy; United States Marine Corps; Central Intelligence Agency
- Wars: War in Afghanistan; Iraq War; Syrian Civil War

Production history
- Manufacturer: Raytheon
- Unit cost: $127,333 (FY 2019)
- Produced: 2008–present

Specifications
- Mass: 45 pounds (20 kg) (w/ launch tube)
- Length: 42 inches (110 cm)
- Diameter: 5.5 inches (140 mm)
- Warhead: Blast-fragmentation
- Warhead weight: 13 lb (5.9 kg)
- Propellant: Solid fuel rocket
- Operational range: 5 mi (8.0 km) from surface; 12.5 miles (20.1 km) from altitude
- Guidance system: Laser, GPS or INS
- Launch platform: MQ-1, MQ-9 and other UAVs, Cyclone-class patrol ship

The AGM-176 Griffin is a lightweight, precision-guided munition developed by Raytheon. It can be launched from the ground or air as a rocket-powered missile or dropped from the air as a guided bomb. It carries a relatively small warhead, and was designed to be a precision low-collateral damage weapon for irregular warfare. It has been used in combat by the United States military during the War in Afghanistan.

== Development ==
Raytheon and Lockheed Martin Missiles and Fire Control developed the Griffin as a low-cost modular system, using components from earlier projects, including the FGM-148 Javelin and the AIM-9X Sidewinder. It was originally designed to be launched from the US Special Operations Command's MC-130W Dragon Spear gunship and can be guided either by a semi-active laser seeker or with GPS. Its precision combined with a relatively small 13 lb (5.9 kg) warhead reduces collateral damage.

The munition comes in two versions. Griffin A is an unpowered precision munition that can be dropped from a rear cargo door or a door-mounted launcher that can drop while the cabin is pressurized. Weighing 33 lb (15 kg) and measuring 3.6 ft (1.1 m) in length, it is launched from a 10-tube "Gunslinger" launcher that fits on the rear ramp of a Marine KC-130 tanker/transport or both the US Air Force AC-130W "Stinger II" and AC-130J "Ghostrider" gunship variants.

Griffin Block II B is a short-range, rocket-powered air-to-surface or surface-to-surface missile that can be fired from UAVs as well as helicopters, attack aircraft, U.S. Air Force AC-130W gunships, and Marine Corps KC-130J tankers.

The missile's folding fins allow it to be launched from a 5.5 in (140 mm) tube. It can be set to engage the target with height of burst, point detonation or fuze delay. The U.S. Navy has tested the Griffin as a shipboard missile guided by laser at fast-moving small boats; they planned to use it on the Littoral Combat Ships. The missile version is less than half the weight of a Hellfire round and includes a 13 lb (5.9 kg) warhead. It has a range of 9.3 miles (15.0 km) when air-launched, or 3.4 miles (5.5 km) when launched from the surface. It has been fired from the U.S. Army Remote weapon station, multi-round Wedge Launcher, Smart Launcher and Kiowa Warrior manned helicopters.

The missile is smaller than the Hellfire typically used by armed UAVs, which reduces the potential for collateral damage. The Griffin missile and launch assembly is also lighter than the Hellfire, allowing more to be mounted on the Predator. Three Griffins can be carried in place of one Hellfire.

In 70 months of production from 2008 to early February 2014, Raytheon delivered 2,000 Griffin missiles. In late February 2014, Raytheon demonstrated the improved Griffin Block III missile, hitting static and moving targets. The Block III includes an improved semi-active laser seeker with better electronics and signal processing and a new Multi-Effects Warhead System to maximize lethality against different targets.

=== Naval use ===
Raytheon developed an extended-range version of the Griffin for integration onto Littoral Combat Ships. The Sea Griffin has a new motor and guidance system to increase its firing range from an LCS. Raytheon faced competition in equipping the LCS with a missile, as the Navy looked for other vendors. Competition came from MBDA with the Sea Spear version of its Brimstone missile. Both missiles are intended to give the LCS protection from small boat swarm attacks. The Navy instead selected the AGM-114L Hellfire to equip the LCS. The decision was made from the ship's use of the Saab's Sea Giraffe radar. While each Griffin requires a semi-active laser to paint a target, so a volley of them can only engage one target at a time, the Longbow Hellfire missiles can use the ship's and their own millimeter wave radar to separately track and engage multiple targets at the same time.

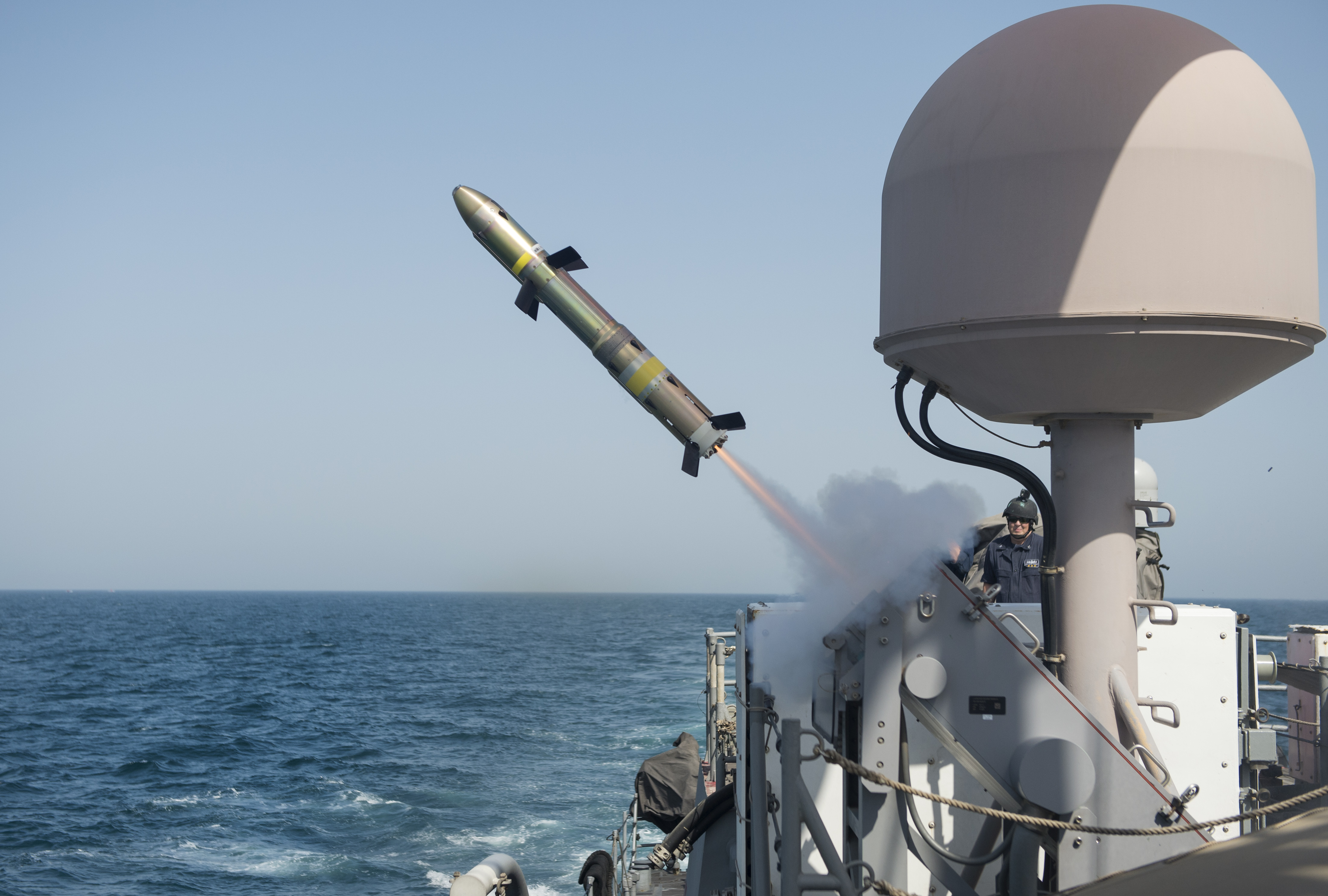
USS Firebolt (PC-10) fires a BGM-176B missile in June 2015.

The MK-60 Patrol Coastal Griffin Missile System achieved initial operational capability (IOC) with the U.S. Navy in March 2014, which is intended to provide protection for vessels in littoral areas against swarm boat attacks and other threats. The MK-60 includes the Griffin missile, a laser targeting system, a Navy-designed launcher, and a battle management system. Each Mk-60 can launch four missiles, and a patrol ship has two MK-60 launchers on board. The U.S. Navy began installing Griffin missiles on Patrol Craft in 2013; as of May 2014, four were outfitted with Griffin missile systems, with plans to equip ten PCs by 2016. When mounted on a ship, the missile is designated the BGM-176B. Arming PCs with Griffin missiles adds a layer of defense to the ships beyond the range of their 25 mm gun mounts, out to 4.5 km (2.8 mi), and also provides 360-degree coverage; the missiles' thrust-vectoring engines can move the missile to its target even when launched vertically. Installation onto a PC involves adding the launcher and weapons control system, the BRITE Star II sensor/laser designator, and the Griffin B Block II missile in a process taking one month.

Raytheon is continuing to fund the development of the Sea Griffin to extend the missile's range. The Sea Griffin will use a dual-mode seeker with an imaging infrared seeker and semi-active laser guidance, and a data-link to track multiple threats simultaneously and give it a fire-and-forget capability. The new seeker and an extended-range rocket motor, which will add 20 lb (9.1 kg), will increase the range of the Sea Griffin to 9.3 miles (15.0 km). In tests, the Sea Griffin's new imaging infrared (IIR) seeker has streamed video back to operators through the data-link to provide verification before the missile strikes the target. Its In-Flight Target Update (IFTU) capability allows it to be redirected to a new target in mid-flight, a vital feature against swarming small boats moving between friendly forces and neutral shipping. The Sea Griffin has been renamed the Griffin C.

== Variants ==
- AGM-176 Griffin A: Initial version without a rocket motor. Glide bomb for use from aircraft and drones.
- AGM-176 Griffin B: 1st series version with rocket motor. For use from aircraft, helicopters, drones and vehicles. Range 3.7 miles (6.0 km).
- BGM-176 Griffin C (Sea Griffin): Version with infrared-seeker head and 2-way-data link. Range 9.3 miles (15.0 km).
- AGM-176 Griffin C-er: version with a stronger rocket motor. Range 14.3 miles (23.0 km).

== Launch platforms ==
- MQ-1 Predator
- MQ-9 Reaper
- A-29 Super Tucano
- KC-130J Harvest HAWK
- MC-130W Dragon Spear
- Cyclone-class patrol ship
- AC-130J "Ghostrider"
- AC-130W "Stinger II"
- V-22 Osprey
- MC-145B Wily Coyote

== Users ==
- USA
