= USS Whirlwind (PC-11) =

Cyclone-class patrol ship

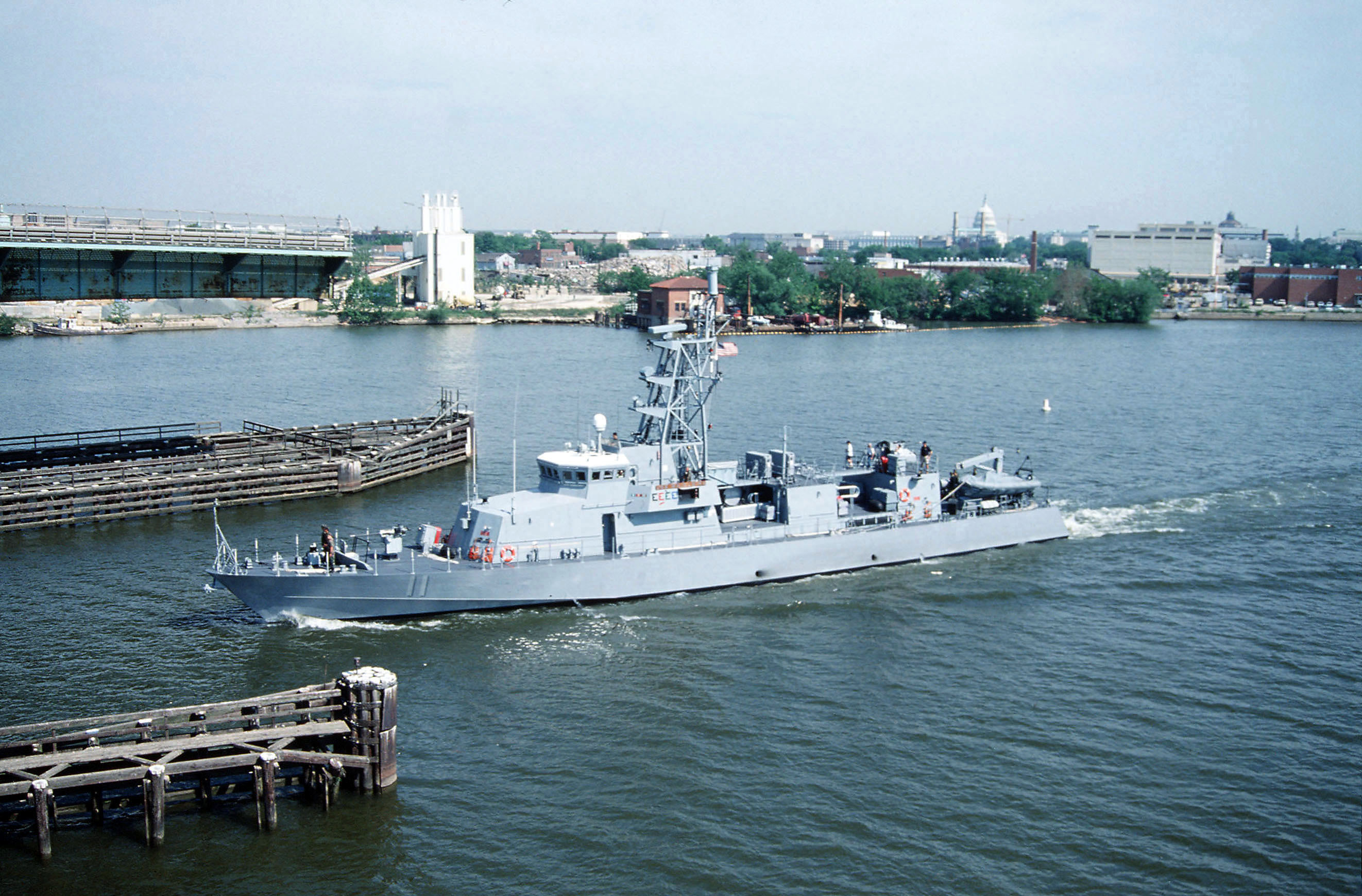
- USS Whirlwind (PC-11)

History

United States
- Name: Whirlwind
- Namesake: Whirlwind
- Ordered: 19 July 1991
- Builder: Bollinger Shipyards, Lockport, Louisiana
- Laid down: 4 March 1994
- Launched: 9 September 1994
- Acquired: 11 April 1995
- Commissioned: 1 July 1995
- Decommissioned: 21 March 2022
- Home port: Manama, Bahrain
- Motto: Second To None
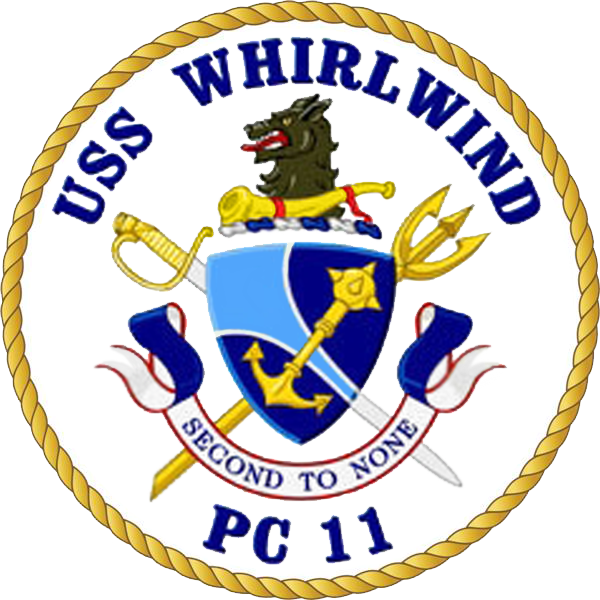
- Badge

Bahrain
- Name: RBNS Al-Sakeer; (الصقر)
- Acquired: 30 March 2022
- Identification: Hull number (74)
- Status: In service

General characteristics
- Class & type: Cyclone-class patrol ship
- Displacement: 331 tons
- Length: 174 ft (53 m)
- Beam: 25 ft (7.6 m)
- Draught: 7.5 ft (2.3 m)
- Speed: 35 knots (65 km/h; 40 mph)
- Complement: 4 officers, 24 men, 8 Special Forces
- Armament: (USN) 2 Mk38 chain guns; 2 Mk19 grenade launchers; 2 .50 (12.7 mm) machine guns; 6 Stinger missiles

USS Whirlwind (PC-11) was the eleventh Cyclone-class patrol ship. Whirlwind was laid down on 4 March 1994 by Bollinger Shipyards, Lockport, Louisiana, and launched on 9 September 1994. She was commissioned on 1 July 1995 in Memphis, Tennessee. On 21 March 2022, Whirlwind was decommissioned at Naval Support Activity Bahrain. On 30 March 2022, she was commissioned by the Bahraini Navy as RBNS Al-Farooq.

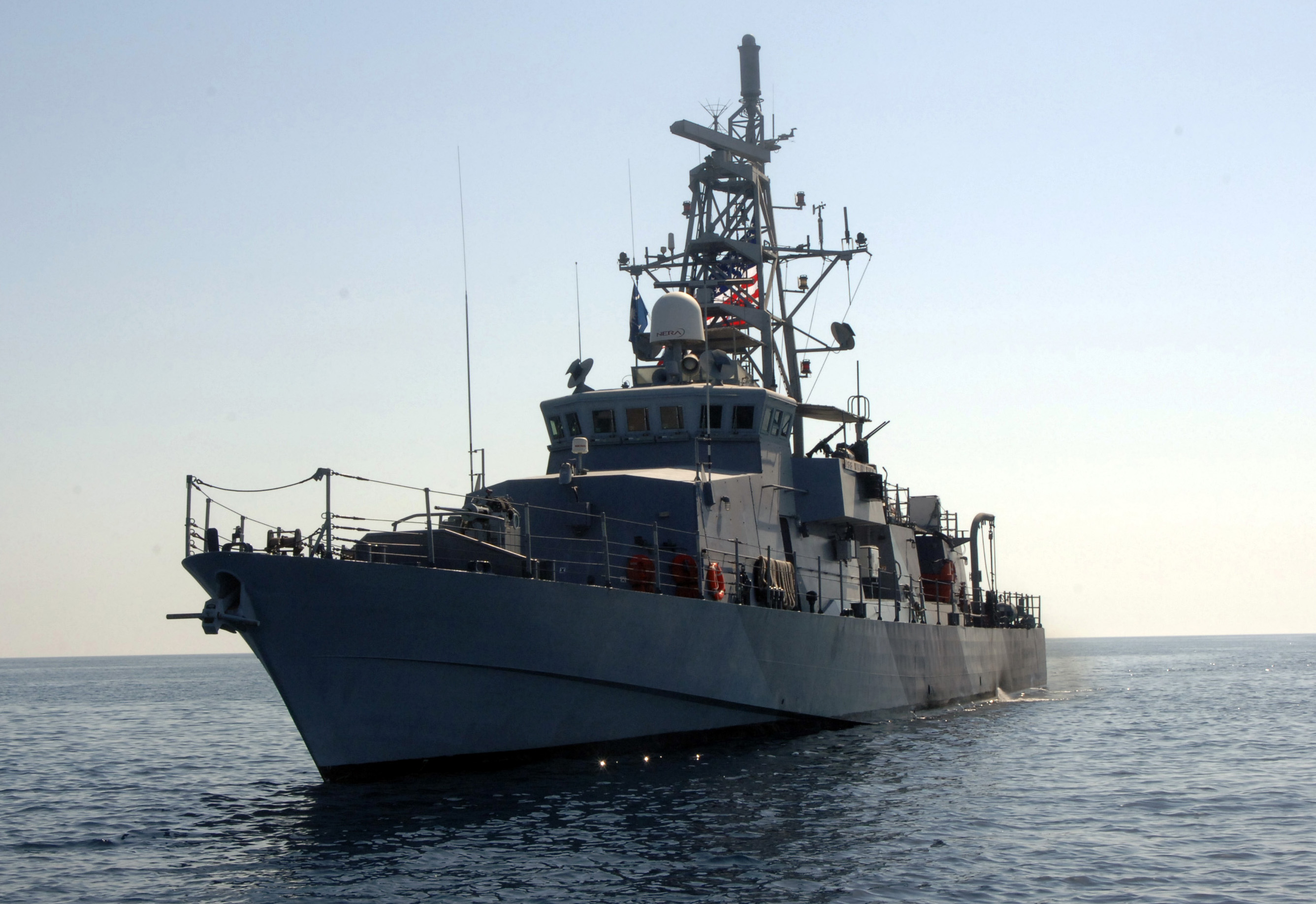
USS Whirlwind in the Persian Gulf, October 2006
