= Cyclone-class patrol ship =

US Navy small coastal defense vessel

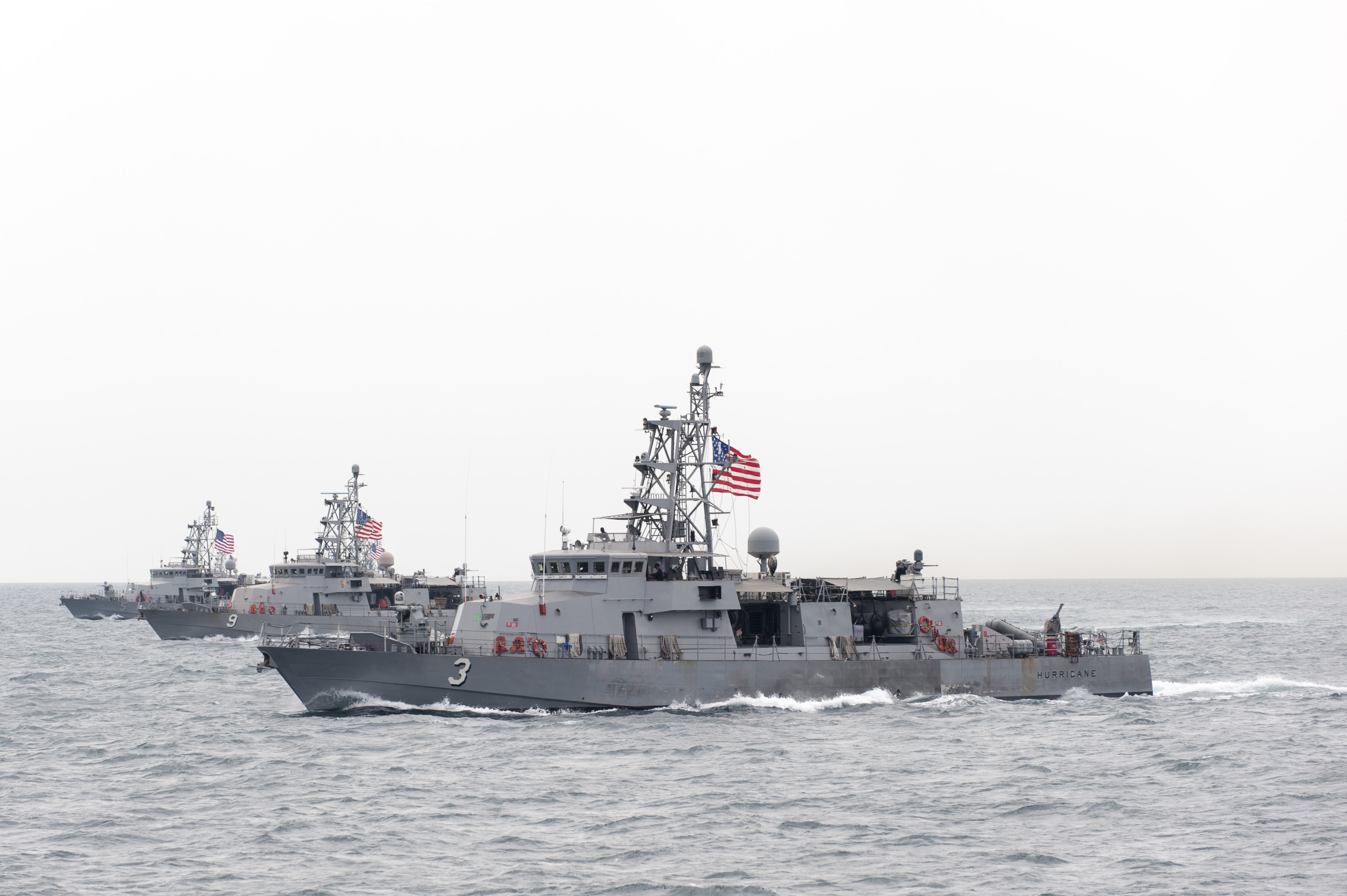
- USS Hurricane, USS Typhoon and USS Chinook, in the Persian Gulf in March 2015.

Class overview
- Builders: Bollinger Shipyards
- Operators: Royal Bahraini Naval Force; Egyptian Navy; Philippine Navy; United States Navy (former); U.S. Coast Guard (former)
- In commission: 1993–2023 (US Navy, US Coast Guard); 2004–present (Philippine Navy); 2022–present (Royal Bahrain Naval Forces); 2023–present (Egyptian Navy)
- Planned: 16
- Completed: 14
- Canceled: 2
- Active: 5 (Royal Bahrain Naval Forces); 3 (Egyptian Navy); 3 (Philippine Navy)
- Retired: 1 - available for sale to foreign military; 2 - sunk as an artificial reef

General characteristics
- Type: Coastal patrol ship
- Displacement: 328.5 long tons (333.8 t) (light load); 331 long tons (336 t)
- Length: 179 ft (55 m)
- Beam: 25 ft (7.6 m)
- Draft: 7.5 ft (2.3 m)
- Installed power: 4 × Paxman 16RP200- 1-CM 3,350 shp (2,500 kW) diesel engines; (13,400 shp (10,000 kW) combined)
- Propulsion: 4 × shafts, Reintjes reverse reduction gear box
- Speed: 35 kn (65 km/h; 40 mph)
- Range: 2,000–2,500 nmi (3,700–4,600 km; 2,300–2,900 mi) at 12 kn (22 km/h; 14 mph)
- Crew: 4 officers, 24 enlisted personnel
- Armament: 2 × 25 mm (0.98 in) MK 38 autocannon; 2 × .50 in (12.7 mm) caliber machine guns; 2 × 40 mm (1.6 in) MK 19 automatic grenade launchers; 2 × 7.62 mm (0.30 in) M240B machine guns; 6 × FIM-92 Stinger SAMs; 2 × MK-60 quadruple BGM-176B Griffin B missile launchers

The Cyclone-class patrol ships are a class of coastal patrol boats, formerly in service with the United States Navy. Most of these ships, named for weather phenomena, were launched between 1992 and 1994. The primary mission of these ships is coastal patrol and interdiction surveillance, an important aspect of littoral operations outlined in the Navy's strategy, "Forward...From the Sea." These ships also provided full mission support for U.S. Navy SEALs and other special operations forces. Several ships of the class were transferred to the U.S. Coast Guard (USCG) for a time and then later returned.

The Cyclone-class ships were assigned to United States Naval Special Warfare Command. Of the 14 ships, nine originally operated out of the Naval Amphibious Base Little Creek, Norfolk, Virginia, and four originally operated from the Naval Amphibious Base Coronado. These ships provide Naval Special Warfare with a fast, reliable platform that can respond to emergency requirements in a low intensity conflict environment. Six ships were decommissioned and loaned to the Coast Guard. Lead ship Cyclone was on loan from 2000 to 2004, then transferred to the Philippine Navy. Monsoon was loaned to the USCG in 2004 and Tempest in 2005, with both then returned in 2008. Shamal, Tornado, and Zephyr were on loan from 2004 to 2011. Upon return to the U.S. Navy they were all placed back in commission.

The ships that were on loan to the U.S. Coast Guard were used in a variety of roles, including search and rescue, interception, boarding, and inspection of foreign freighters arriving at United States ports.

In September 2010, the remaining ships of the class were recalled due to fatigue damage to their hulls. The class was designed for a lifespan of roughly 15 years. All but the newest member of the class, USS Tornado (PC-14), have been in service longer.

As of 2015, ten of the U.S. Navy's 13 Cyclone-class patrol ships were deployed to Naval Support Activity Bahrain in the Persian Gulf, to deal with a potential conflict with Iran. The remaining three ships of the class are slated to be transferred to Naval Station Mayport in Florida to primarily perform drug interdiction duties with U.S. Naval Forces Southern Command (USNAVSO) / U.S. Fourth Fleet.

In March 2023, the last of the ships in this class were decommissioned, and designated either for sale to a foreign military via FMS or to be scrapped.

== Development and design ==
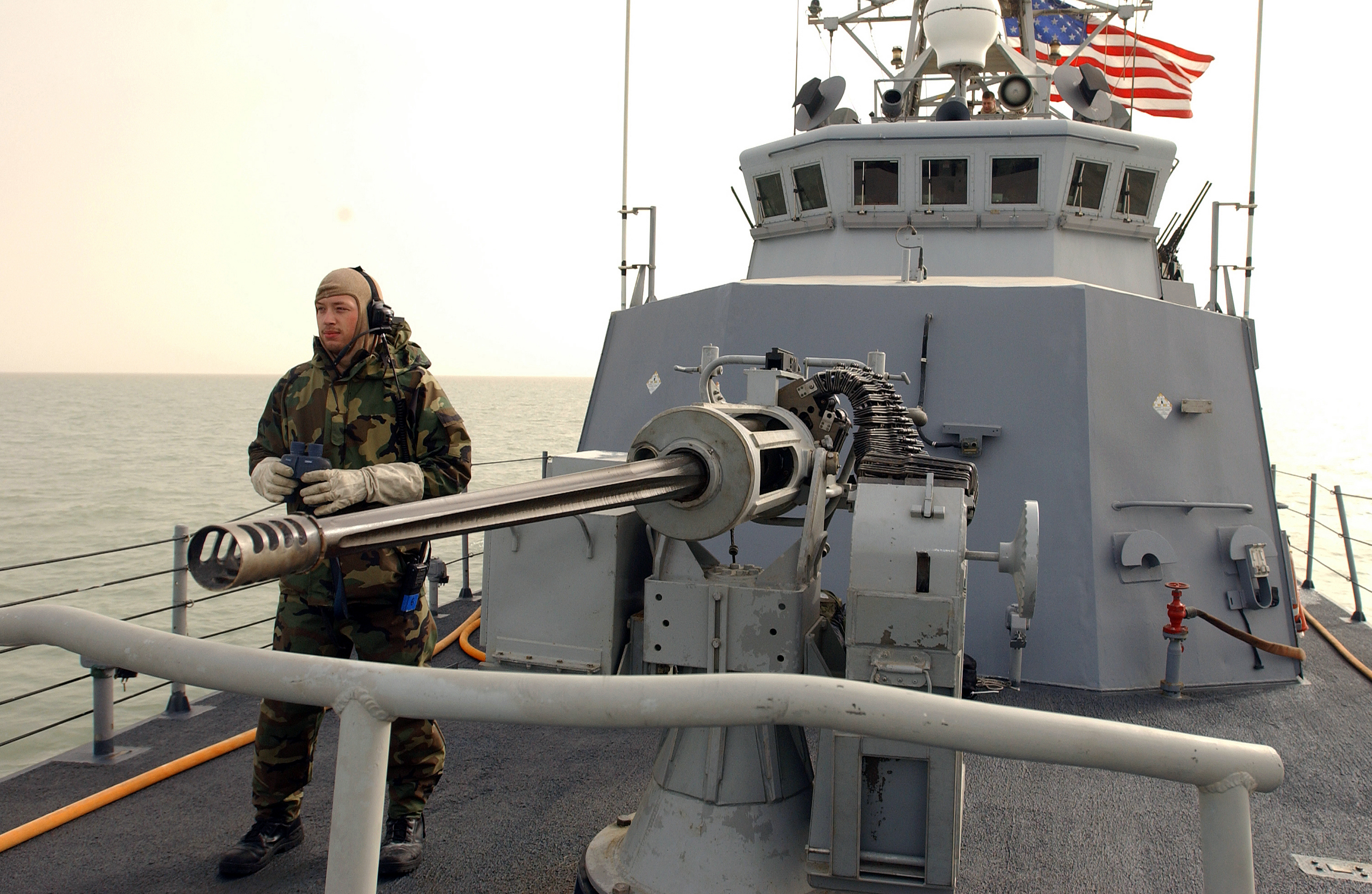
One of two 25mm autocannons aboard USS Chinook (PC-9).

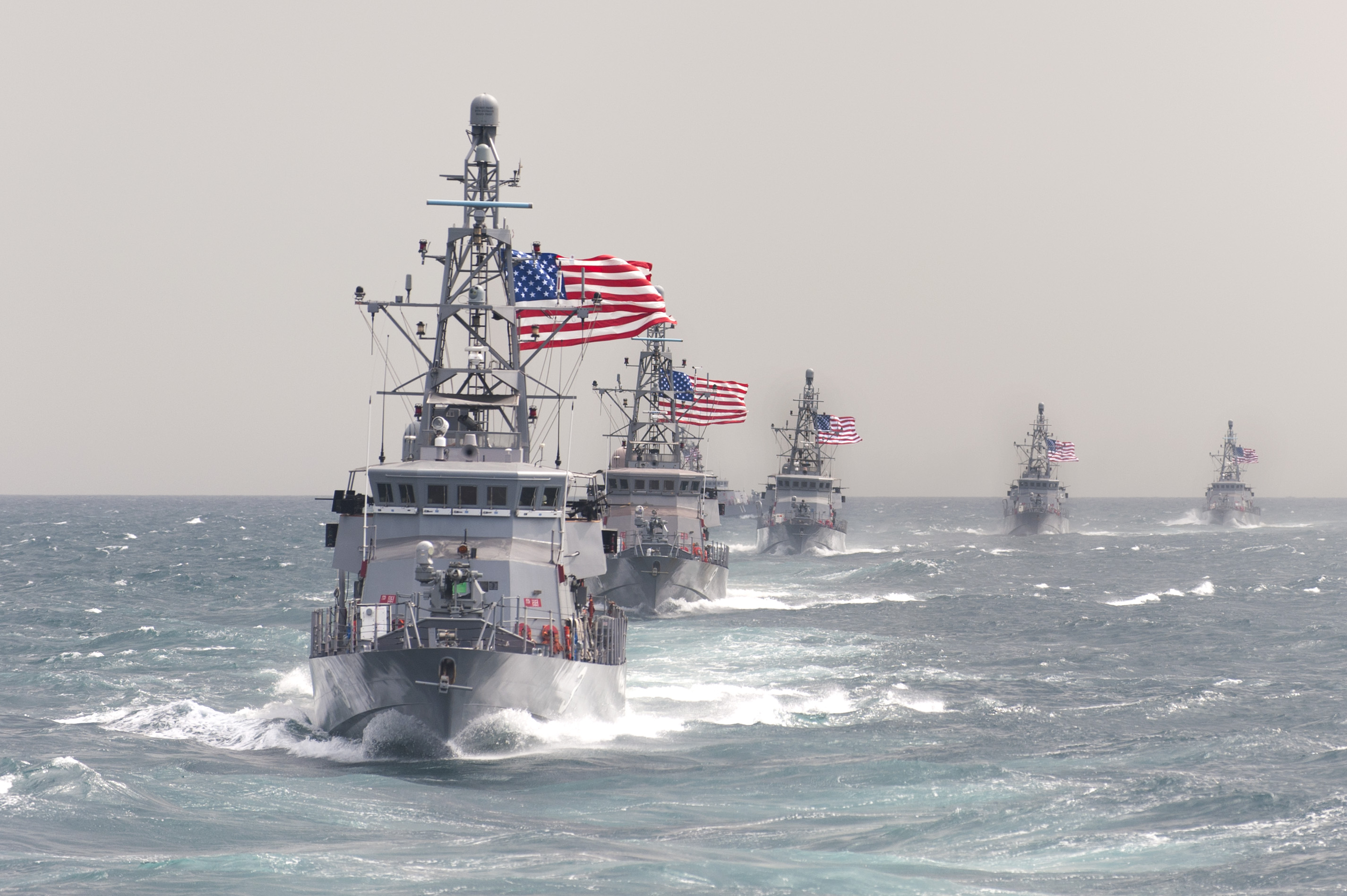
USS Hurricane (PC-3) leads six ships of Patrol Coastal Squadron 1 in the Persian Gulf, March 2015.

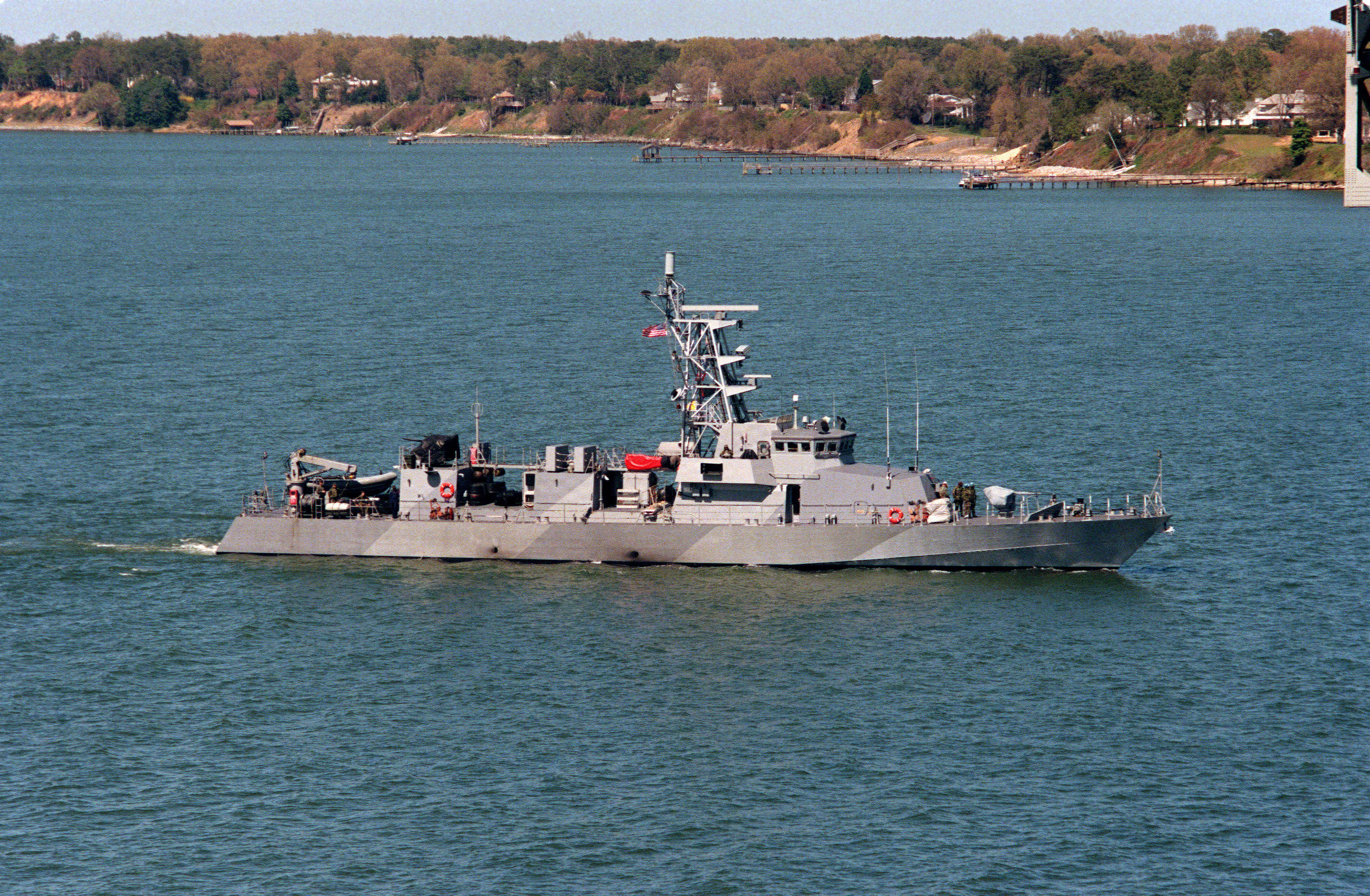
Cyclone-class patrol craft USS Firebolt (PC-10) passing the Naval Weapons Station Yorktown in Virginia, USA. This starboard side view shows the vessel's splinter camouflage scheme.

In the 1980s, the U.S. Navy developed a requirement for a replacement for the Vietnam War-era PB Mk III small (65 ft (20 m)) patrol boats used to transport SEAL teams. The first attempt to replace the PB Mk IIIs led to an order being placed in 1984 for a stealthy surface effect ship, the Special Warfare Craft, Medium, or SWCM, with a length of about 83 ft (25 m) and a displacement of 150 long tons (150 t). The SWCM, nicknamed "Sea Viking", was a failure, however, and construction of the prototype was abandoned in 1987.

After the failure of the innovative SWCM, it was decided to replace the PB Mk IIIs with a simple development of an existing design rather than wait for an entirely new design to be produced and developed. Bollinger Shipyards proposed a development of the Vosper Thornycroft Province-class fast attack craft built for Oman and Kenya, and this was selected by the U.S. Navy.

At 56.7 m (186 ft), the new design, at first designated PBC (Patrol Boat Coastal), and later PC, was much larger than the boats that they were to replace. It was planned to build 16 PBCs to replace the 17 PB Mk IIIs, with first deliveries expected in 1991. The program was stopped at 14 boats, however, as it was realised that the PC was too large for the SEAL delivery role.

== Operational career ==
Following the 2003 occupation of Iraq, the Cyclone-class boats were deployed to guard Iraq's offshore oil terminal. When Iraq took over responsibility for the terminal's defense, in 2005, ten of the Cyclone-class boats remained in the Persian Gulf, performing other patrol duties from its base in Manama, Bahrain.

On 30 March 2022, the Royal Bahrain Naval Forces commissioned five Cyclone-class patrol vessels that were decommissioned by the USN at Manama.

The U.S. Navy decommissioned the last two Cyclone-class patrol coastal ships stationed at Naval Support Activity Bahrain on 28 March 2023. These ships were transferred to Philippine Navy.

== Ships in class ==
| Ship | Hull No. | Commissioned– Decommissioned | Homeport | Status | NVR Page |
|---|---|---|---|---|---|
| Cyclone | PC-1 | 1993–2000 (USCG 2000–2004) | Philippines | Transferred to the U.S. Coast Guard in February 2000 as USCGC Cyclone (WPC-1), transferred to the Philippine Navy in March 2004. Now BRP General Mariano Alvarez (PS-176). | PC-1 |
| Tempest | PC-2 | 1993–2005 (USCG 2005-2008); 2008-2022 | Manama, Bahrain | Lent to the U.S. Coast Guard as USCGC Tempest (WPC-2), returned to Navy and recommissioned in 2008. Decommissioned on 7 March 2022. Transferred to the Royal Bahrain Naval Forces and commissioned on 30 March 2022 as RBNS Al-Gurairiyah. | PC-2 |
| Hurricane | PC-3 | 1993–2023 | Egypt | Transferred to Egyptian Navy on 21 March 2023 as ENS Khaled Bin Elwaled. | PC-3 |
| Monsoon | PC-4 | 1994–2008 (USCG 2004–2008); 2008-2023 | Philippines | Decommissioned on March 28, 2023, transferred to the Philippine Navy as BRP Valentin Diaz. | PC-4 |
| Typhoon | PC-5 | 1994–2022 | Manama, Bahrain | Decommissioned on 14 March 2022. Transferred to the Royal Bahrain Naval Forces and commissioned on 30 March 2022, now RBNS Damsah. | PC-5 |
| Sirocco | PC-6 | 1994–2023 | Egypt | Transferred to Egyptian Navy on 21 March 2023 as ENS Amr Bin Elaas. | PC-6 |
| Squall | PC-7 | 1994–2022 | Manama, Bahrain | Decommissioned on 14 March 2022. Transferred to the Royal Bahrain Naval Forces and commissioned on 30 March 2022 as RBNS Al-Farooq. | PC-7 |
| Zephyr | PC-8 | 1994–2004 (USCG 2004-2011); 2011-2021 | Mayport, Florida | Decommissioned on 17 February 2021, and scuttled off the coast of Florida as an artificial reef on March 23rd, 2026. | PC-8 |
| Chinook | PC-9 | 1995–2023 | Philippines | Decommissioned on March 28, 2023, transferred to the Philippine Navy as the BRP Ladislao Diwa. | PC-9 |
| Firebolt | PC-10 | 1995–2022 | Manama, Bahrain | Decommissioned on 23 February 2022. Transferred to the Royal Bahrain Naval Forces and commissioned on 30 March 2022, now RBNS Jenan. | PC-10 |
| Whirlwind | PC-11 | 1995–2022 | Manama, Bahrain | Decommissioned on 21 March 2022. Transferred to the Royal Bahrain Naval Forces and commissioned on 30 March 2022, now RBNS Al Sakheer. | PC-11 |
| Thunderbolt | PC-12 | 1995–2023 | Egypt | Transferred to Egyptian Navy on 21 March 2023 as ENS Salah El Den Ayoby. | PC-12 |
| Shamal | PC-13 | 1996–2004 (USCG 2004-2011); 2011-2021 | Mayport, Florida | Decommissioned on 16 February 2021, and scuttled off the coast of Florida as an artificial reef on March 21st, 2026. | PC-13 |
| Tornado | PC-14 | 2000–2004 (USCG 2004-2011); 2011-2021 | Mayport, Florida | Decommissioned on 18 February 2021. Currently awaiting sale to a foreign military partner. | PC-14 |

Zephyr, Shamal, and Tornado were homeported at Joint Expeditionary Base Little Creek (Virginia) but shifted homeport to Naval Station Mayport (Florida). All three were decommissioned in February 2021. Zephyr and Shamal were sunk as artificial reefs while Tornado is waiting for a sale to a foreign military.

== Users ==
=== Current ===
- Royal Bahraini Naval Force (5)
- Egyptian Navy (3)
- Philippine Navy (3)

=== Former ===
- United States Navy (14)
- United States Coast Guard (6 on loan)

== See also ==
- Mark V Special Operations Craft
- Special Operations Craft – Riverine (SOC-R)
- Mark VI patrol boat
- List of patrol vessels of the United States Navy

== Sources ==
- Baker, A.D. The Naval Institute Guide to Combat Fleets of the World 1998–1999. Annapolis, Maryland: Naval Institute Press, 1998. ISBN 1-55750-111-4.
- Gardiner, Robert and Stephen Chumbley. Conway's All The World's Fighting Ships 1947–1995. Annapolis, Maryland USA: Naval Institute Press, 1995. ISBN 1-55750-132-7.
- Moore, John. Jane's Fighting Ships 1985–86. London: Jane's Yearbooks, 1985. ISBN 0 7106-0814-4.
- Prézelin, Bernard and Baker, A.D. The Naval Institute Guide to Combat Fleets of the World 1990/1991. Annapolis, Maryland, USA: Naval Institute Press, 1990. ISBN 0-87021-250-8.
