= USS Tornado =

1999 Cyclone-class patrol ship

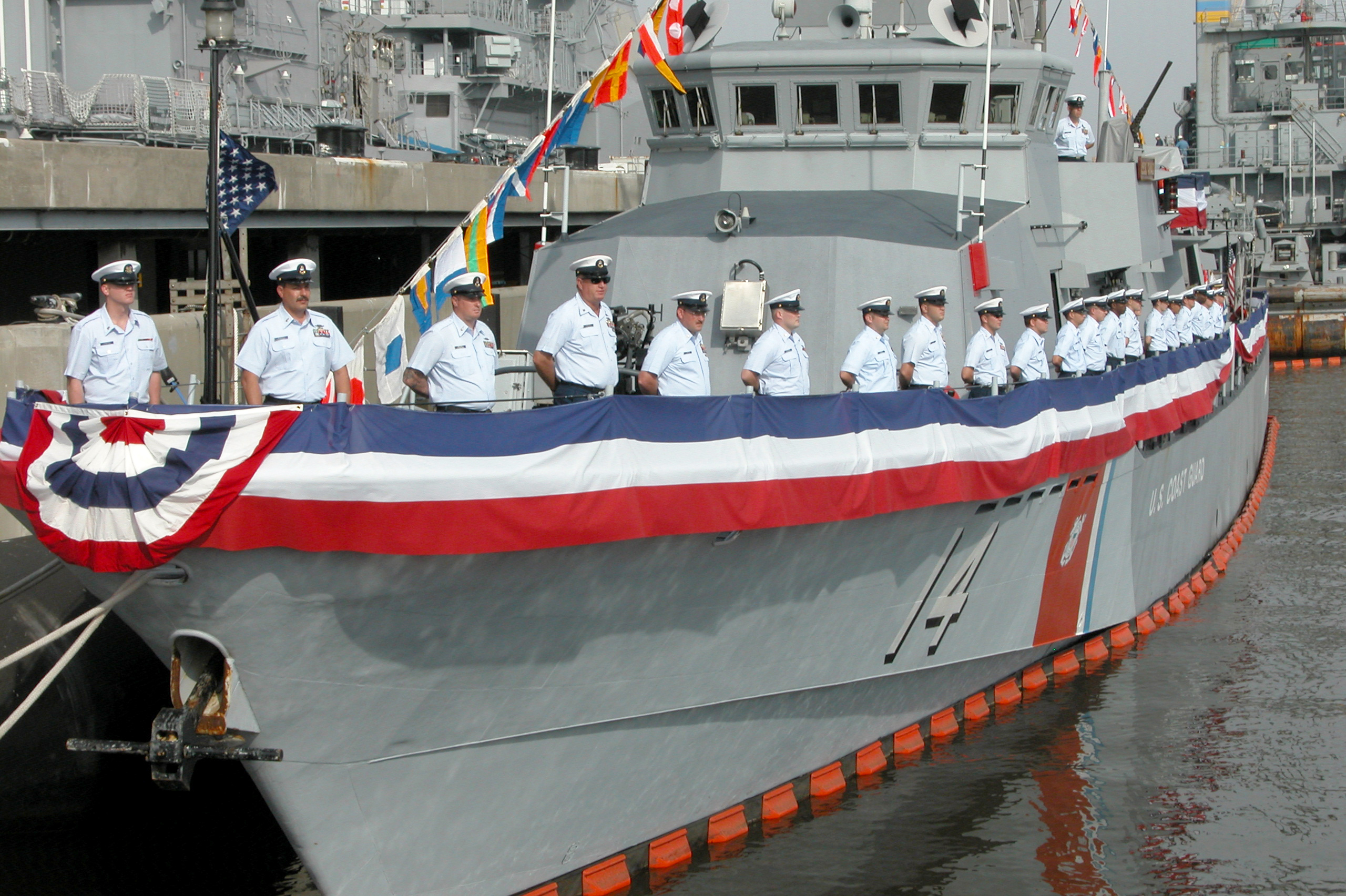
- USCGC Tornado (WPC-14) in U.S. Coast Guard service in 2004

History

→ United States
- Name: Tornado
- Namesake: Tornado
- Ordered: 14 August 1997
- Builder: Bollinger Shipyards, Lockport, Louisiana
- Laid down: 25 August 1998
- Launched: 7 June 1999
- Acquired: 13 March 2000
- Commissioned: 24 June 2000
- Decommissioned: 1 October 2004
- Recommissioned: 30 September 2011
- Decommissioned: 18 February 2021
- Identification: MMSI number: 369987000; Callsign: NTDO
- Motto: Focused Precision
- Status: Decommissioned, awaiting transfer to a foreign military partner
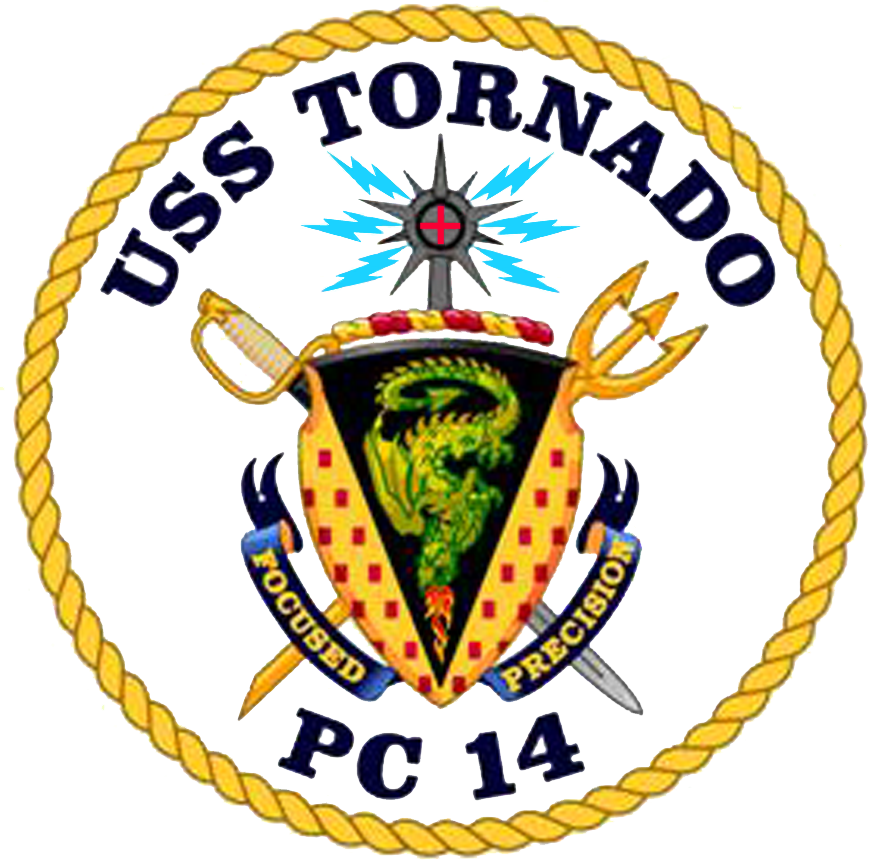
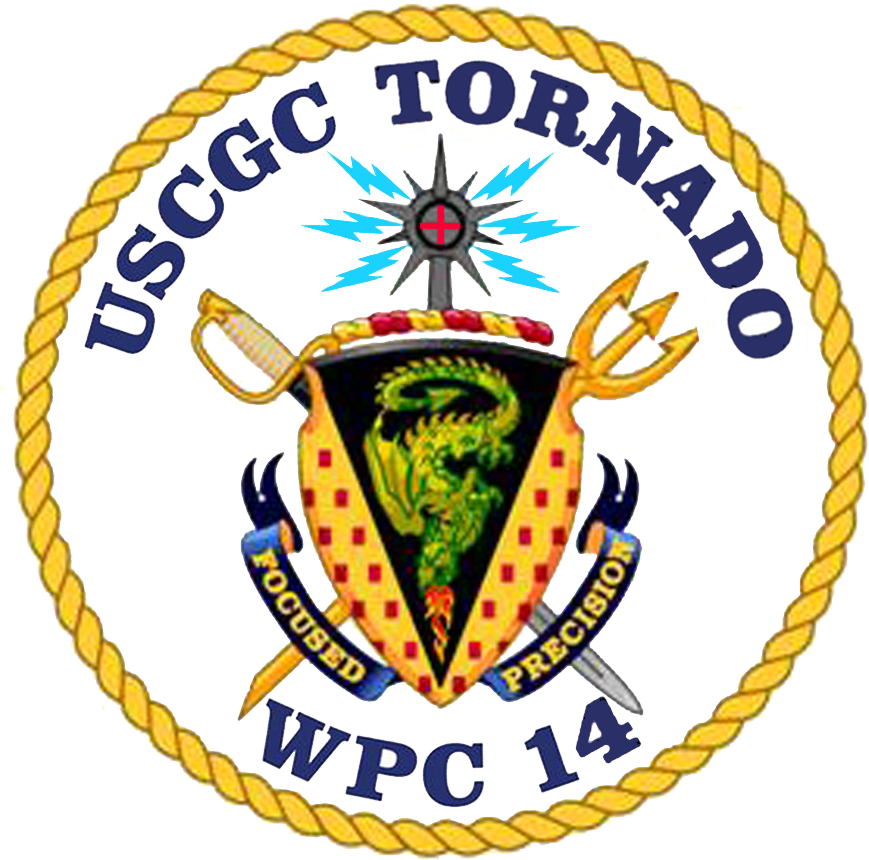
- Badge

General characteristics
- Class & type: Cyclone-class patrol ship
- Displacement: 331 tons
- Length: 179 ft (55 m)
- Beam: 25 ft (7.6 m)
- Draught: 7.5 ft (2.3 m)
- Installed power: 2 CAT Marine SSDG
- Propulsion: 4 Paxman Valenta Diesel Engines
- Speed: 31 knots
- Boats & landing craft carried: USCG Over the Horizon
- Crew: 3 officers, 2 chiefs, 25 enlisted
- Armament: 2 × Mk38 chain guns (USN); 2 × Mk19 grenade launchers; 2 × .50 (12.7 mm) machine guns; 6 × Stinger missiles

USS Tornado (PC-14) is the fourteenth and last Cyclone-class patrol ships, notable for being the only ship in the class designed with shaping features for signature management. She was laid down by Bollinger Shipyards, Lockport, Louisiana 25 August 1998 and launched 7 June 1999. She was commissioned by the United States Navy 24 June 2000, decommissioned 1 October 2004 and transferred to the United States Coast Guard as USCGC Tornado (WPC-14).

== Background ==
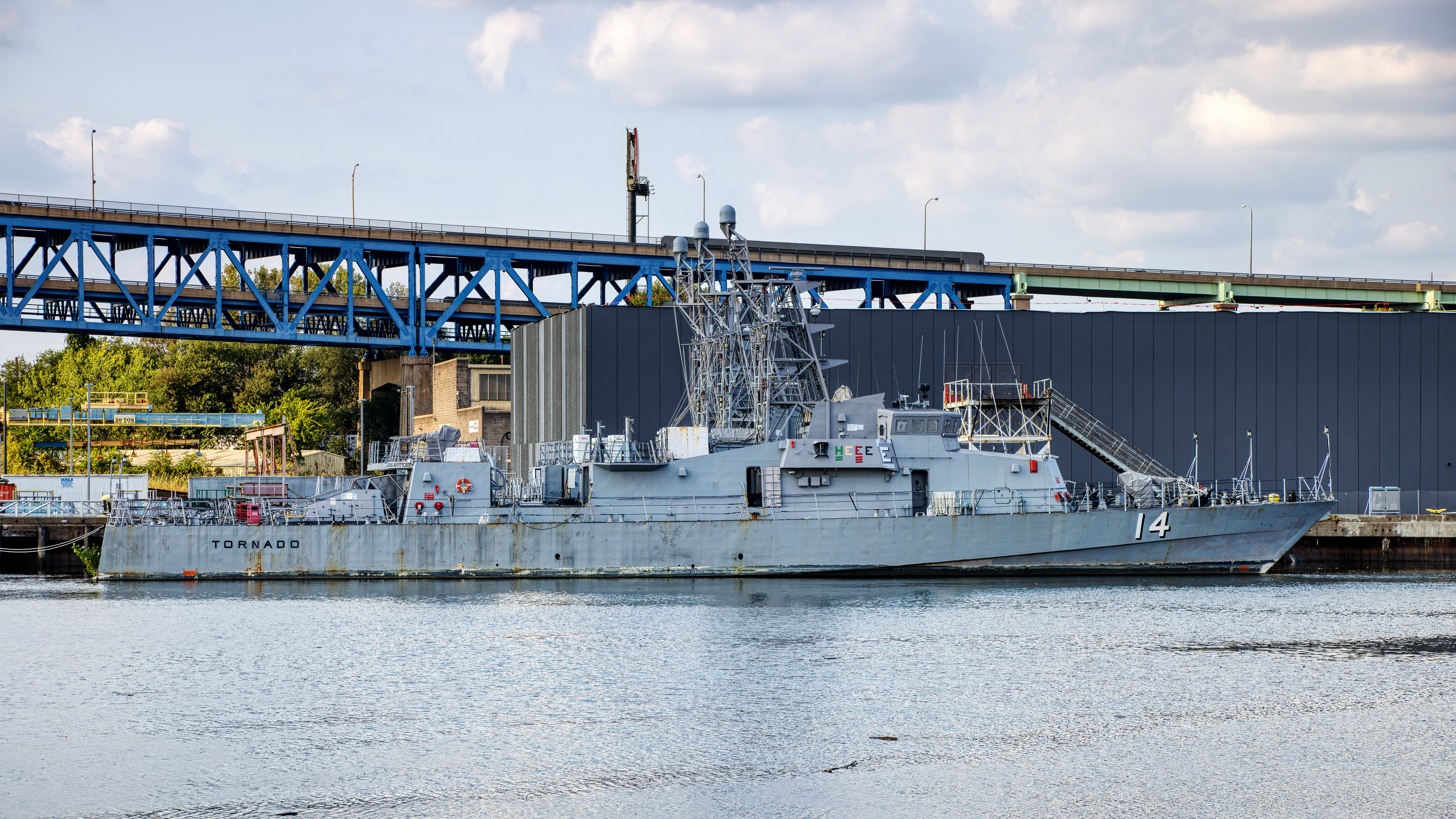
Tornado moored along with three sister ships, in Philadelphia, September 2022

The primary mission of Cyclone class was to serve as a platform for maritime special operations, including interdiction, escort, non-combatant evacuation, reconnaissance, operational deception, intelligence collection, and tactical swimmer operations. Her small size, stealthy construction, and high speed were tailored to performing long-range Special Operations Forces (SOF) insertion and extraction and other SOF support duties, in particular U.S. Navy Seals.

The ship's operational capabilities were designed to meet the unique requirements of special warfare missions. The Cyclone class are capable of accelerating from stop to 35 knots (65 km/h; 40 mph) in under three minutes, then move from full ahead to 15 knots (28 km/h; 17 mph) astern in 60 seconds. In high-speed, hard-over turns, the ship barely heeled as the automatic stabilizers engaged.

In the mid-1990s when Special Operations Command rejected them as too big for special operations missions and regular surface Navy dismissed them as too small for any of its missions, the Navy began looking for ways to phase out Tornado and her sister ships.

== Operational history ==
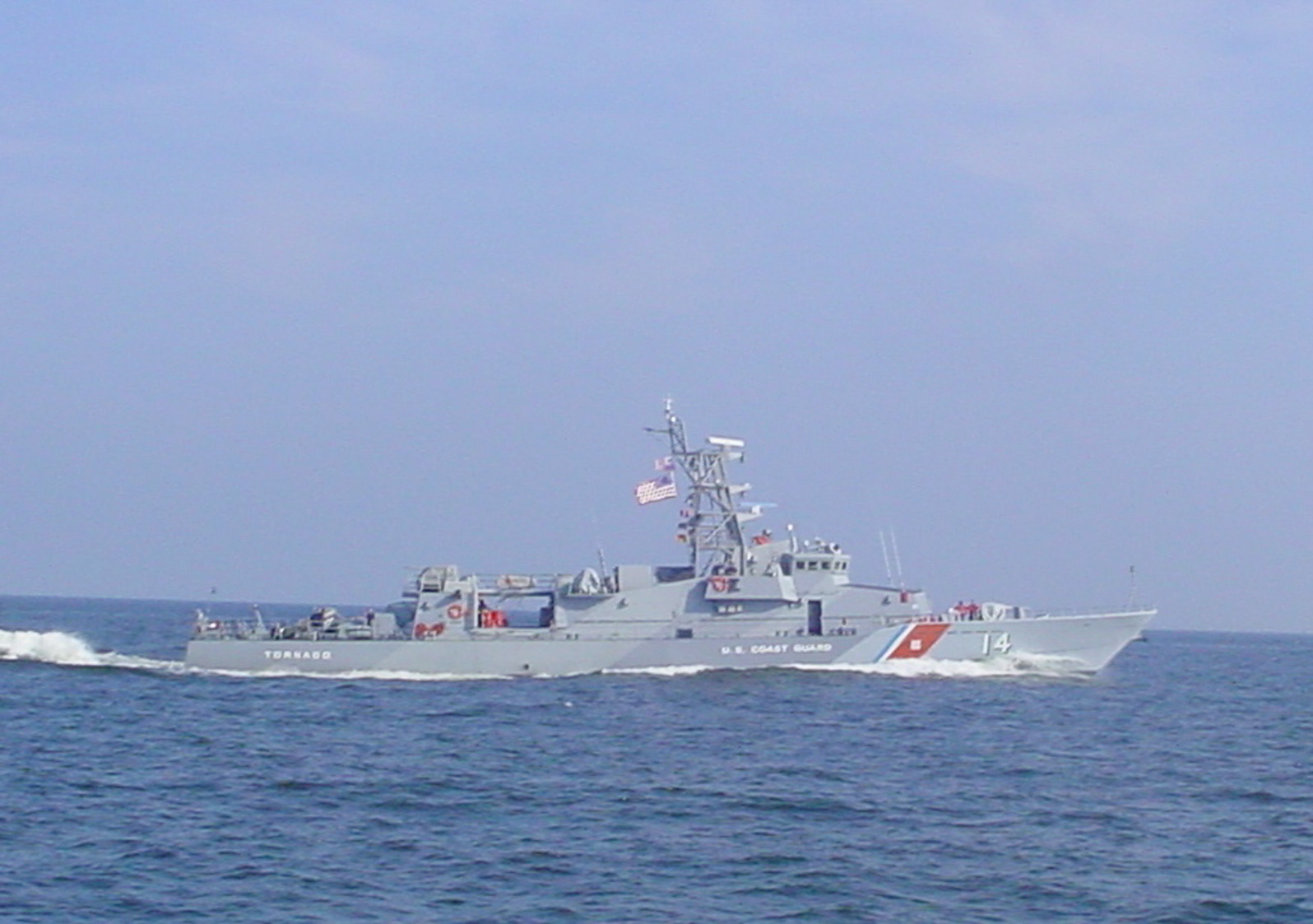
Tornado in the Gulf of Mexico, December 2004

She was commissioned by the United States Navy 24 June 2000, decommissioned 1 October 2004 and transferred to the United States Coast Guard as USCGC Tornado (WPC-14).

Tornado was transferred back to the Navy on 30 September 2011, and was once again designated PC-14.

As of January 2018, USS Tornado was the only Cyclone-class patrol ship that still uses the MK38 25 mm Mod 1 Gun System. She was also the only known ship left in the U.S. Navy with Mod 1 Gun System. She was also the only ship in the class with signature management features. USS Tornado also held the distinction, other than USS Constitution, of being the last active U.S. Navy warship with all crew served weapons. In October 2018, Tornado was a participant in the 2018 Baltimore Fleet Week.

On 1 March 2019 Tornado deployed for patrol in the 4th Fleet area of responsibility, her first deployment in over 5 years. In May 2019, Tornado participated in Fleet Week being docked at the United States Merchant Marine Academy.

Tornado was decommissioned on 18 February 2021 and is currently awaiting sale to a foreign military partner at the Inactive Ship Maintenance Facility in Philadelphia.
