= USS Squall =

1993 Cyclone-class patrol ship

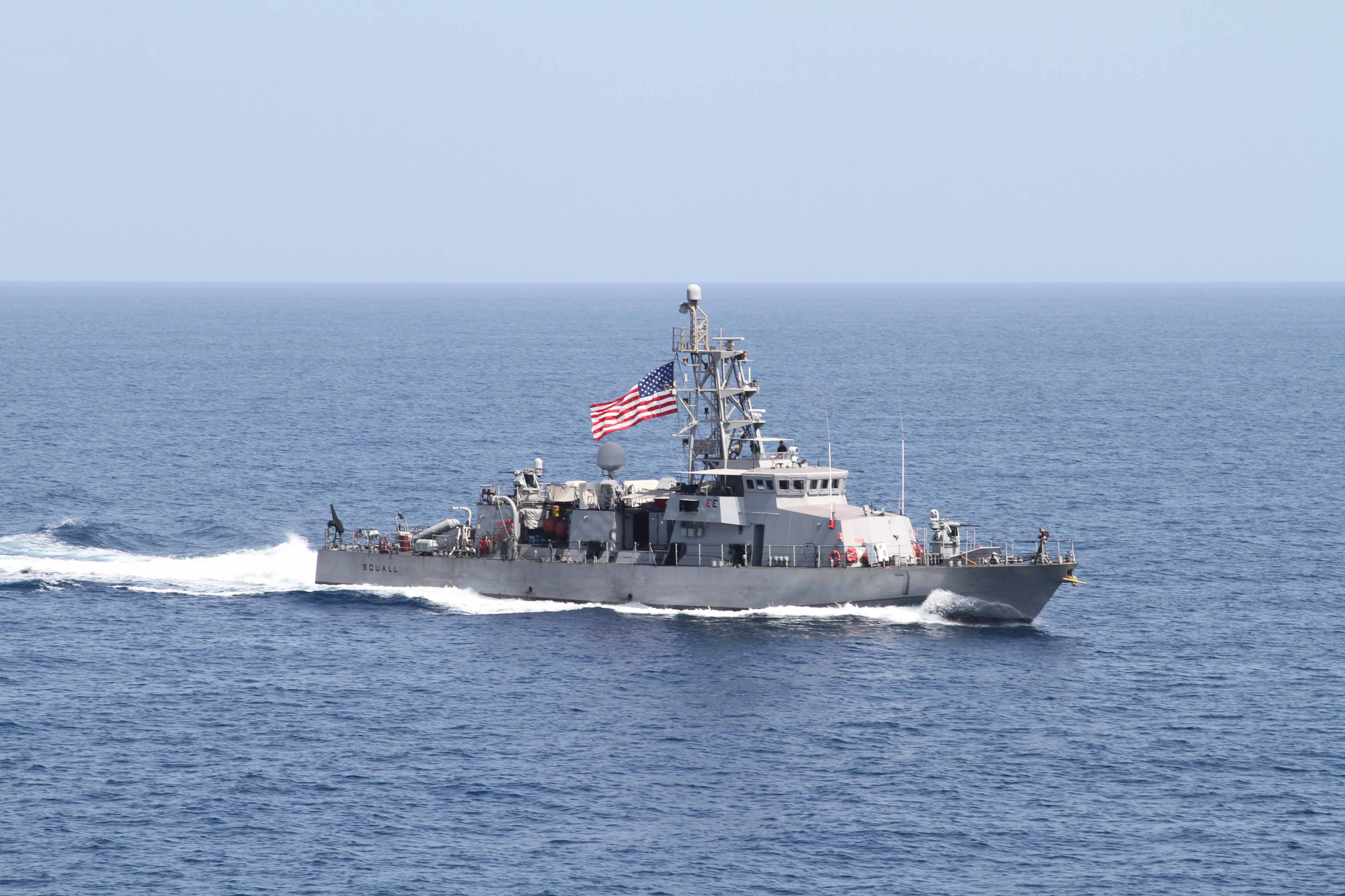
- USS Squall underway in the Arabian Sea on 10 September 2016

History

United States
- Name: Squall
- Namesake: Squall
- Ordered: 3 August 1990
- Builder: Bollinger Shipyards, Lockport, Louisiana
- Laid down: 17 February 1993
- Launched: 28 August 1993
- Acquired: 9 May 1994
- Commissioned: 4 July 1994
- Decommissioned: 14 March 2022
- Home port: Naval Support Activity Bahrain
- Motto: "Per Mare Per Terras" (By sea and land)
- Status: Decommissioned
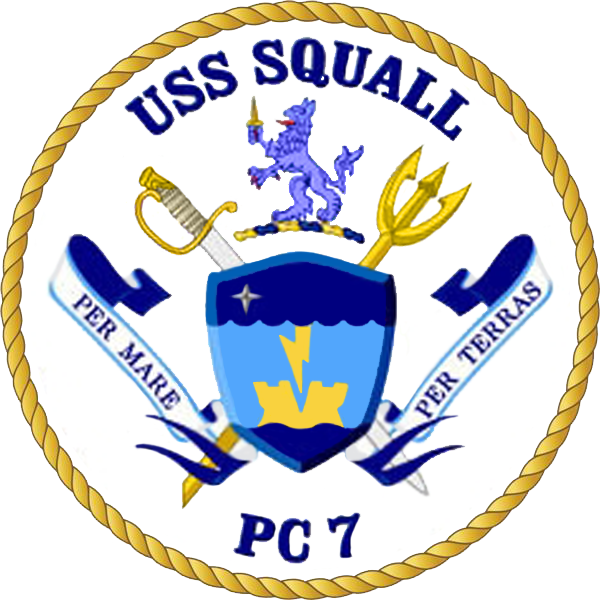
- Badge

Bahrain
- Name: RBNS Al-Farooq; (الفاروق)
- Acquired: 30 March 2022
- Identification: Hull number (72)
- Status: In service

General characteristics
- Class & type: Cyclone-class patrol ship
- Displacement: 331 tons
- Length: 174 ft (53 m)
- Beam: 25 ft (7.6 m)
- Draught: 7.5 ft (2.3 m)
- Speed: 35 knots (65 km/h; 40 mph)
- Complement: 4 officers, 24 ratings, 8 Special Forces
- Armament: (USN) 2 Mk38 chain guns; 2 Mk19 grenade launchers; 2 .50 (12.7 mm) machine guns; 6 Stinger missiles

USS Squall (PC-7) was the seventh Cyclone-class patrol ship. Squall was laid down 17 February 1993 by Bollinger Shipyards, Lockport, Louisiana and launched 28 August 1993. She was commissioned by the United States Navy 4 July 1994.

== Operational history ==
In 2013, Squall shifted homeport to Naval Support Activity Bahrain.

On August 24, 2016, while operating in the northern end of the Persian Gulf, the Squall fired three .50 caliber machine gun warning shots at an Iranian Revolutionary Guards boat which had been harassing the Squall, the USS Tempest and a ship of the Kuwaiti Navy. During the encounter, the Iranian boat closed within 200 yards (180 m) of the Tempest and ignored earlier warnings to leave the area conveyed by radio and loud speaker and reinforced with the firing of flares. In accordance with standard maritime procedure, the warning shots were fired into the water. The Iranian boat then left the area.

== Decommissioning and Bahraini service ==
Squall was decommissioned on 14 March 2022 at Naval Support Activity Bahrain. On 30 March 2022, she was commissioned by the Bahraini Navy as RBNS Al-Farooq.
