= USS Chinook (PC-9) =

Cyclone class patrol (coastal) ship

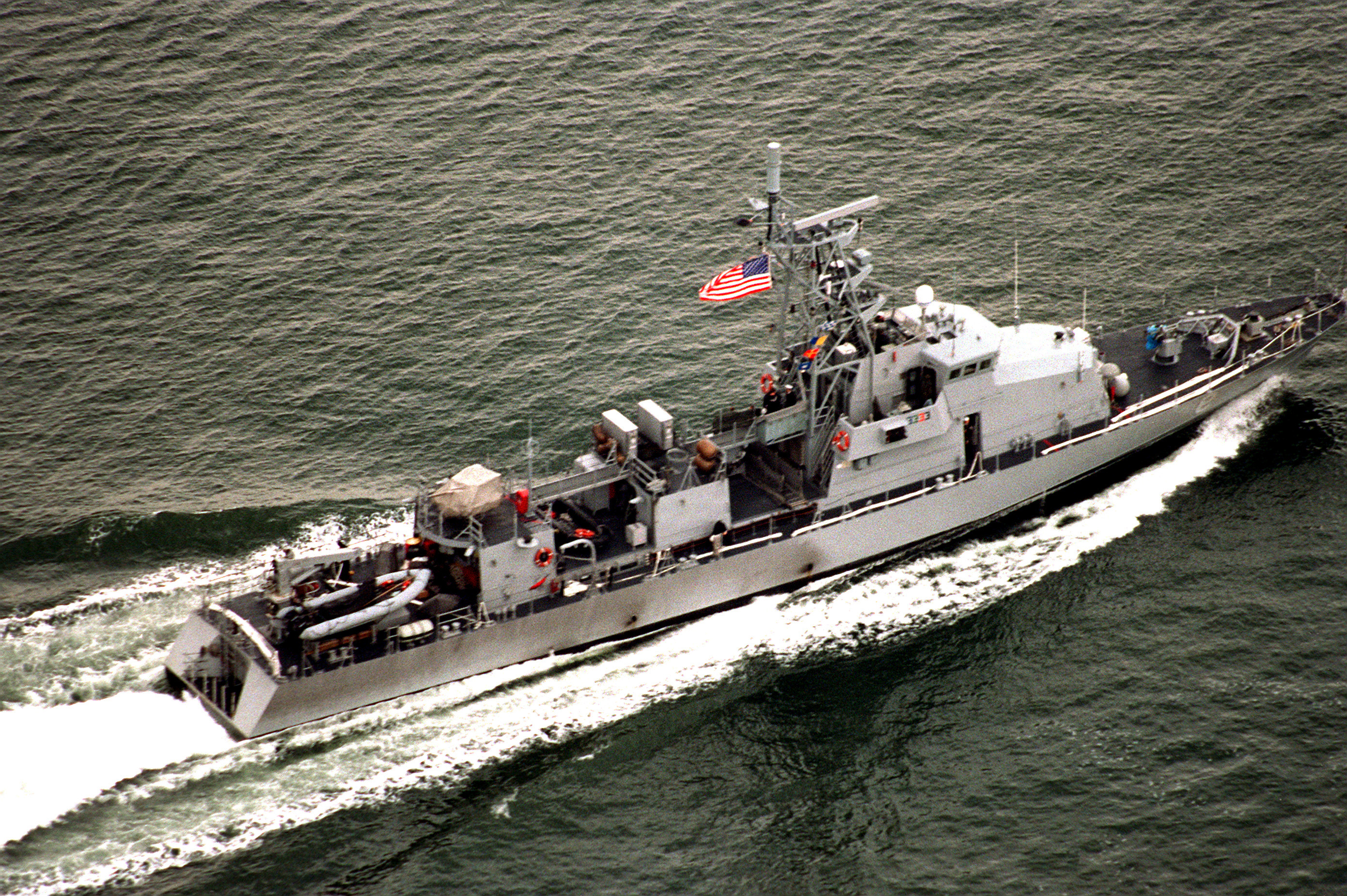
- USS Chinook (PC-9)

History

United States
- Name: Chinook
- Namesake: Chinook
- Operator: United States Navy
- Ordered: 19 July 1991
- Builder: Bollinger Shipyards, Lockport, Louisiana
- Laid down: 16 June 1993
- Launched: 26 February 1994
- Acquired: 7 October 1994
- Commissioned: 28 January 1995
- Decommissioned: 28 March 2023
- In service: 1995
- Home port: Manama, Bahrain
- Identification: PC-9
- Motto: "Stealth Courage Swiftness"
- Fate: Transferred to Philippine Navy
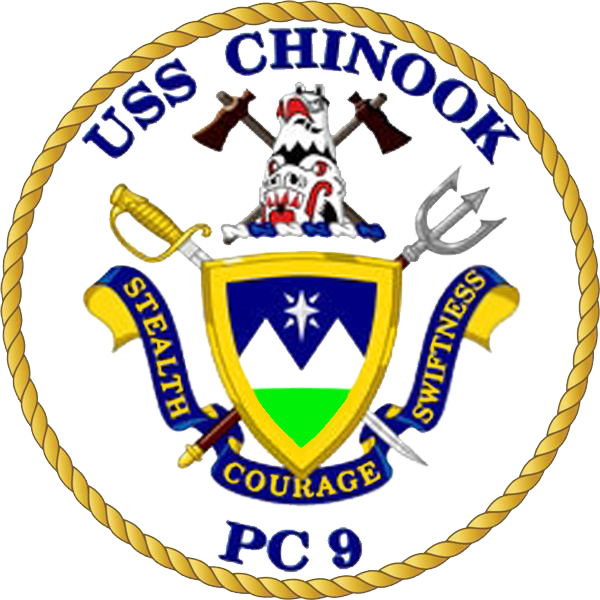
- Badge

General characteristics
- Class & type: Cyclone-class patrol ship
- Displacement: 331 tons
- Length: 174 ft (53 m)
- Beam: 25 ft (7.6 m)
- Draft: 7.5 ft (2.3 m)
- Propulsion: Four 3,350shp Paxman diesel engines, four shafts
- Speed: 35 knots (65 km/h; 40 mph)
- Boats & landing craft carried: Single RHIB Craft
- Troops: Eight Special Warfare Det. or USCG Det.
- Complement: 4 officers, 24 Enlisted
- Armament: (USN) 2 Mk38 chain guns; 2 Mk19 grenade launchers; 2 .50 (12.7 mm) machine guns; 6 Stinger missiles
- Aircraft carried: None
- Aviation facilities: None

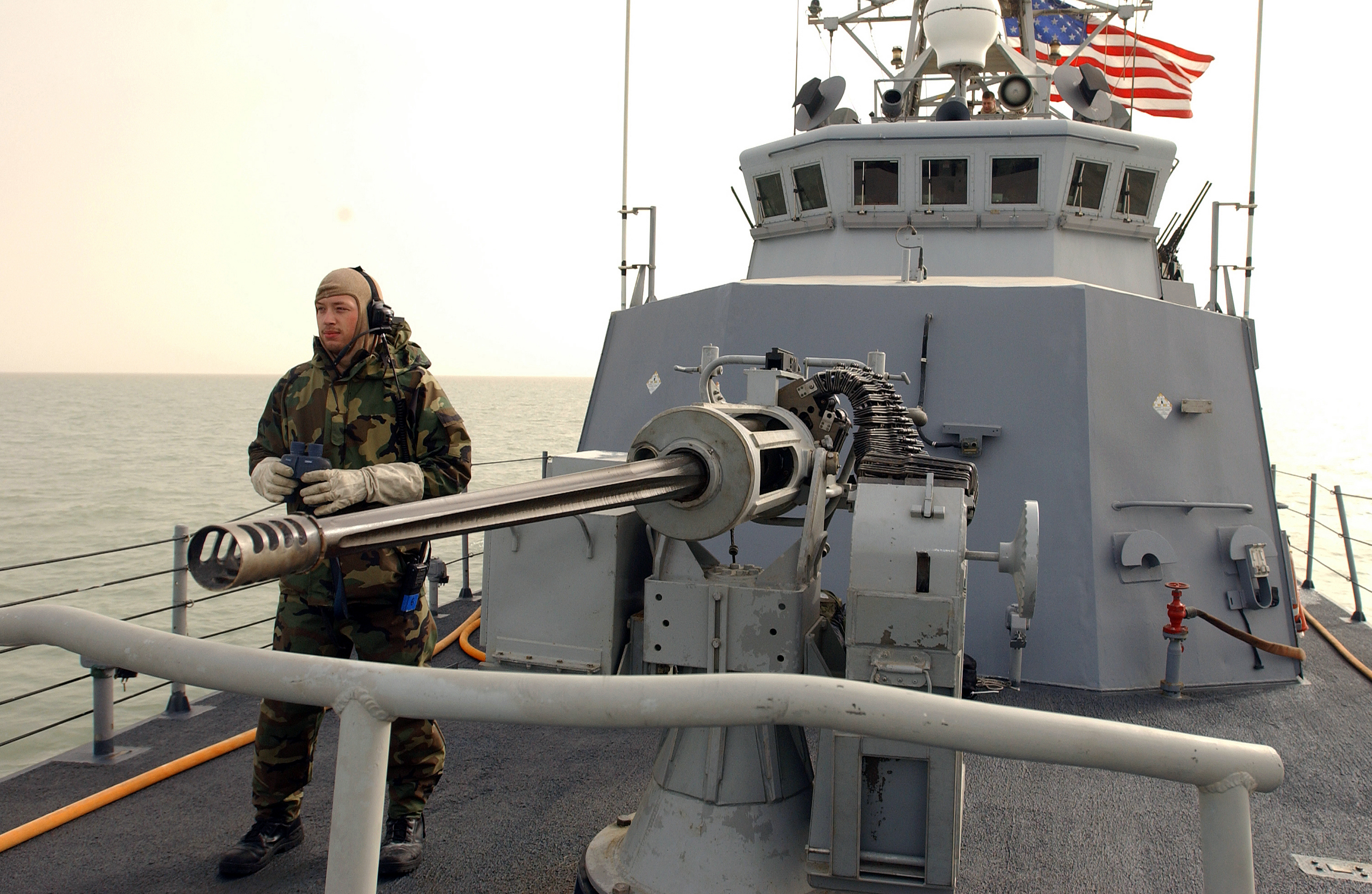
One of two crew-served Mk 38 25 mm autocannons carried aboard Chinook in 2003

The second USS Chinook (PC-9) was the ninth Cyclone-class patrol ship of the United States Navy. Contract awarded 19 July 1991 to Bollinger Shipyards, her keel was laid 16 June 1993, and she was launched 26 February 1994. She was delivered on 7 October 1994 and commissioned on 28 January 1995. She was decommissioned on 28 March 2023.

== Service history ==
On 10 January 2023, Chinook, along with sister patrol ship USS Monsoon (PC-4) and guided-missile destroyer USS The Sullivans (DDG-68), stopped and boarded a fishing vessel in the Gulf of Oman that was smuggling over 2000 AK-47 assault rifles.

Chinook together with sistership Monsoon were decommissioned from the US Navy on 28 March 2023, and were transferred to the Philippine Navy on the same day. Chinook was renamed BRP Ladislao Diwa.

== Awards ==
- Combat Action Ribbon (2003)
- Meritorious Unit Citation – 2 awards (2000, 2013 to 2015)
- Navy "E" Ribbon 3 awards (1998, 2003, 2015)
- National Defense Service Medal with star
- Iraq Campaign Medal with two campaign stars
- Global War on Terrorism Expeditionary Medal
- Global War on Terrorism Service Medal
