= USS Sirocco =

Navy Vessel

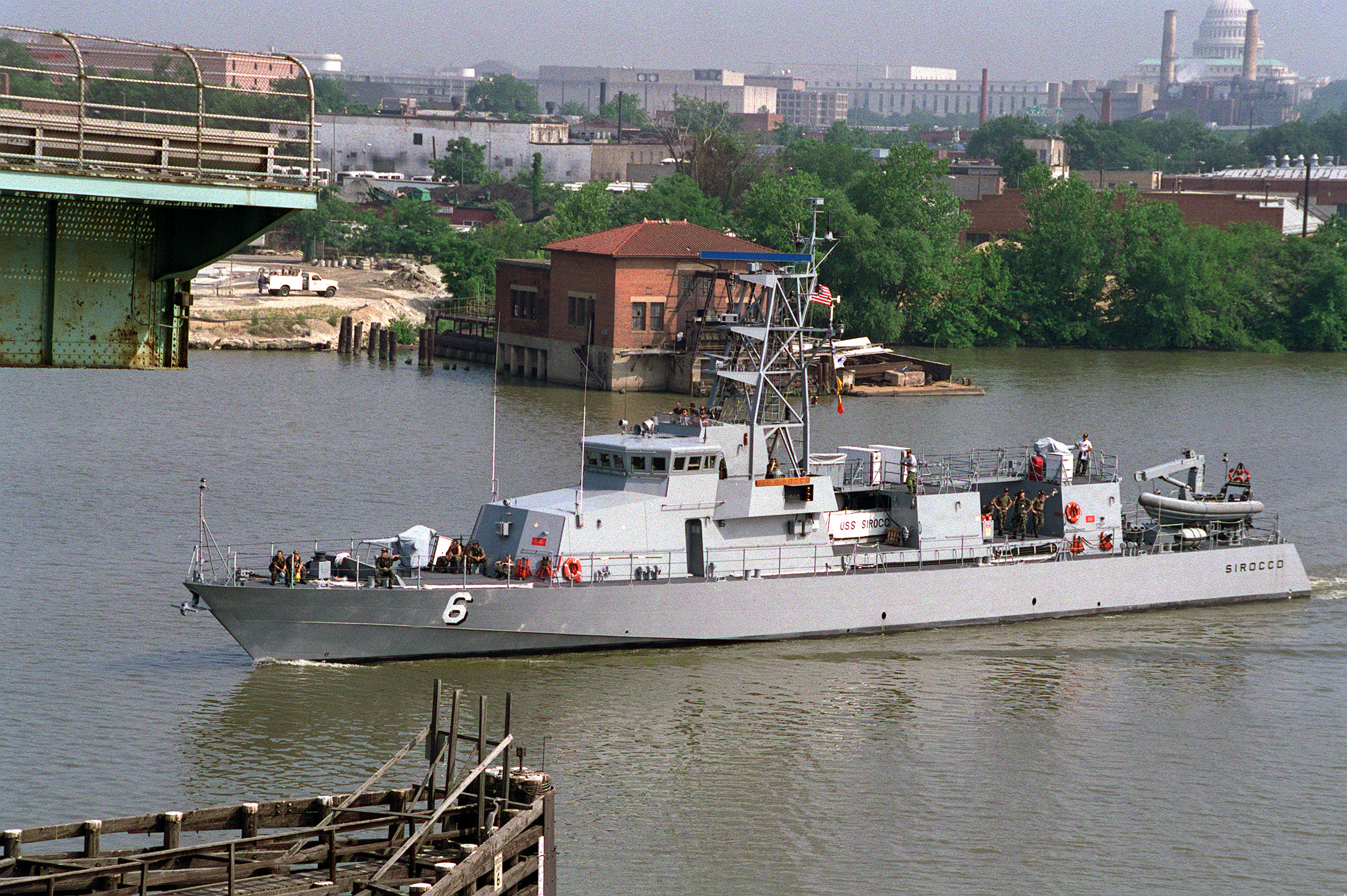
- USS Sirocco

History

United States
- Name: Sirocco
- Namesake: Sirocco
- Ordered: 3 August 1990
- Builder: Bollinger Shipyards, Lockport, Louisiana
- Laid down: 20 June 1992
- Launched: 29 May 1993
- Acquired: 11 March 1994
- Commissioned: 11 June 1994
- Decommissioned: 20 March 2023
- Home port: Manama, Bahrain
- Fate: Transferred to the Egyptian Navy
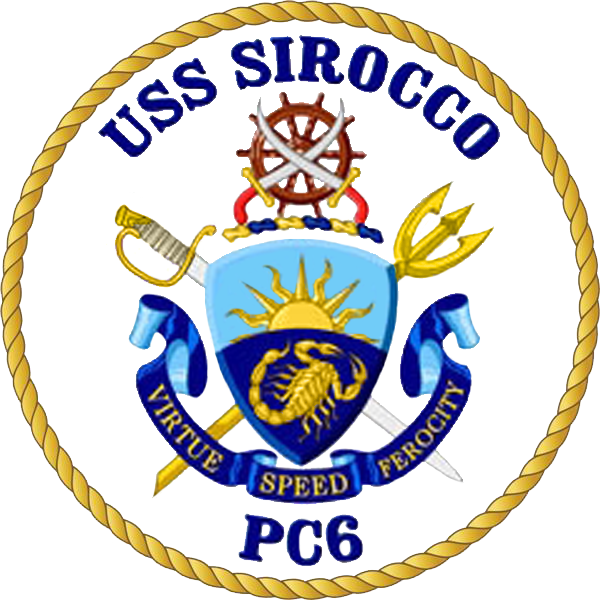
- Badge

Egypt
- Name: Amr Bin Elaas
- Namesake: Amr ibn al-As
- Acquired: 21 March 2023
- Home port: Alexandria, Egypt
- Identification: 721
- Status: Active

General characteristics
- Class & type: Cyclone-class patrol ship
- Displacement: 331 tons
- Length: 174 ft (53 m)
- Beam: 25 ft (7.6 m)
- Draught: 7.5 ft (2.3 m)
- Speed: 35 knots (65 km/h; 40 mph)
- Complement: 4 officers, 24 men, 8 Special Forces
- Armament: (USN) 2 Mk38 chain guns; 2 Mk19 grenade launchers; 2 .50 (12.7 mm) machine guns; 6 Stinger missiles

USS Sirocco (PC-6) was the sixth Cyclone-class patrol ship of the U.S. Navy. Sirocco was laid down 20 June 1992 by Bollinger Shipyards in Lockport, Louisiana. The ship was launched 29 May 1993, and sponsored by Mrs. Kathleen Smith, wife of RADM Raymond C. Smith, Commander, Naval Special Warfare Command. She was commissioned by the Navy 11 June 1994. As of 2004, the ship was stationed in Bahrain performing coastal patrol and interdiction surveillance in the region. She was decommissioned on 20 March 2023.

== History ==
Sirocco was assigned to Commander Fifth Fleet through Destroyer Squadron 50 and is homeported in Manama, Kingdom of Bahrain. Seven Patrol Coastal class (PC) warships were forward deployed to the Fifth Fleet. PC ships were formerly crewed by one of 13 rotational PC crews and homeported in Joint Expeditionary Base Little Creek, Virginia.

There, under the auspices of Commander, Patrol Coastal Squadron One/Commander, Patrol Coastal (PC) Class Squadron the crews trained on five U.S. based PC hulls prior to completing a six-month deployment to the Fifth fleet. PC ships such as Sirocco complete a variety of missions that has expanded since the transfer of the ships and associated support structures in naval surface warfare. As of 2009, PC ships deployed in Bahrain primarily conducted maritime security operations in the Persian Gulf with a concentration towards anti-piracy.

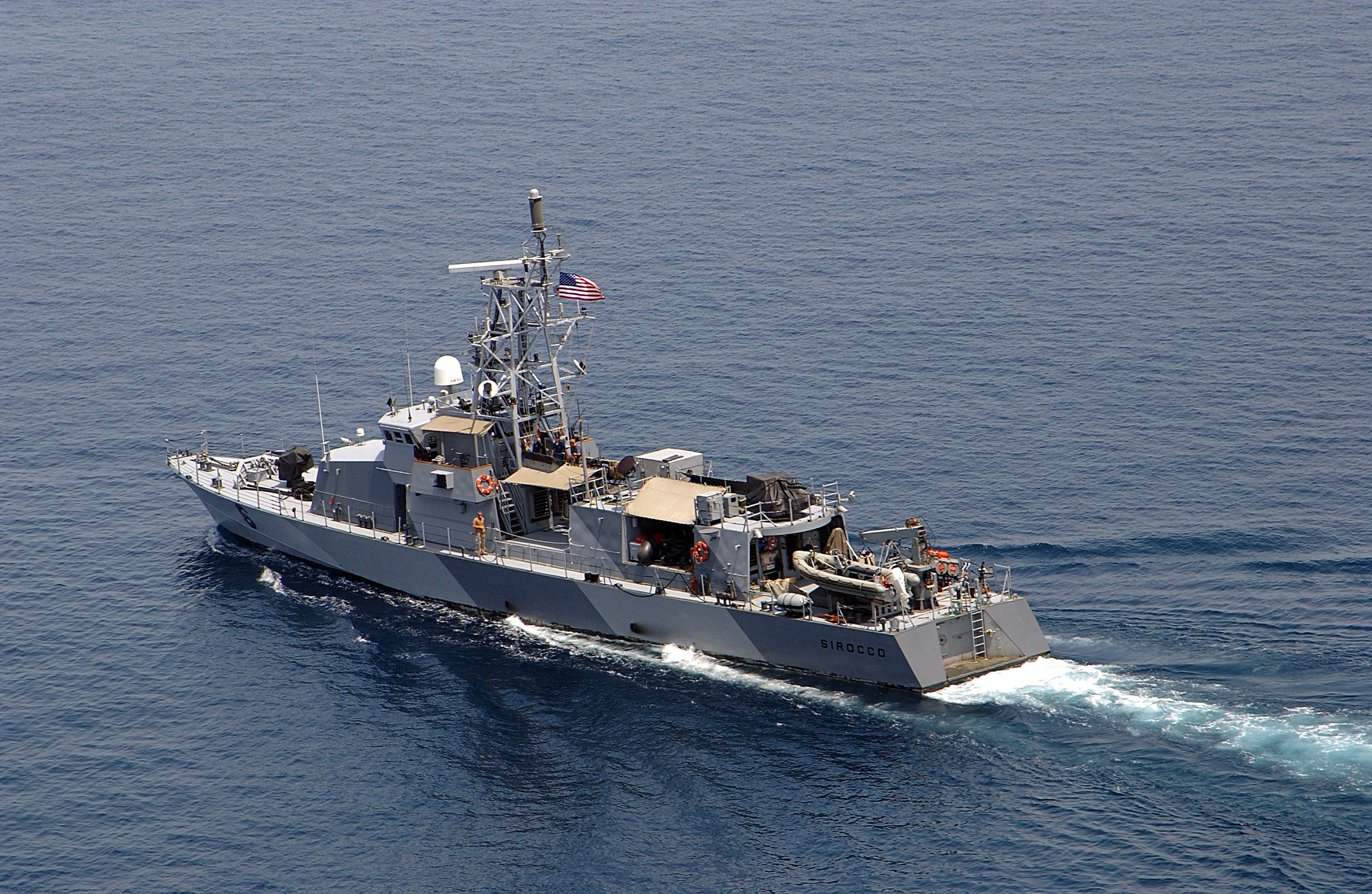
Sirocco in the Persian Gulf, April 2005

In 2009, Sirocco completed phase one of a modernization program to extend the useful lives of the ships. Upgrades included new computer systems and satellite communications, as well as upgraded air conditioning systems and a Rafael Typhoon MK38 MOD II gun weapons system replacing the previously fitted MK96 mount.

On 28 March 2016, Sirocco seized a stateless dhow in the Arabian sea. A boarding party had been dispatched to inspect the suspicious vessel and discovered it had been transporting 1,500 AK-47 assault rifles, 200 RPG launchers, and 21 .50 caliber machine guns. After receiving reports from Sirocco, the destroyer USS Gravely also arrived on the scene to assist. After the weapons were seized and offloaded, the dhow and its crew were released.

On 19 June 2022, Sirocco was involved in a confrontation with patrol craft of Iran's Islamic Revolutionary Guard Corps Navy in the Strait of Hormuz. The U.S. Navy claimed that the Iranian vessels approached Sirocco and the expeditionary fast transport USNS Choctaw County (T-EPF-2) at "unsafe and unprofessional" speeds and "aggressively" sailed to within 50 yards of the American vessels. Sirocco issued warnings over her loudspeaker system and fired a warning flare, and the Iranian vessels departed within an hour without further interactions.

Sirocco was decommissioned on 20 March 2023. The following day, she was commissioned by the Egyptian Navy as ENS Amir Bin Elaas (721).
