= USS Firebolt =

Cyclone-class coastal patrol boat

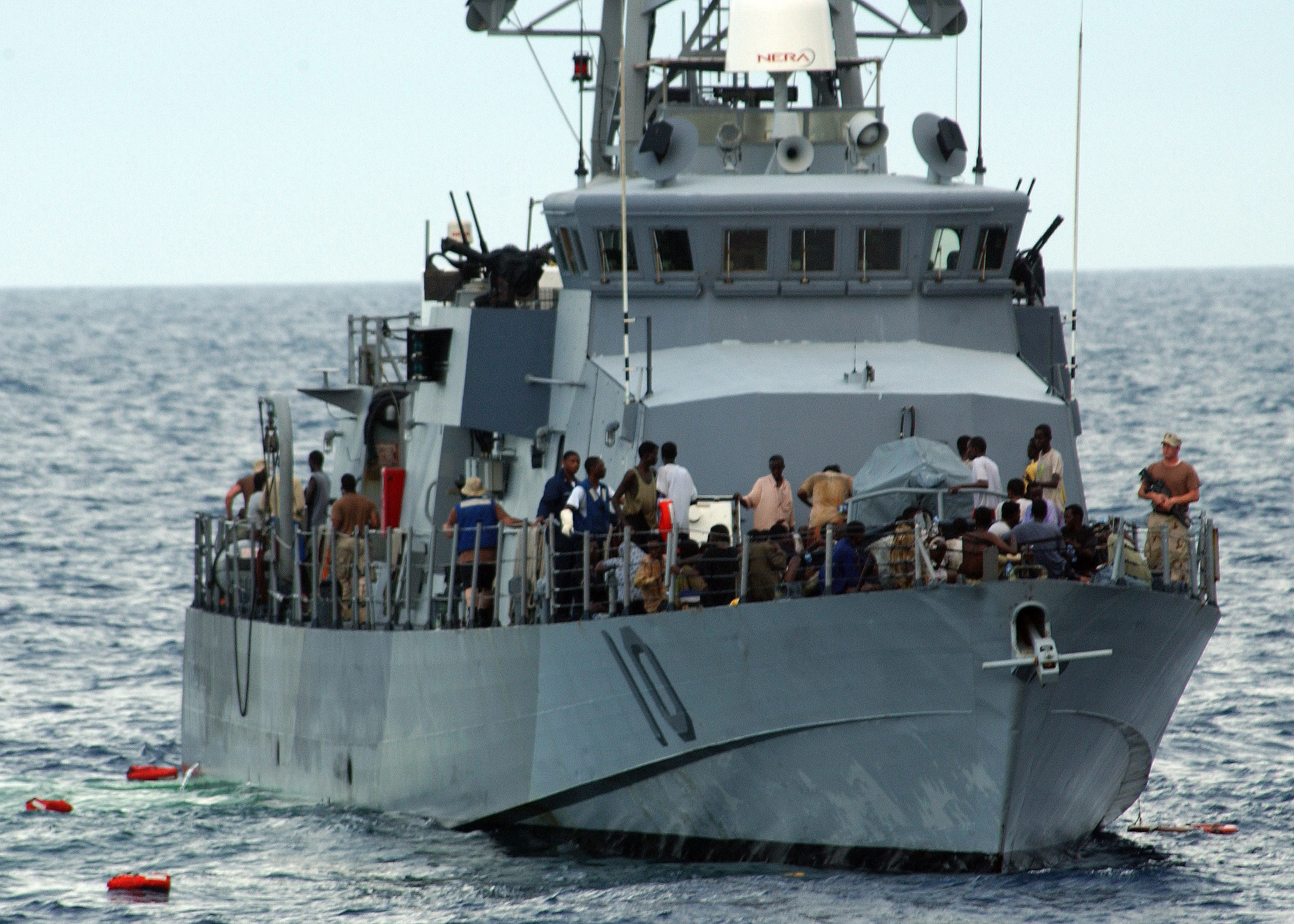
- USS Firebolt, laden with 89 survivors rescued from the Gulf of Aden after their small vessel capsized 29 April 2005.

History

United States
- Name: Firebolt
- Ordered: 19 July 1991
- Builder: Bollinger Shipyards
- Laid down: 17 September 1993
- Launched: 10 June 1994
- Commissioned: 10 June 1995
- Decommissioned: 23 February 2022
- Home port: Naval Amphibious Base Little Creek
- Motto: "Charge Hard Strike Fast"
- Status: Decommissioned
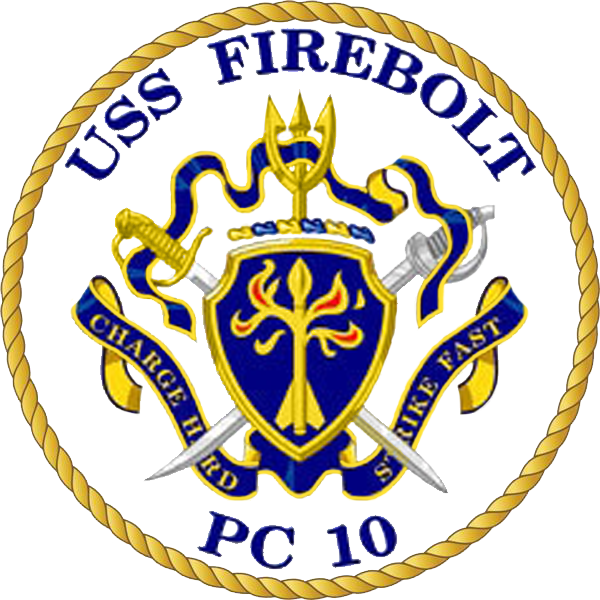
- Badge

Bahrain
- Name: RBNS Jenan; (جنان)
- Acquired: 30 March 2022
- Identification: Hull number (73)
- Status: In service

General characteristics
- Class & type: Cyclone-class patrol ship
- Displacement: 331 long tons (336 t)
- Length: 174 ft (53 m)
- Beam: 25 ft (7.6 m)
- Draft: 7 ft 6 in (2.3 m)
- Propulsion: 4 × Paxman diesel engines; 4 × propellers
- Speed: 35 knots (65 km/h; 40 mph)
- Complement: 5 officers; 23 enlisted
- Armament: 2 × Mk38 chain guns; 2 × Mk19 grenade launchers; 2 × .50 in (12.7 mm) machine guns; 6 × Stinger missiles

USS Firebolt (PC-10) was the 10th member of the Cyclone class of coastal patrol boats of the United States Navy. She was a 174 ft (53 m) vessel with a crew of approximately 30 sailors, normally homeported at Naval Amphibious Base Little Creek, Norfolk, Virginia. Her armament included two Mk38 chain guns, two Mk19 automatic grenade launchers, and two .50 in (12.7 mm) machine guns, as well as six Stinger missiles. She was laid down by Bollinger Shipyards on 17 September 1993, launched on 10 June 1994, commissioned into the Navy on 10 June 1995, and she was decommissioned on 23 February 2022.

== Persian Gulf service ==
In February 2003, Firebolt deployed to Bahrain to operate in the Persian Gulf in support of Operation Enduring Freedom and Operation Iraqi Freedom. While there, she rotated crews so that she could remain on station without returning home for leave. In February 2004, Firebolt collided with a navigational buoy off the coast of Iraq. The subsequent inquiry board into the incident led to the removal of Lieutenant Commander Michael T. Sullivan from command.

On 24 April 2004, Firebolt's rigid-hulled inflatable boat attempted a boarding operation on a dhow that was approaching the Khawr Al Amaya Oil Terminal in Iraq. As the boarding team of seven pulled alongside, the dhow exploded in an apparent suicide bombing. Two sailors and one coast guardsman were killed when the explosion flipped the boat over, dumping her crew into the water. The coast guardsman was a member of the embarked Law Enforcement Detachment and was the first coast guardsman to die in action since the Vietnam War. The survivors were picked up by an S-70B-2 Seahawk helicopter from the Australian frigate HMAS Stuart.

On 26 April 2021, Firebolt, in formation with USCGC Baranof, fired warning shots at several Iranian Islamic Revolutionary Guard Corps Navy (IRGCN) fast inshore attack craft (FIAC) after the smaller boats closed to within 68 yards despite warnings via radio and loud-hailer. The U.S. ships were performing routine maritime security patrols in the international waters of the North Persian Gulf.

== Decommissioning and Bahraini service ==
Firebolt was decommissioned on 14 March 2022 at Naval Support Activity Bahrain. On 30 March 2022, she was commissioned by the Bahraini Navy as RBNS Jenan.

== Photos ==
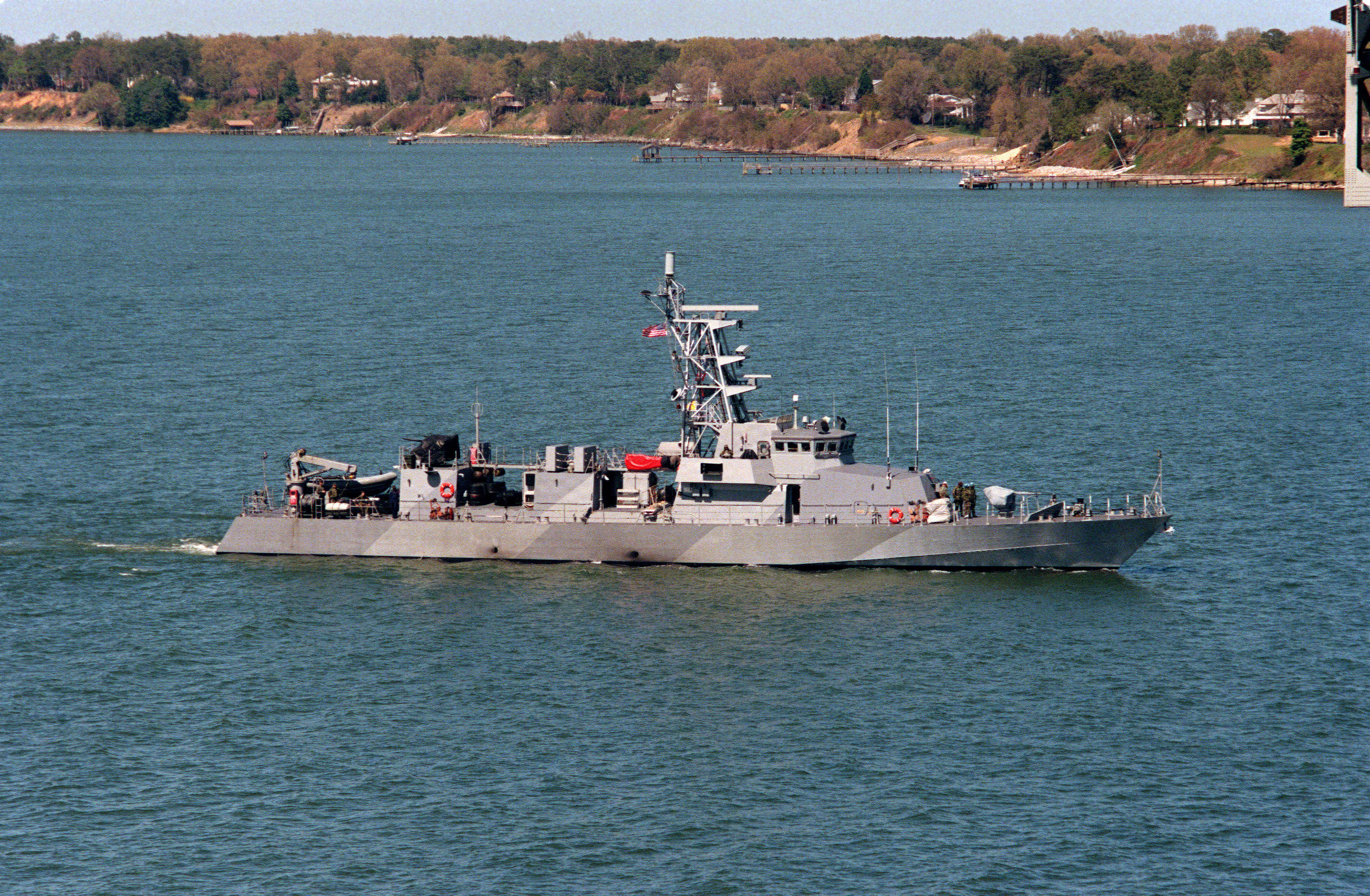
USS Firebolt at Yorktown Naval Weapons Station
