= Fleet Week =

Week in which US Armed Forces ships dock at major cities

The Blue Angels soar past the Golden Gate Bridge during Day 3 of the San Francisco Fleet Week Air Show on Sunday, October 11th, 2026.

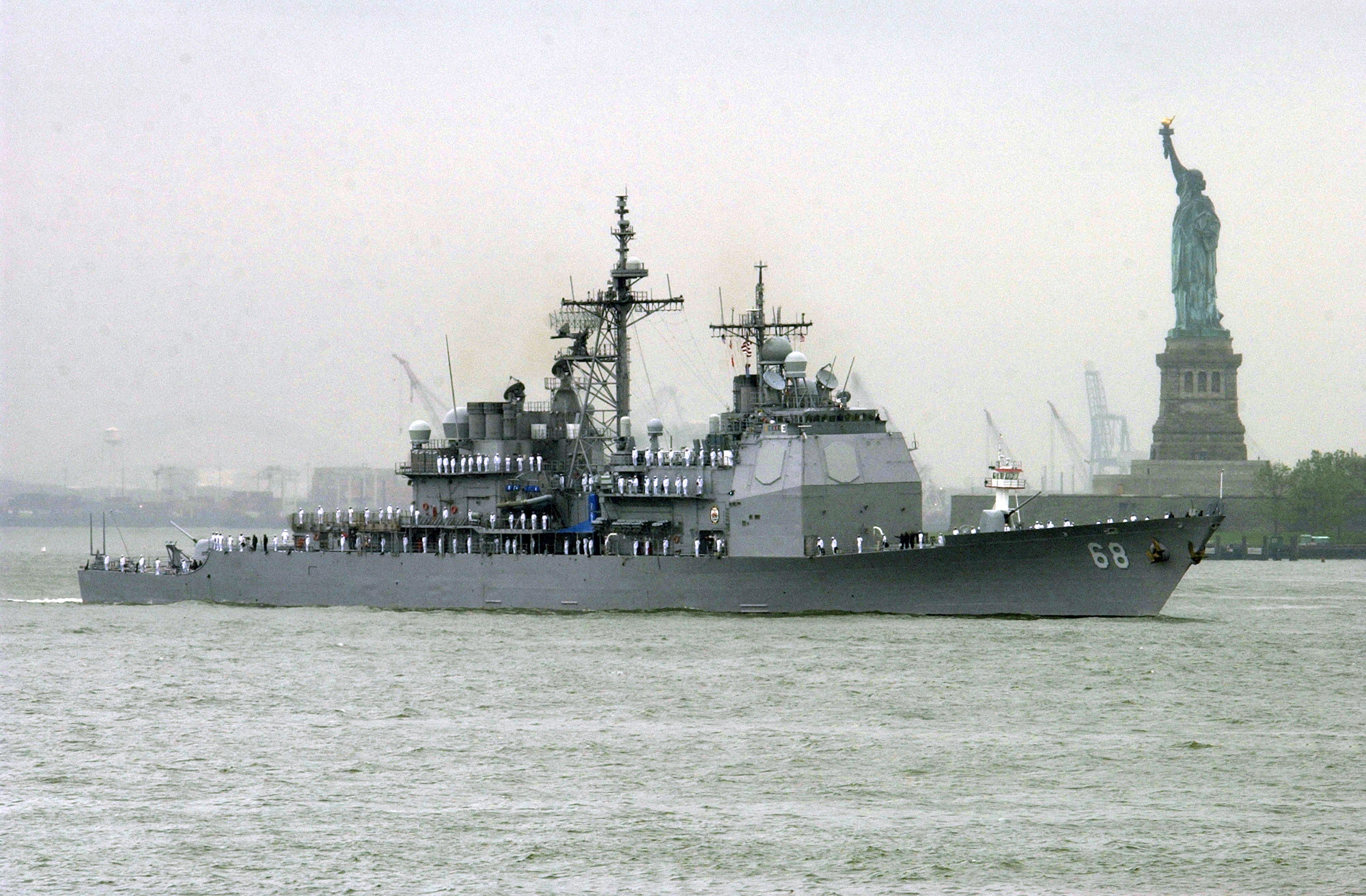
The guided missile cruiser USS Anzio sails past the Statue of Liberty at the beginning of Fleet Week 2004 in New York City.

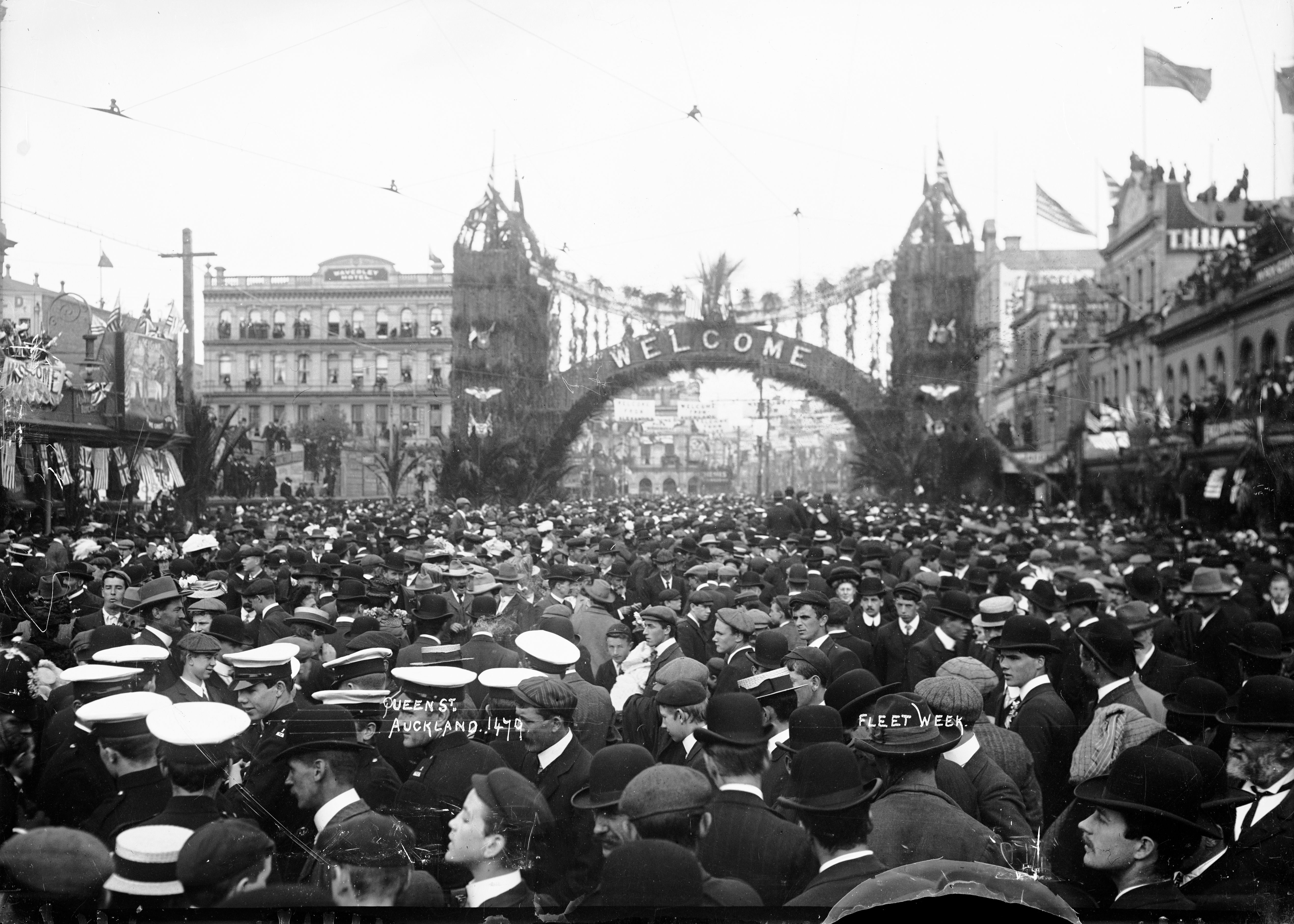
Fleet Week celebrations were sometimes also held overseas, as in 1908, when the Great White Fleet visited Auckland, New Zealand.

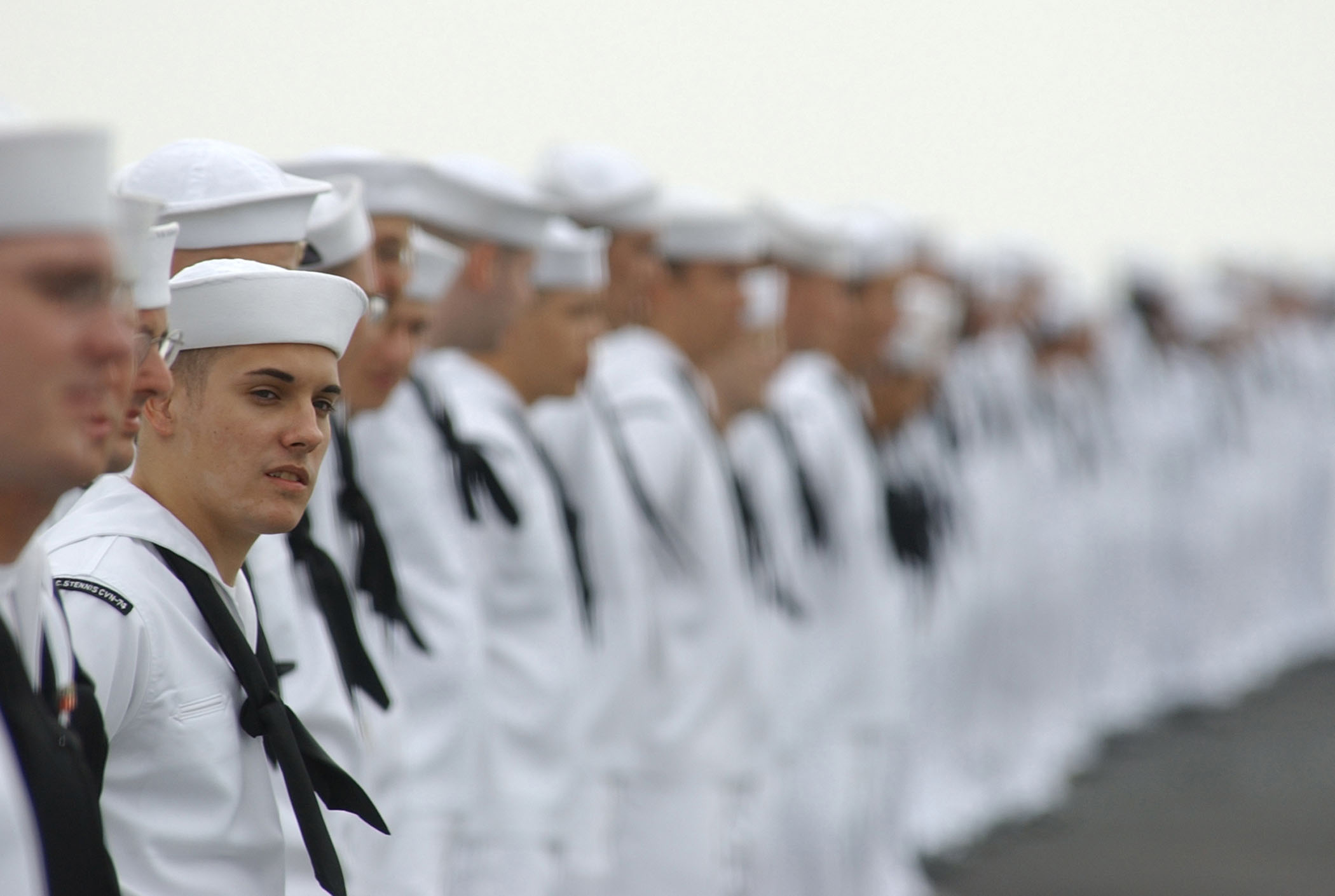
Sailors man the rails on the flight deck of USS John C. Stennis, San Diego Fleet Week parade.

Fleet Week is a United States Navy, United States Marine Corps, and United States Coast Guard tradition in which active military ships recently deployed in overseas operations dock in a variety of major cities for one week. Once the ships dock, the crews can enter the city and visit its tourist attractions. At certain hours, the public can take a guided tour of the ships. Often, Fleet Week is accompanied by military demonstrations and air shows such as those provided by the Blue Angels.

== History ==
The first Fleet Week was celebrated in San Diego, California, during the 1935 California Pacific International Exposition. The years between World War I and World War II saw an increasing military build-up in both Japan and Germany, while the communist Soviet Union (USSR) was given over to the wave of Stalinist nationalism. Most United States citizens experienced little sense of urgency about foreign developments because of isolationism and concerns with the ongoing economic Great Depression. However, then-U.S. president Franklin D. Roosevelt, a former assistant secretary of the Navy, was intent on expanding the U.S. Navy in response to world political trends. A major aircraft company was moving to Lindbergh Field, (today more commonly known as San Diego International Airport). In this atmosphere, Fleet Week was born.

At 11 a.m. on May 29, 1935, a color guard of the U.S. Marine Corps led a parade across Cabrillo Bridge to Plaza del Pacifico, where the U.S. flag was raised to open the Exposition officially. At 8 p.m., Roosevelt spoke by telephone and designated two selected orphans to press the buttons turning on the lights which bathed the grounds in color. In his remarks, heard over the loudspeaker system, Roosevelt said: "The decision of the people of San Diego thus to dedicate the California Pacific International Exposition is, I believe, worthy of the courage and confidence with which our people now look to the future. No one can deny that we have passed through troubled years. No one can fail to feel the inspiration of your high purpose. I wish you great success."

During Fleet Week in June 1935, 114 warships and 400 military planes arrived under command of U.S. Navy Admiral Joseph M. Reeves, Commander-in-Chief of the U.S. Fleet. It was described as the mightiest fleet ever assembled under the U.S. flag. It included forty-eight battleships, cruisers and aircraft carriers, with more than 3,000 commissioned officers and 55,000 enlisted men. The U.S. Navy men visited the Exposition and, in turn, thousands of San Diegans and other fairgoers were guests on the various ships.

== San Francisco ==
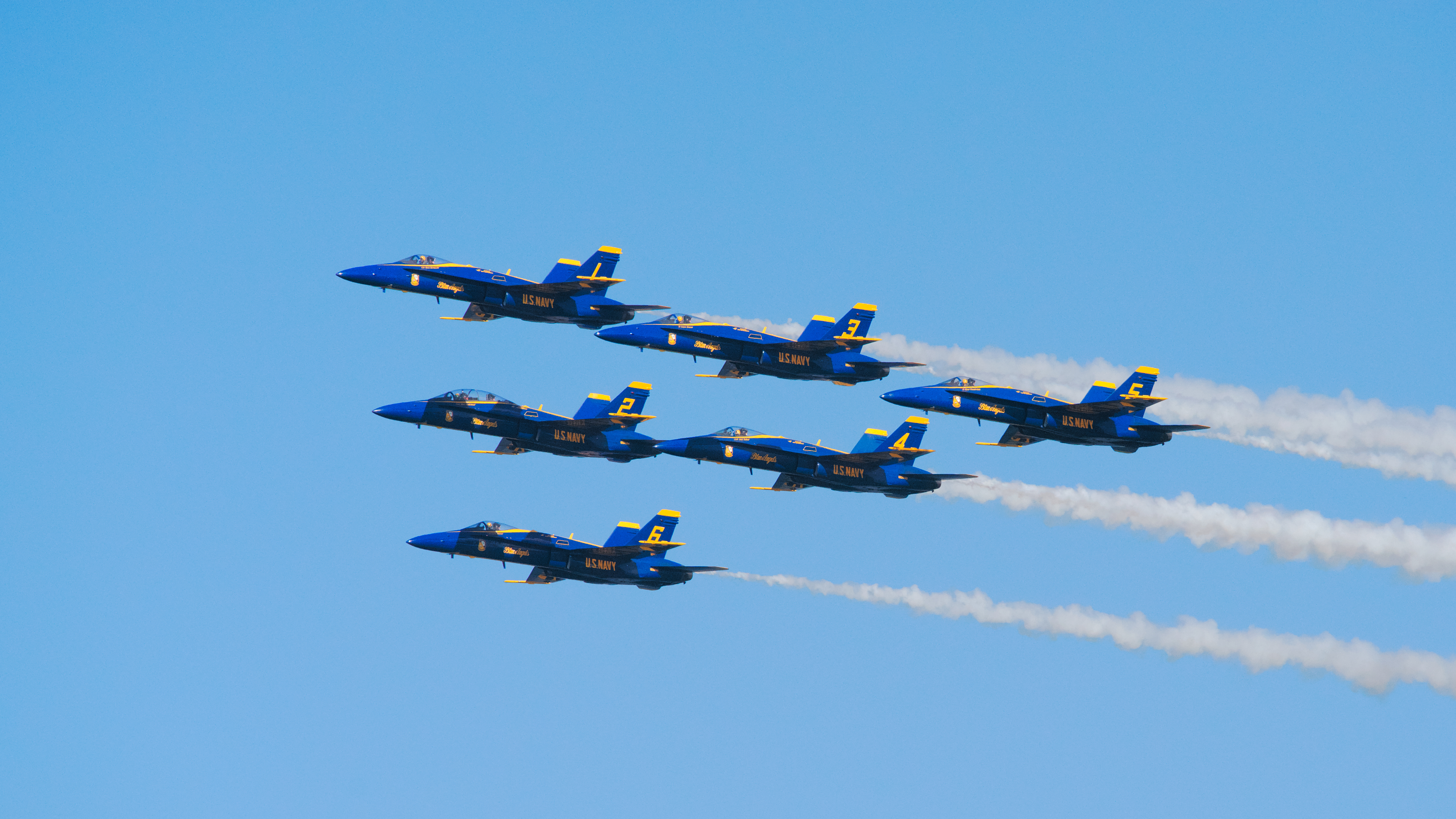
Blue Angels performing at Fleet Week San Francisco in 2016

For years it was common for several U.S. Navy ships to dock in San Francisco, California for a similar series of events. One or more fleet ships were docked as a "visit ship" for tourists to board, and the local community took in sailors for home visits; drinks were often discounted to uniformed sailors at area bars and restaurants. The highlight of the San Francisco Fleet Week is the Air Show on San Francisco Bay with the Blue Angels as the center of attention. The Air Show also features stunt planes and parachute team and Coast Guard demonstrations. Another highlight of the Fleet Week SF is a parade of ships under the Golden Gate Bridge.

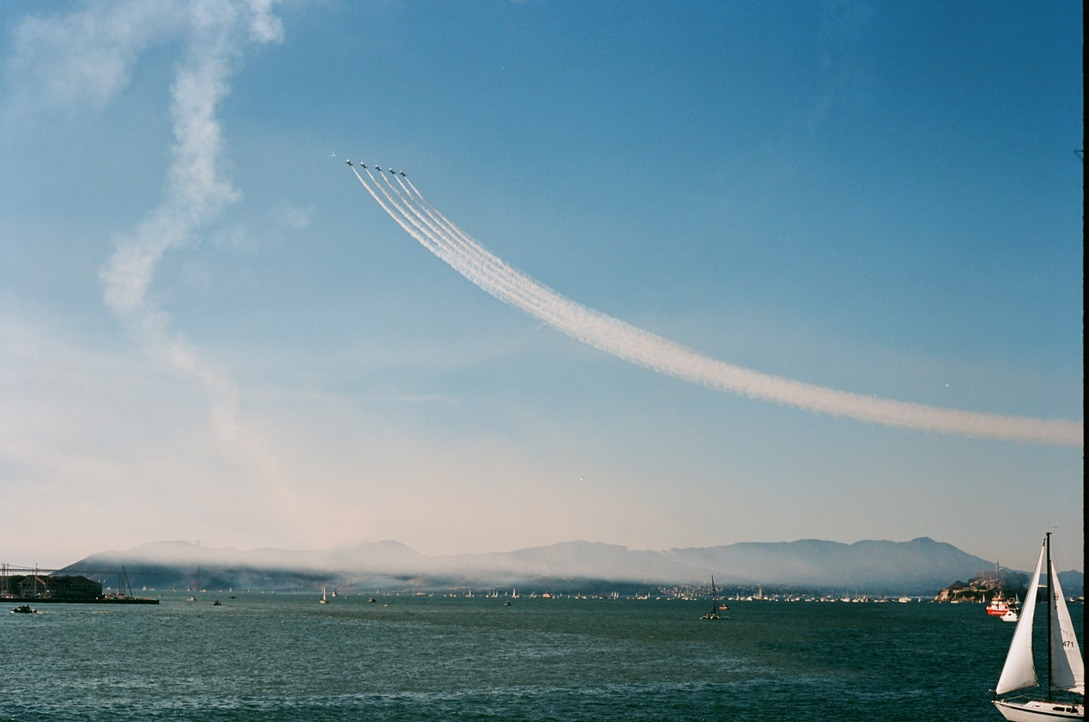
Blue Angels flying over San Francisco Bay. Golden Gate Bridge bottom left, Alcatraz Island bottom right.

The revived name of Fleet Week was applied to an expanded and more heavily publicized fleet visit in 1981, in conjunction with Columbus Day Weekend celebrations during the second week of October. Since then, the event has been held each year during the Columbus Day Weekend without a break and celebrated its 25th anniversary in 2005. The event is estimated to attract over one million people who watch the air show along the San Francisco Bay waterfront stretching from the Ferry Building to the Golden Gate Bridge. The event was canceled for 2013 due to federal budgetary issues, but was revived in 2014, and continues to be an annual event.

=== San Francisco Fleet Week 2018 ===
Ships included:

- USS Bonhomme Richard (LHD-6)
- USS Dewey (DDG-105)
- USS Manchester (LCS-14)
- USCGC Forrest Rednour (WPC-1129)
- HMCS Vancouver (FFH 331)
- MV Cape Horn
- MV John D. Dillard

=== San Francisco Fleet Week 2019 ===
Ships included:

- USS Somerset (LPD-25)
- USS Princeton (CG-59)
- USS Zumwalt (DDG-1000)
- USS Charleston (LCS-18)
- USCGC Steadfast (WMEC-623)
- USCGC Terrell Horne (WPC-1131)
- HMAS Brisbane (DDG 41)

=== San Francisco Fleet Week 2021 ===
San Francisco Fleet Week returned after 2020 was cancelled due to the COVID-19 pandemic.

Ships included:

- USS Rushmore (LSD-47)
- USS Michael Monsoor (DDG-1001)
- USS John S. McCain (DDG-56)
- USS Shoup (DDG-86)
- USCGC Robert Ward (WPC-1130)

=== San Francisco Fleet Week 2022 ===
Ships included:

- USS Harpers Ferry (LSD-49)
- USS Princeton (CG-59)
- USS Fitzgerald (DDG-62)
- USS Kansas City (LCS-22)
- USCGC Terrell Horne (WPC-1131)

=== San Francisco Fleet Week 2023 ===
Ships included:

- USS John P. Murtha (LPD-26)
- USS Paul Hamilton (DDG-60)
- USCGC Waesche (WMSL-751)
- USCGC Benjamin Bottoms (WPC-1132)

=== San Francisco Fleet Week 2024 ===
Ships included:

- USS Tripoli (LHA-7)
- USS Somerset (LPD-25)
- USCGC Bertholf (WMSL-750)
- HMCS Regina (FFH 334)

=== San Francisco Fleet Week 2025 ===
The U.S. Navy did not participate due to the government shutdown.

== Port Everglades ==
For more than 20 years, Fleet Week Port Everglades has been produced as a signature event for South Florida each spring by Broward Navy Days, a non-profit 501(c)(3). FW PEV provides an annual opportunity for residents to honor and celebrate Sailors, Marines and Coast Guardsmen for their service to their country as well as witness first-hand the latest capabilities of today's modern navy. With the support of sponsors and assistance of hundreds of volunteers representing veterans, civic and service organizations, FW PEV offers opportunities to enjoy shore leave and participate in a wide variety of recreational, vocational and community service activities. Popular events include:

All Hands on Deck Welcoming Party, Damage Control Olympics, Community Relations Projects, Ship Tours, Celebrity Chef Luncheon, Ship Honorary Dinners, Submariners Reception, Take a Hero Fishing Tournament, Golf Tournament, Culinary Competitions, Sailor of the Year Recognition and Dignitary Reception.

The Air & Sea Show was an annual air show in Ft. Lauderdale, Florida in which military and civilian performances took place on the four mile stretch of beach from Oakland Park to Las Olas Boulevard. The show existed from 1995 until 2007. It was revived in 2017 and now takes place around Memorial Day exclusive of Fleet Week.

=== Port Everglades Fleet Week 2018 ===
Visiting ships included:

- USS Kearsarge (LHD-3)
- USS Detroit (LCS-7)
- USCGC Confidence (WMEC-619)
- USCGC Robert Yered (WPC-1104)
- USCGC Willow (WLB-202)

=== Port Everglades Fleet Week 2019 ===
Visiting ships included:

- USS New York (LPD-21)
- USS Hue City (CG-66)
- USS Farragut (DDG-99)
- USS Albany (SSN-753)
- USCGC Spencer (WMEC-905)
- USCGC William Flores (WPC-1103)

=== Port Everglades Fleet Week 2020 ===
On March 16, 2020, Fleet Week was cancelled due to the COVID-19 pandemic.

=== Port Everglades Fleet Week 2021 ===
Fleet Week was cancelled due to the COVID-19 pandemic.

=== Port Everglades Fleet Week 2022 ===
On April 21, 2022, the Navy announced visiting ships would be:

- USS Lassen (DDG-82)
- USS Delbert D. Black (DDG-119)
- USCGC William Flores (WPC-1103)
- USCGC Ibis (WPB-87338)

=== Port Everglades Fleet Week 2023 ===
On April 21, 2023, the Navy announced visiting ships would be:

- USS New York (LPD-21)
- USS Cole (DDG-67)
- USS Indiana (SSN-789)
- USNS Newport (T-EPF-12)

=== Port Everglades Fleet Week 2025 ===
Visiting ships were:

- USS New York (LPD-21)
- USS Cole (DDG-67)
- USS New Hampshire (SSN-778)
- USCGC Tampa (WMEC-902)

== New York City ==
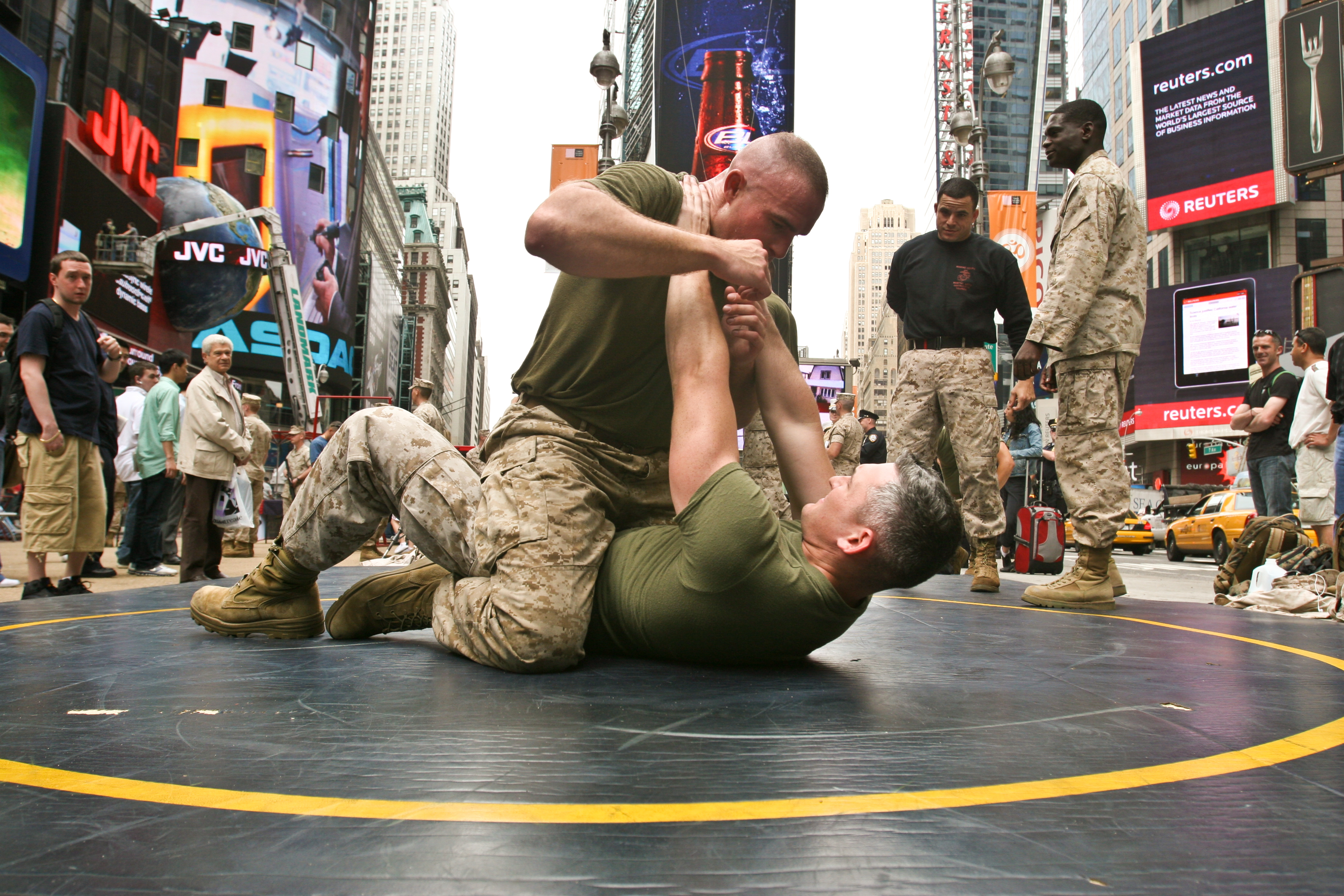
Marines demonstrate Marine Corps Martial Arts Program techniques at Times Square in 2010.

US Naval vessels had visited New York City in a celebratory manner dating back to the aftermath of the Spanish–American War in 1898, when Commodore George Dewey was celebrated as the hero of the battle of Manila Bay. However, the first official Fleet Week began in New York City in 1982. Fleet Week in New York City is generally timed to coincide with the Memorial Day holiday weekend.

During the New York City Fleet Week, ships are docked at New York Passenger Ship Terminal on the Hudson River on the West Side of the borough of Manhattan and also at Stapleton in the borough of Staten Island. In 2012, ships visited Brooklyn for the first time, docking at the Cruise Ship Terminal.

The practice of US Navy ships visiting the city and being open for tours began in 1988. NYC Fleet Week 1988 included the aircraft carrier USS America and battleship USS Iowa. Other vessels included the guided missile cruiser USS Josephus Daniels and the guided missile destroyers USS Kidd and USS Preble

NYC Fleet Week 1989 celebrated the bicentennial of the inauguration of President George Washington. Visiting vessels included the aircraft carrier USS Forrestal and the AEGIS cruiser USS Ticonderoga.

NYC Fleet Week 1990 included the aircraft carrier USS John F. Kennedy. Fifteen Navy and Coast Guard ships were part of the celebration which included commemoration of the bicentennial of the US Coast Guard. third annual Fleet Week. Vessels included the Coast Guard training ship Eagle,

NYC Fleet Week 1991 coincided with Operation Welcome Home to commemorate military personnel returning from Operations Desert Shield and Desert Storm. Vessels included the aircraft carrier USS America, battleship USS Wisconsin, and the AEGIS cruiser USS San Jacinto.

NYC Fleet Week 1992 was held from May 20–26. It included 13 US naval ships and 7 vessels from European navies.

NYC Fleet Week 1993 was held from May 27–31, and included ships from several countries including the Russian destroyer Bezuderzhny and oiler Sheksna. The US presence of 12 ships was headlined by the aircraft carrier USS John F. Kennedy. Ships at the Manhattan location included USS John F. Kennedy, USS Leyte Gulf. US Navy ships in Staten Island included USS Clifton Sprague and USS Bowen, USS Normandy, USS Wainwright, and USS Donald B. Beary. Ainsworth, rescue ship Ortolan, USS Capodanno The US Coast Guard was represented by vessels Adak, Sorrel, Staten Island, Tampa, and Wire. A Polish submarine also visited.

NYC Fleet Week 1998 was May 20–27 and included the aircraft carrier USS John F. Kennedy. NYC Fleet Week 1999 included the amphibious assault ship USS Wasp. NYC Fleet Week 2002 began on May 22, and was the first Fleet Week following the September 11, 2001 terrorist attacks that destroyed the World Trade Center. Thirteen U.S. Navy ships, five U.S. Coast Guard ships, one ship representing the Canadian Navy and one representing the Danish Navy sailed up the Hudson River to piers 86 and 88 near the Intrepid Sea-Air-Space Museum and to Staten Island. US ships included USS Sentry.

NYC Fleet Week 2003 included eighteen ships from five nations, including tall sailing ships from Mexico and India. Nine ships of the US Navy were present, including USS Shreveport, an Austin-class amphibious transport dock, the dock landing ship USS Portland, three guided missile cruisers including USS Normandy, and three frigates.

=== New York City Fleet Week 2004 ===
Ships included:

- USS Anzio
- USS Barry.

=== New York City Fleet Week 2005 ===
Visiting ships included:

- USS John F. Kennedy
- USS Shreveport
- USS Cape St. George
- USS Porter
- USS Carr
- USCGC Vigorous
- USCGC Katherine Walker
- PNS Tippu Sultan
- PNS Moawin

=== New York City Fleet Week 2007 ===
Ships included:

- USS Hue City
- USS San Jacinto
- USS Oscar Austin
- USS Winston S. Churchill
- USS Stephen W. Groves

=== New York City Fleet Week 2008 ===
The 2008 Fleet Week, the 21st annual observance, began May 21. Visiting ships were:

- USS Kearsarge
- USS Leyte Gulf
- USS Monterey
- USS Nitze
- USS The Sullivans
- USCGC Ida Lewis
- HMCS Toronto
- HMCS St. John's
- HMCS Preserver

=== New York City Fleet Week 2009 ===
New York City Fleet Week 2009 was May 20–26, 2009, with representatives from both the U.S. military and the Royal Canadian Navy. The visiting ships were:

- USS Iwo Jima
- USS Vella Gulf
- USS Roosevelt
- USS Thunderbolt
- USS Tempest
- USS Hurricane
- USCGC Spencer
- USCGC Katherine Walker
- HMCS Athabaskan
- HMCS Fredericton
- HMCS Montréal
- HMCS St. John's
- HMCS Preserver

=== New York City Fleet Week 2010 ===
The 23rd Fleet Week ran May 26–31, 2010. Visiting ships included:

- USS Iwo Jima
- USS Philippine Sea
- USS James E. Williams
- USS De Wert
- USS Tempest
- USS Monsoon
- USS Squall
- USCGC Campbell
- USCGC Abbie Burgess
- USCGC Katherine Walker
- USAV General Frank S. Besson Jr.
- HMCS Athabaskan

=== New York City Fleet Week 2011 ===
The 24th New York Fleet Week was in May 2011. Visiting ships were:

- USS Iwo Jima
- USS New York
- USS John L. Hall
- USS Kauffman
- USS Carr
- USCGC Willow
- USCGC Tampa
- USCGC Reliance

=== New York City Fleet Week 2012 ===
The 25th New York City Fleet Week was in May 2012. It was also OpSail 2012 in commemoration of the War of 1812. Visiting ships were:

- USS Wasp
- USS San Jacinto
- USS Roosevelt
- USS Gonzalez
- USS Donald Cook
- USS Mitscher
- USCGC Eagle
- USCGC Willow
- USCGC Seneca
- Brazilian tall ship Cisne Branco
- French schooner Belle Poule
- French schooner Étoile
- ARM Cuauhtémoc
- ARC Gloria
- KRI Dewaruci
- Juan Sebastián Elcano
- BAE Guayas
- HMCS Iroquois
- RFA Argus
- JDS Shirane
- Finnish minelayer Pohjanmaa

=== New York City Fleet Week 2013 ===
Fleet Week was canceled due to federal budget cuts (sequestration).

=== New York City Fleet Week 2014 ===
On April 8, 2014, the Navy announced that visiting ships would be:

- USS Oak Hill
- USS Cole
- USS McFaul – USS Gettysburg was the originally scheduled to attend, but was replaced by McFaul
- USCGC Katherine Walker
- USCGC Campbell

=== New York City Fleet Week 2015 ===
On April 13, 2015, the Navy announced that visiting ships would be:

- USS San Antonio
- USS Barry
- USS Stout
- USCGC Spencer
- USCGC Sturgeon Bay
- USNAS YP-705
- USNAS YP-706
- USNAS YP-707
- USNAS YP-708

=== New York City Fleet Week 2016 ===
On April 4, 2016, the Navy announced visiting ships would be:

- USS Bataan
- USS Fort McHenry
- USS Bainbridge
- USS Farragut
- USS Shamal
- USCGC Forward
- USCGC Katherine Walker – USCGC Juniper was originally scheduled to attend, but was replaced by Katherine Walker
- HMCS Athabaskan
- HMCS Kingston
- HMCS Moncton
- USNAS YP-705
- USNAS YP-706
- USNAS YP-707
- USNAS YP-708

=== New York City Fleet Week 2017 ===
On May 8, 2017, the Navy announced visiting ships would be:

- USS Kearsarge
- USS San Jacinto
- USS Monterey
- USS Lassen
- USS Zephyr
- USCGC Hamilton
- USCGC Katherine Walker
- USNS Yuma
- HMCS Glace Bay
- USNAS YP-705
- USNAS YP-706
- USNAS YP-707
- USNAS YP-708
- RV Neil Armstrong

=== New York City Fleet Week 2018 ===
On April 12, 2018, the Navy announced visiting ships would be:

- USS Arlington
- USS Mitscher
- USS Little Rock
- USS Zephyr
- USCGC Diligence
- USCGC Richard Snyder
- USCGC Sturgeon Bay – USCGC Katherine Walker was originally scheduled to attend but was replaced by Sturgeon Bay
- USNS Maury
- USNS City of Bismarck
- HMCS Moncton
- USNAS YP-705
- USNAS YP-706
- USNAS YP-707
- USNAS YP-708

=== New York City Fleet Week 2019 ===
On March 27, 2019, the Navy announced visiting ships would be:

- USS New York
- USS Hue City
- USS Jason Dunham
- USS Milwaukee
- USS Tornado
- USCGC Campbell
- USCGC Lawrence O. Lawson
- USCGC Katherine Walker
- USNS Burlington
- HMCS Glace Bay
- HMCS Oriole
- USNAS YP-705
- USNAS YP-706
- USNAS YP-707
- USNAS YP-708

=== New York City Fleet Week 2020 ===
On March 27, 2020, it was announced that the in-person Fleet Week event had been cancelled due to the COVID-19 pandemic. "Virtual Fleet Week," its web-based alternative, attracted over 170,000 unique viewers from May 20–26, 2020.

=== New York City Fleet Week 2021 ===
On February 8, 2021, it was announced that the in-person Fleet Week event had again been cancelled due to the COVID-19 pandemic. Virtual Fleet Week returned for its second consecutive year.

=== New York City Fleet Week 2022 ===
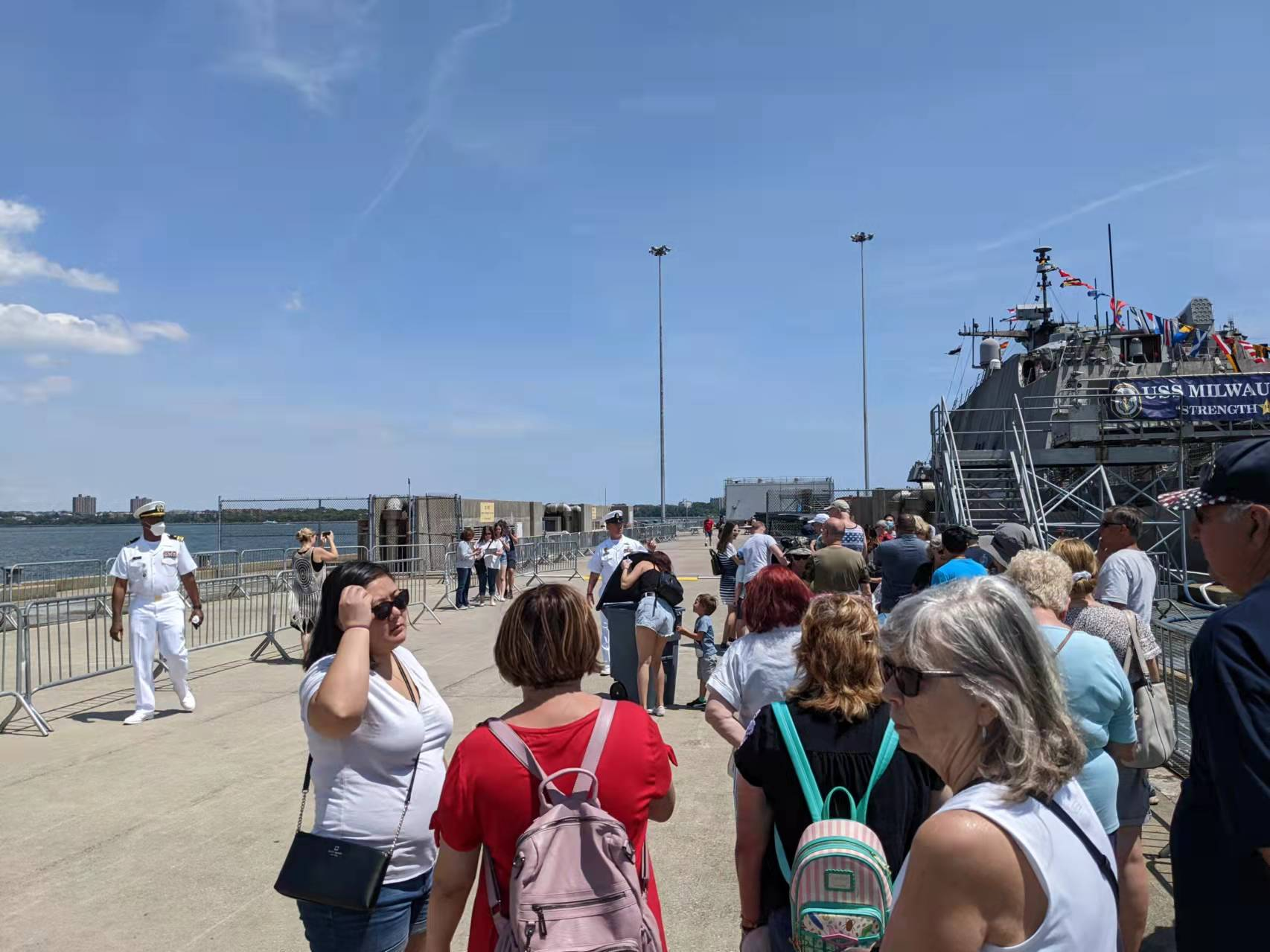
2022 NYC Fleet Week ship tours at Staten Island's Homeport Pier.

On March 16, 2022, it was announced that Fleet Week would return after a two-year pause due to COVID-19. On April 1, 2022, it was announced visiting ships would be:

- USS Bataan (LHD-5)
- USS Milwaukee (LCS-5)
- USCGC Dependable (WMEC-626)
- USCGC Sycamore (WLB-209)
- HMS Protector (A173)
- USNAS YP-705
- USNAS YP-706
- USNAS YP-707
- USNAS YP-708

=== New York City Fleet Week 2023 ===
On April 4, 2023, it was announced visiting ships would be:

- USS Bataan (LHD-5)
- USS Oak Hill (LSD-51)
- USS Cole (DDG-67)
- USCGC Legare (WMEC-912)
- USCGC Warren Deyampert (WPC-1151)
- USNS Newport (T-EPF-12)
- HMS Scott (H131)
- HMCS Glace Bay (MM 701)
- Virginio Fasan (F591)
- USNAS YP-705
- USNAS YP-706
- USNAS YP-707
- USNAS YP-708

=== New York City Fleet Week 2024 ===
On 24 April, it was announced visiting ships would be:

- USS Bataan (LHD-5)
- USS Marinette (LCS-25)
- USCGC Calhoun (WMSL-759)
- USCGC Sturgeon Bay (WTGB-109)
- USCGC Katherine Walker (WLM-552)
- Baden-Württemberg (F222)
- Frankfurt am Main (A1412)
- USNAS YP-705
- USNAS YP-706
- USNAS YP-707
- USNAS YP-708

=== New York City Fleet Week 2025 ===
On 24 April, it was announced visiting ships would be:

- USS New York (LPD-21)
- USS Oak Hill (LSD-51)
- USCGC Calhoun (WMSL-759)
- USCGC Sturgeon Bay (WTGB-109)
- USCGC Hawser (WYTL-65610)
- HMCS Frédérick Rolette (AOPV-434)
- USNAS YP-705
- USNAS YP-706
- USNAS YP-707
- USNAS YP-708

== Baltimore ==
Maryland Fleet Week is a biennial tradition in Baltimore and is managed by Historic Ships in Baltimore.

=== Maryland Fleet Week and Air Show Baltimore Fleet Week 2018 ===
Ships included:

- USS Oak Hill (LSD-51)
- USS Milwaukee (LCS-5)
- USS Tornado (PC-14)
- USNS City of Bismarck (T-EPF-9)
- USCGC Eagle (WIX-327)
- HMS Monmouth (F235)
- HMCS Moncton (MM 708)
- USACE Catlett
- USACE Reynolds
- RV Bay Hydro II (NOAA)
- SV Godspeed
- USNAS YP-705
- USNAS YP-706
- USNAS YP-707
- USNAS YP-708

=== Maryland Fleet Week and Air Show Baltimore Fleet Week 2022 ===
- Ships included:
- USS Carter Hall (LSD-50)
- USS Minneapolis-Saint Paul (LCS-21)
- USCGC James Rankin (WLM-555)
- USNS Newport (T-EPF-12)
- HMCS Moncton (MM 708)
- HMCS Glace Bay (MM 701)
- HMS Richmond (F239)
- Danmark
- USNAV YP-705
- USNAV YP-706

=== Maryland Fleet Week and Air Show Baltimore Fleet Week 2024 ===
Ships included:

- USS Marinette (LCS 25)
- USS Gonzalez (DDG 66)
- USS Fort Lauderdale (LSD 28)
- USS Constellation
- USS Torsk (SS-423)
- USNAV YP-698
- USACE M/V Reynolds
- USACE M/V Catlett
- USCGC Taney (WHEC-37)
- USCGC James Rankin (WLM-555)
- Chesapeake (LS-116)

== Portland ==
Portland, Oregon includes fleet week as a part of its annual Portland Rose Festival

== Seattle ==
Seattle, Washington includes fleet week during the annual Seafair. Seattle's Fleet Week was an outgrowth of its "Golden Potlatch" event that started in 1911. The Golden Potlatch was suspended in 1914, but was revived in 1934 as the "Seattle Potlatch of Progress and Fleet Week". This Fleet Week included a number of U.S. Navy ships.

=== Seattle Fleet Week 2018 ===
Ships included:

- USS Somerset (LPD-25)
- USS Momsen (DDG-92)
- USCGC Mellon (WHEC-717)
- HMCS Yellowknife (MM 706)
- HMCS Whitehorse (MM 705)

=== Seattle Fleet Week 2019 ===
Ships included:

- USS Mobile Bay (CG-53)
- USS Spruance (DDG-111)
- USCGC Active (WMEC-618)
- HMCS Edmonton (MM 703)
- HMCS Nanaimo (MM 702)
- Seattle fireboat Leschi

== Los Angeles ==
The USS Iowa (BB-61) museum hosts Fleet Week at the Port of Los Angeles in San Pedro. Inaugurated in 2011 as Los Angeles Navy Days, it was rebranded as L.A. Fleet Week in 2016.

=== Los Angeles Navy Days 2011 ===
July 29- August 1, 2011, San Pedro, CA. Ships included:

- USS Abraham Lincoln (CVN-72)
- USS Princeton (CG-59)
- USS Chafee (DDG-90)
- USS Champion (MCM-4)

=== Los Angeles Navy Days 2012 ===
August 17–20, 2012, San Pedro, CA. Ships included:

- USS Wayne E. Meyer (DDG-108)
- USCGC George Cobb (WLM-564)

=== Los Angeles Navy Days 2013 ===
- Canceled due to 2013 United States budget sequestration

=== Los Angeles Navy Days 2014 ===
August 8–10, 2014, San Pedro, CA. Ships included:

- USS Spruance (DDG-111)
- USS Anchorage (LPD-23)

=== Los Angeles Navy Days 2015 ===
August 7–9, 2015, San Pedro, CA. Ships included:

- USS Bunker Hill (CG-52)

=== Los Angeles Fleet Week 2016 ===
September 2–5, 2016, San Pedro, CA. Ships included:

- USS America (LHA-6)
- USS Champion (MCM-4)
- USS Wayne E. Meyer
- USCGC Active (WMEC-618)

=== Los Angeles Fleet Week 2017 ===
September 1–4, 2017, San Pedro, CA. Ships included:

- USS Pasadena (SSN-752)
- USS Anchorage (LPD-23)
- USS Dewey (DDG-105)
- USS Scout (MCM-8)
- USCGC Active (WMEC-618)
- HMCS Ottawa (FFH 341)

=== Los Angeles Fleet Week 2018 ===
August 31-September 3, 2018, San Pedro, CA. Ships included:

- USS Dewey (DDG-105)
- USS Manchester (LCS-14)
- USS Scout (MCM-8)
- USCGC Alert (WMEC-630)
- HMCS Ottawa (FFH 341)

=== Los Angeles Fleet Week 2019 ===
August 30–September 2, 2019, San Pedro, CA. Ships included:

- USS Comstock (LSD-45)
- USS Spruance (DDG-111)
- USS Tulsa (LCS-16)
- USS Scout (MCM-8)
- USCGC Alert (WMEC-630)
- USCGC Forrest Rednour (WPC-1129)

=== Los Angeles Fleet Week 2020 ===
- Cancelled due to the COVID-19 pandemic.

=== Los Angeles Fleet Week 2021 ===
- Cancelled due to the COVID-19 pandemic.

=== Los Angeles Fleet Week 2022 ===
May 27–30, 2022, San Pedro, CA. Ships included:

- USS Essex (LHD-2)
- USS Portland (LPD-27)

=== Los Angeles Fleet Week 2023 ===
May 26–29, 2023, San Pedro, CA. Ships included:

- USS Ashland (LSD-48)
- USS Cincinnati (LCS-20)
- USS Princeton (CG-59)
- USCGC Terrell Horne (WPC-1131)

=== Los Angeles Fleet Week 2024 ===
May 22–27, 2024, San Pedro, CA. Ships included:

- USS Carl Vinson (CVN-70)
- USCGC Terrell Horne (WPC-1131)
- ACTUV Sea Hunter (Display only)

=== Los Angeles Fleet Week 2025 ===
May 23-26, 2025, San Pedro, CA. Ships included:

- USS Mariner (OUSV-4) (Display only)
- USS Carl M. Levin (DDG-120)
- USS Harpers Ferry (LSD-49)
- USCG Eagle (WIX-327)

=== Los Angeles Fleet Week 2025 ===
May 22-25, 2026, San Pedro, CA. Ships included:

- USS Essex (LHD-2)
- USCGC Halibut (WPB-87340)
- USCGC Terrell Horne (WPC-1131)

== New London ==
New London, Connecticut sometimes includes Fleet Week as a part of the Connecticut Maritime Heritage Festival.

=== New London Fleet Week 2017 ===
Visiting ships included:

- USS Cole (DDG-67)
- USCGC Albacore (WPB-87309)
- USCGC Thunder Bay (WTGB-108)

=== New London Fleet Week 2018 ===
Visiting ships included:

- USS Lassen (DDG-82)
- USCGC Albacore (WPB-87309)
- USCGC Bollard (WYTL-65614)

=== New London Fleet Week 2019 ===
Visiting ships included:

- USS Sioux City (LCS-11)
- USCGC Eagle (WIX-327)
- USCGC Coho (WPB-87321)
- USCGC Bollard (WYTL-65614)
- SSV Oliver Hazard Perry

=== New London Fleet Week 2024 ===
Visiting ships will include:

- USCGC Eagle (WIX-327)
- USCGC Razorbill (WPB-87332)
- USCGC Ida Lewis (WLM-551)

== Norfolk ==
Naval Station Norfolk opens to the public and conducts ship tours during its Norfolk Fleet Fest.

=== Norfolk Fleet Fest 2018 ===
Participating ships included:

- USS George H. W. Bush (CVN-77)
- USS George Washington (CVN-73)
- USS Dwight D. Eisenhower (CVN-69)
- USS James E. Williams (DDG-95)
- USS Bainbridge (DDG-96)

=== Norfolk Fleet Fest 2019 ===
Participating ships included:

- USS John C. Stennis (CVN-74)
- USS San Jacinto (CG-56)

=== Norfolk Fleet Fest 2020 ===
- Cancelled due to the COVID-19 pandemic.

=== Norfolk Fleet Fest 2021 ===
- Cancelled due to the COVID-19 pandemic.

=== Norfolk Fleet Fest 2022 ===
- Cancelled due to the COVID-19 pandemic.

=== Norfolk Fleet Fest 2023 ===
Participating ships included:

- USS George Washington (CVN-73)
- USS James E. Williams (DDG-95)
- USCGC Rollin A. Fritch (WPC-1119)

=== Norfolk Fleet Fest 2024 ===
Participating ships included:

- USS Iwo Jima (LHD-7)
- USS Gonzalez (DDG-66)

=== Norfolk Fleet Fest 2025 ===
Participating ships included:

- USS Harry S. Truman (CVN-75)
- USS Gonzalez (DDG-66)

=== Norfolk Fleet Fest 2026 ===
Participating ships included:

- USS Nimitz (CVN-68)
- USS Mesa Verde (LPD-19)
- USCGC Frank Drew (WLM-557)

== San Diego ==
San Diego annually hosts Fleet Week.

=== San Diego Fleet Week 2003 ===
- USS Valley Forge (CG-50)
- USS Denver (LPD-9)

=== San Diego Fleet Week 2004 ===
- USS Decatur (DDG-73)
- USS O'Kane (DDG-77)

=== San Diego Fleet Week 2005 ===
- USS Decatur (DDG-73)
- USS Thach (FFG-43)

=== San Diego Fleet Week 2006 ===
- USS Pinckney (DDG-91)
- USS Ogden (LPD-5)
- USS Jarrett (FFG-33)
- USS Pearl Harbor (LSD-52)

=== San Diego Fleet Week 2007 ===
- USS Mobile Bay (CG-53)
- USS Chancellorsville (CG-62)
- USS New Orleans (LPD-18)

=== San Diego Fleet Week 2008 ===
- USS Sampson (DDG-102)
- USS Preble (DDG-88)
- USS Tarawa (LHA-1)

=== San Diego Fleet Week 2009 ===
- USS Princeton (CG-59)
- USS Makin Island (LHD-8)

=== San Diego Fleet Week 2010 ===
- USS Gary (FFG-51)
- USS Freedom (LCS-1)

=== San Diego Fleet Week 2011 ===
- USS Princeton (CG-59)
- USS Rushmore (LSD-47)
- USS Ronald Reagan (CVN-76)
- USS Benfold (DDG-65)
- HMCS Ottawa (FFH-341)

=== San Diego Fleet Week 2012 ===
- USS San Diego (LPD-22)
- USCGC Morgenthau (WHEC-722)
- USS Spruance (DDG-111)
- USS Halsey (DDG-97)

=== San Diego Fleet Week 2013 ===
- Canceled due to 2013 United States budget sequestration

=== San Diego Fleet Week 2014 ===
- USS Nimitz (CVN-68)
- USS Somerset (LPD-25)

=== San Diego Fleet Week 2015 ===
- USS Cape St. George (CG-71)
- USS Somerset (LPD-25)

=== San Diego Fleet Week 2016 ===
- USS Kidd (DDG-100)
- USCGC Sherman (WHEC-720)
- HMCS Winnipeg (FFH-338)

=== San Diego Fleet Week 2017 ===
- USS Anchorage (LPD-23)
- USCGC Midgett (WHEC-726)

=== San Diego Fleet Week 2018 ===
- USS Harpers Ferry (LSD-49)
- USCGC Mellon (WHEC-717)

=== San Diego Fleet Week 2019 ===
- USS San Diego (LPD-22)
- USCGC Robert Ward (WPC-1130)

=== San Diego Fleet Week 2020 ===
- Ship visits were cancelled due to the COVID-19 pandemic, but both virtual and limited in person events were still held.

=== San Diego Fleet Week 2021 ===
- USS Fort Worth (LCS-3)
- USCGC Benjamin Bottoms (WPC-1132)

=== San Diego Fleet Week 2022 ===
- USS Montgomery (LCS-8)
- USCGC Forrest O. Rednour (WPC-1129)

=== San Diego Fleet Week 2022 ===
- USS Jackson (LCS-6)
- USCGC Steadfast (WMEC-623)
- USCGC Forrest O. Rednour (WPC-1129)

=== San Diego Fleet Week 2023 ===
- USS Jackson (LCS-6)
- USCGC Steadfast (WMEC-623)

=== San Diego Fleet Week 2024 ===
- USS Tripoli (LHA-7)
- USS Germantown (LSD-42)
- USS Pinckney (DDG-91)
- USS Lenah Sutcliffe Higbee (DDG-123)
- USS Montgomery (LCS-8)

== Boston ==
Boston occasionally hosts Fleet Week as a part of larger events and sometimes as a part of their annual Marine Week.

=== Boston Fleet Week 2012 ===
Ships included:

- USS Constitution
- USS Wasp (LHD-1)
- USS Gravely (DDG-107)
- USCGC Eagle (WIX-327)
- USCGC Juniper (WLB-201)
- USCGC Marcus Hanna (WLM-554)
- HMCS Iroquois (DDG 280)
- HMCS Preserver (AOR 510)
- HMCS Goose Bay (MM 707)
- HMCS Moncton (MM 708)
- HMCS Kingston (MM 700)
- HMCS Summerside (MM 711)
- RFA Argus
- German frigate Hessen
- HNoMS Thor Heyerdahl (F314)
- HDMS Esbern Snare (L17)
- Cisne Branco
- ARC Gloria
- BAE Guayas (BE-21)
- KRI Dewaruci
- NOAAS Thomas Jefferson (S222)

=== Boston Fleet Week 2017 ===
Ships included:

- USS Whidbey Island (LSD-41)
- USS Constitution
- USCGC Eagle (WIX-327)
- BAP Unión
- HMCS Oriole
- BAE Guayas (BE-21)
- Chilean schooner Esmeralda
- SSV Oliver Hazard Perry

== New Orleans ==
New Orleans, though usually as a part of Navy Week, typically has naval vessels take part annually.

=== New Orleans Navy Week 2022 ===
Ships included:

- USS Lassen (DDG-82)
- USS Farragut (DDG-99)
- USCGC Daniel Tarr (WPC-1136)
- La Combattante (P735)

== Miami ==
=== Miami Fleet Week 2024 ===
Ships involved:

- USS Harry S. Truman (CVN-75)
- USS Bataan (LHD 5)
- USS Leyte Gulf (CG 55)
- USS Normandy (CG 60)
- USCGC Seneca (WMEC-906)

== Other cities ==
Fleet Week and similar traditions in other cities include:

- OpSail events are sometimes accompanied by warships and opened to the public in various Fleet Week style events, or sometimes combined.
- Pearl Harbor, Hawaii often hosts ship tours prior to major naval exercises such as RIMPAC

== Other countries ==
=== Kiel Week ===
The German city of Kiel annually hosts Kiel Week, largely a sailing event, warships usually take part and open to the public in the same manner as Fleet Week.

=== Vancouver Fleet Weekend 2022 ===
The city of Vancouver, British Columbia hosted Fleet Weekend for the first time in 2022. Visiting ships were:

- HMCS Vancouver (FFH 331)
- HMCS Winnipeg (FFH 338)
- HMCS Brandon (MM 710)
- HMCS Edmonton (MM 703)
- HMCS Raven (PCT 56)
- HMCS Cougar (PCT 61)
- HMCS Moose (PCT 62)

=== Vancouver Fleet Weekend 2024 ===
Visiting ships included:

- HMCS Vancouver (FFH 331)
- HMCS Regina (FFH 334)
- HMCS Max Bernays (AOPV 432)

=== Halifax International Fleet Week 2023 ===
The city of Halifax, Nova Scotia hosted its first fleet week in September 2023. Visiting ships were:

- HMCS Fredericton (FFH 337)
- HMCS Margaret Brooke (AOPV 431)
- HMCS Glace Bay (MM 701)
- HMCS Moncton (MM 708)
- USS Porter (DDG-78)
- HMS Portland (F79)

=== Halifax International Fleet Week 2025 ===
Immediately after Operation Cutlass Fury 2025, an ASW operation off the coast of Nova Scotia, three of the participants docked in Halifax for fleet week. It involved a Navy band, multiple ceremonies, a dragon boat race, rugby match, and 37 kilometres (23 mi) bike race starting at CFB Shearwater. Visiting ships were:

- HDMS Vædderen (F359)
- HMCS Margaret Brooke (AOPV 431)
- HMCS Charlottetown (FFH 339)

=== Rendez-vous naval de Quebec 2024 ===
Quebec City will host its fleet week from July 4–7, 2024. Visiting ships will be:

- HMCS Fredericton
- HMCS William Hall
- USS Carney
- HMS Protector
- Rhône

== See also ==
- Navy Weeks
