= USCGC Willow (WLB-202) =

U.S. Coast Guard seagoing buoy tender

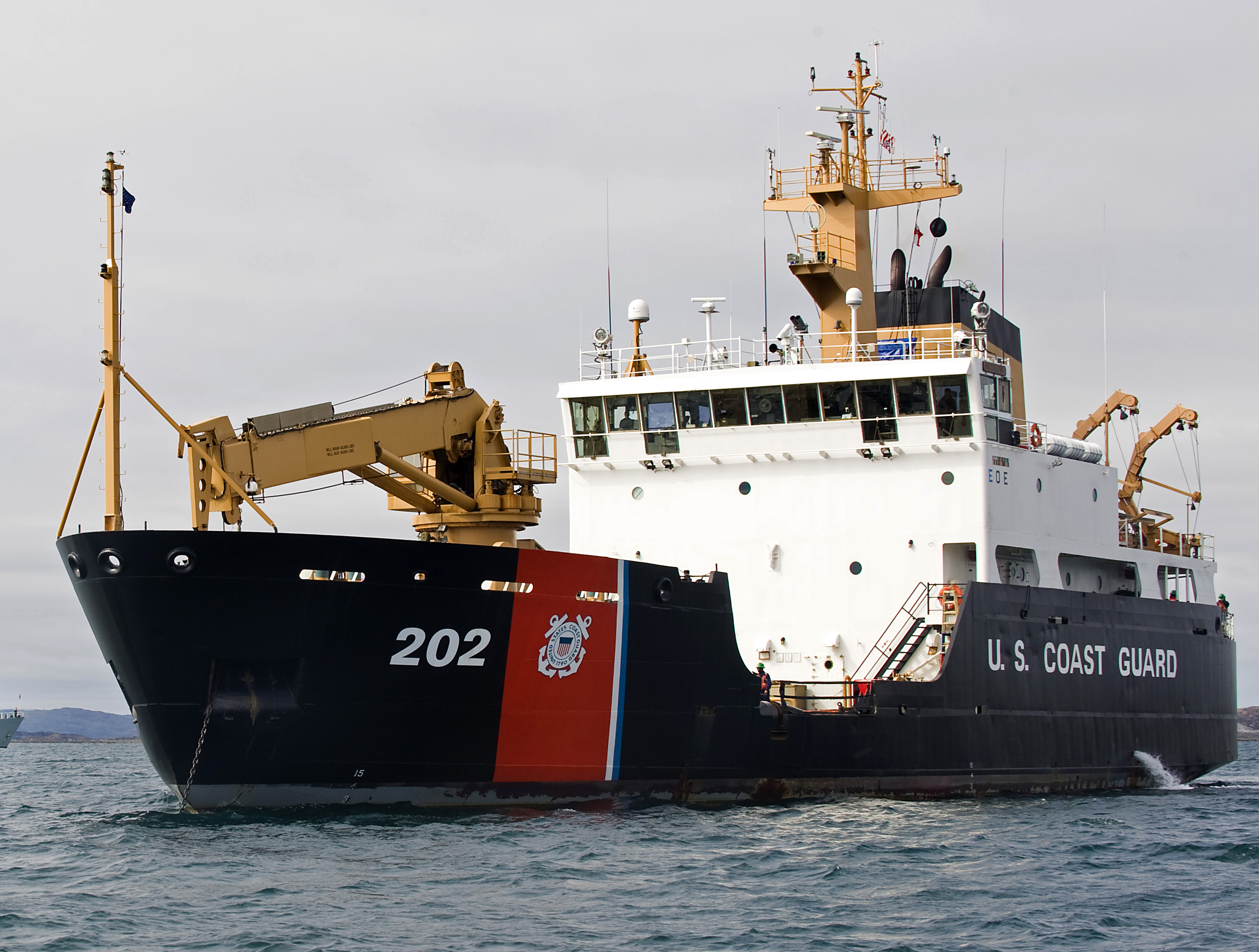
- USCGC Willow in August 2011

History

United States
- Name: USCGC Willow (WLB-202)
- Namesake: Willow tree
- Builder: Marinette Marine Corporation, Marinette, Wisconsin, U.S.
- Launched: June 1996
- Commissioned: April 1997
- Homeport: Charleston, South Carolina
- Identification: IMO number: 9155547; MMSI number: 368782000; Callsign: NIIW
- Motto: IN OMNIA PARATUS (Prepared for Everything)
- Status: in active service
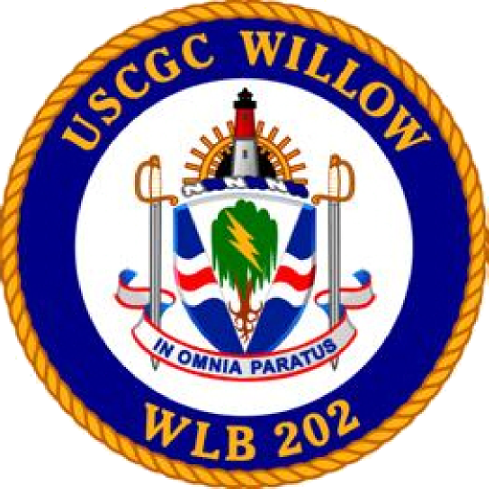
- Badge

General characteristics
- Class & type: Juniper-class seagoing buoy tender
- Displacement: 2,000 long tons (2,000 t) full load
- Length: 225 ft (69 m)
- Beam: 46 ft (14 m)
- Draft: 13 ft (4.0 m)
- Speed: 15 kn (28 km/h; 17 mph) at full load displacement; (75% rated power)
- Range: 6,000 nmi (11,000 km; 6,900 mi) at 12 kn (22 km/h; 14 mph)
- Complement: 8 officers, 40 enlisted

The USCGC Willow (WLB-202) is a United States Coast Guard seagoing buoy tender, the third of her name and the second of the Juniper-class. She is home-ported in Charleston, South Carolina, where she replaced her sister ship USCGC Oak in servicing 257 aids to navigation in District 7. Willow's area of operations stretches from South Carolina down to Caribbean, including Puerto Rico, Cuba, U.S. Virgin Islands and Haiti. In addition to her primary aids-to-navigation (ATON) role, Willow also performs other duties, such as maritime border security, marine environmental protection, maritime law enforcement, and search and rescue. The Willow transitioned from her former home port of Newport, RI in 2017 after spending over a year in a Baltimore dry dock being refitted and modernized.

== Construction and characteristics ==
USCGC Willow was built by the Marinette Marine Corporation in Wisconsin, launched in June 1996 and commissioned in April 1997. She has a length of 225 ft (69 m), a beam of 46 ft (14 m), and a draft of 13 ft (4.0 m). Willow is propelled by two Caterpillar diesel engines rated at 3,100 horsepower, and has a top speed of 16 knots. She has a single controllable-pitch propeller, which along with bow and stern thrusters, allow the ship to be maneuvered to set buoys close offshore and in restricted waters. A dynamic global positioning system coupled with machinery plant controls and a chart display and information system allow station-keeping of the ship with an accuracy of within five meters of the planned position without human intervention. Willow is also equipped with an oil-skimming system known as the Spilled Oil Recovery System (SORS), which is used in her mission of maritime environmental protection. The cutter has a 2,875 square foot buoy deck area with a crane that is used for servicing large ocean buoys.

== Mission ==
USCGC Willow has an area of responsibility within the Seventh Coast Guard District between South Carolina, and the Caribbean Sea. While her primary mission is servicing ATON, she is also tasked with maritime law enforcement, marine pollution prevention and response, treaty enforcement, defense and homeland security, and search and rescue. Willow is also responsible for the periodic servicing of weather buoys operated by the National Data Buoy Center of the National Oceanic and Atmospheric Administration (NOAA). Willow has an icebreaking capability of 14 in (0.36 m) at 3 knots and 3 ft (0.91 m) backing and ramming.

== History ==
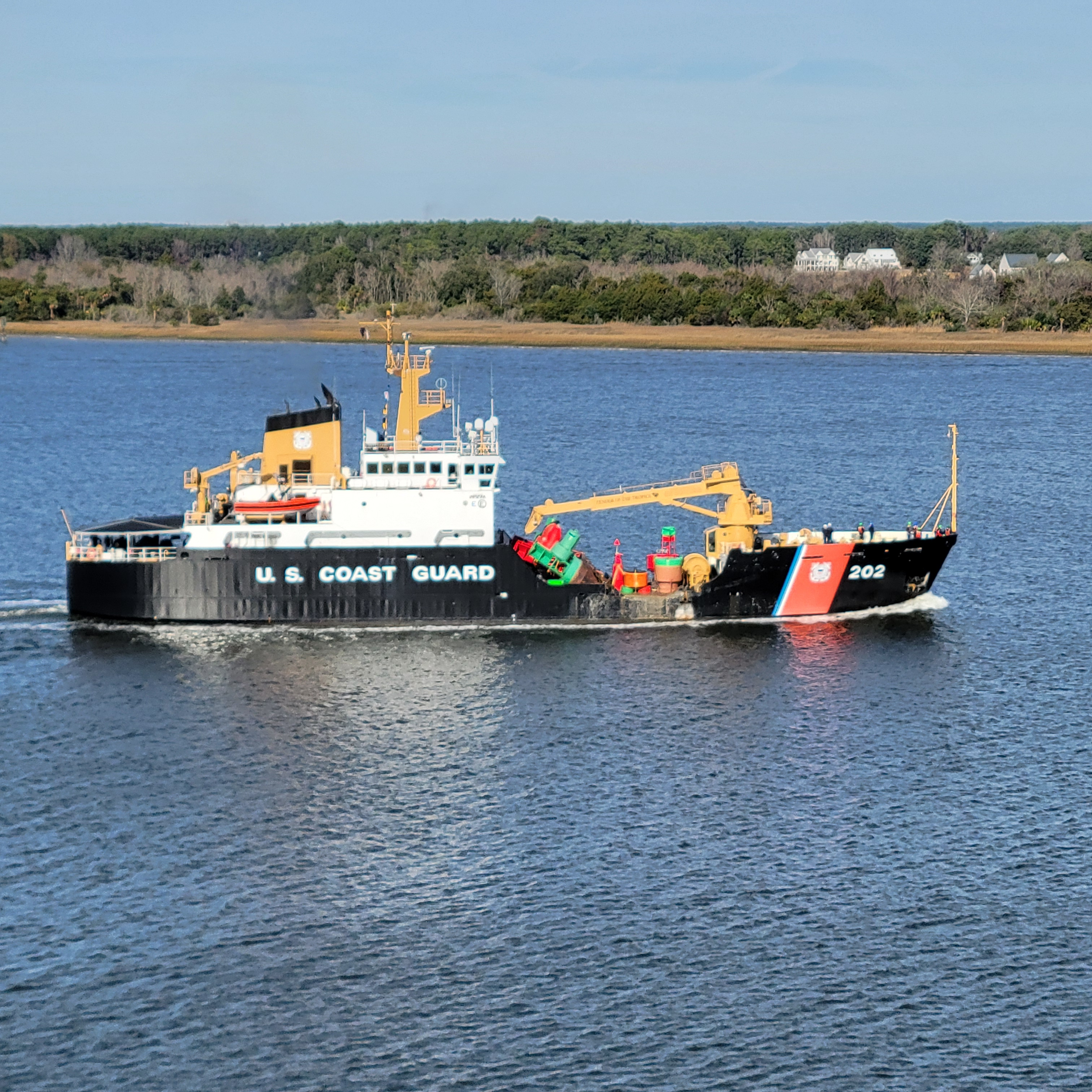
USCGC Willow in the Cooper River, South Carolina, in January 2024

Upon commissioning, Willow conducted the first trans-Atlantic crossing by a U.S. Coast Guard buoy tender in 33 years. On her 68-day voyage she represented the United States in several international festivals and events and made port calls in Ireland, Portugal, France, and Germany. Willow has made a cruise to the Straits of Florida to conduct alien migration interdiction operations. During May 2011, she attended Fleet Week in New York Harbor along with other U.S. Coast Guard cutters. In August 2011, Willow participated in Operation Nanook with Canadian Forces ships HMCS St. John's, HMCS Moncton, and HMCS Summerside. The ten day joint exercise was used to practice search and rescue techniques in an arctic environment as well as exercise arctic sovereignty for the United States and Canada. Willow was the first Coast Guard ATON asset to reach New York City after Hurricane Sandy struck in October 2012. She assisted in the re-opening of New York Harbor by resetting and replacing damaged buoys to mark shipping channels thereby allowing other ships carrying urgently needed gasoline and heating oil safe passage to the harbor. In 2022, she underwent a major maintenance availability at the Brooklyn Navy Yard. In addition to her primary mission of Aids to Navigation, she completed four Migrant Interdiction Operation deployments in support of Operation Vigilant Sentry from 2022 to 2024.

== See also ==
- USCG seagoing buoy tender

== Notes ==
Citations

References used

- "225-foot Seagoing Buoy Tender (WLB)". Cutters, Craft & U.S. Coast Guard-Manned Army & Navy Vessels. U.S. Coast Guard Historian's Office.
- "CGC Willow (WLB-202)". United States Coast Guard.
- "Fleet Week begins with parade of ships through New York Harbor". Staten Island Advance website. 25 May 2011.
- "Marinette Marine Corp., Marinette WI". Index to U.S. Shipbuilders and Boatbuilders. shipbuildinghistory.com website. Archived from the original on 7 December 2011.
- "Ships to leave St. John's on arctic sovereignty mission Friday". Moncton: The Telegram website. 4 August 2011.
- "Symbolism of Willow's Crest". CGC Willow (WLB-202). U.S. Coast Guard.
- "Willow: Past and Present". CGC Willow (WLB-202). U.S. Coast Guard.
- Shuntich, Natalie J. (6 November 2012). "Willow works the waterways". COAST GUARD Compass Official Blog of the U.S. Coast Guard. U.S. Coast Guard. Archived from the original on 7 April 2014.
