= HMCS Moncton =

Several Canadian naval units have been named HMCS Moncton.

- HMCS Moncton (K139) (I), a Flower-class corvette that served in the Royal Canadian Navy during the Battle of the Atlantic.
- HMCS Moncton (MM 708) (II), a Kingston-class coastal defence vessel in the Canadian Forces, commissioned in 1998.

== Battle honours ==
- Atlantic, 1942–1944.
