= Air & Sea Show =

Annual air show in Florida, U.S.

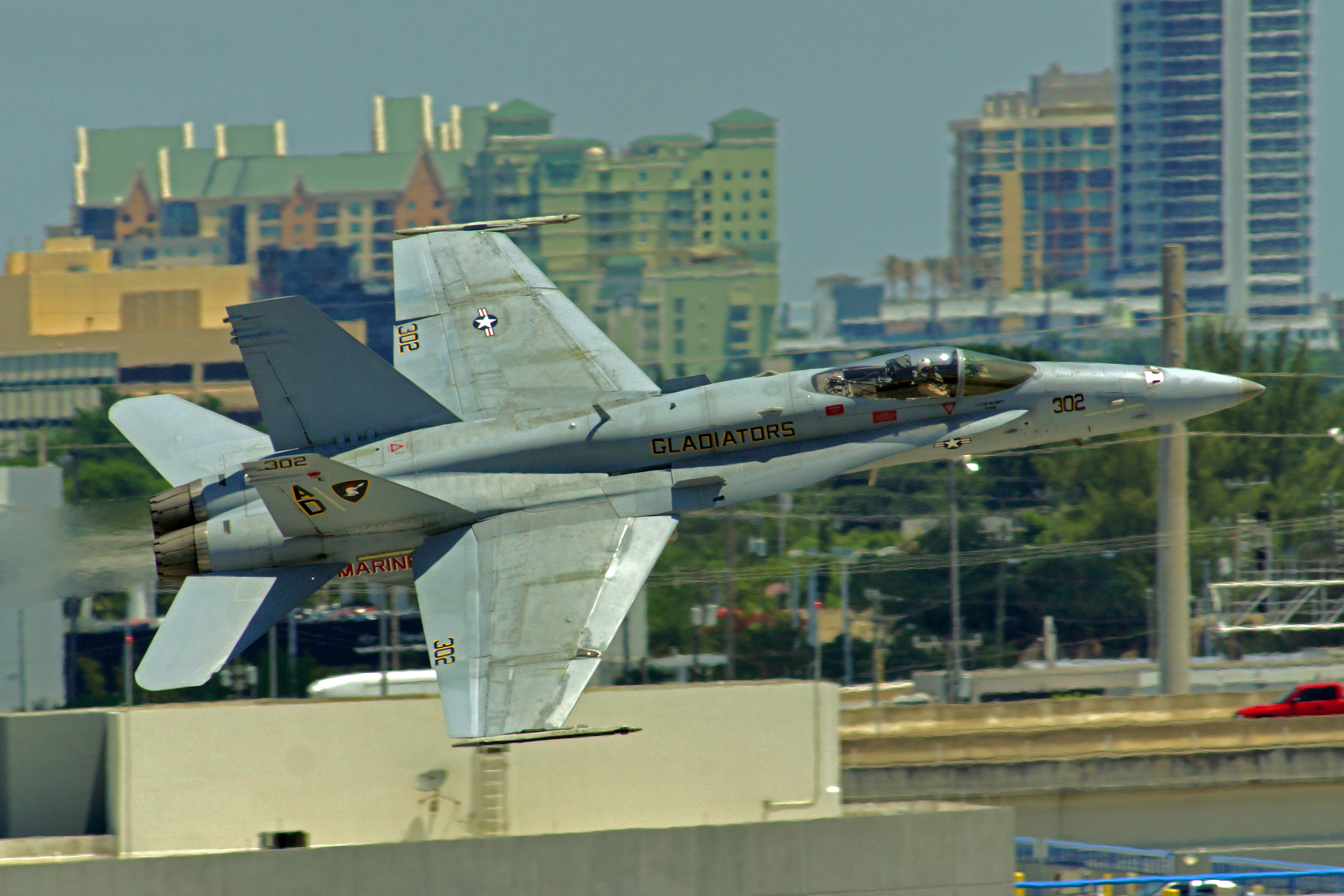
- F/A-18 Hornet flying in Ft. Lauderdale during 2016 Air Show
- Frequency: Annually
- Locations: Fort Lauderdale; Miami Beach
- Country: United States of America
- Inaugurated: May 6, 1995
- Founder: Mickey Markoff
- Most recent: May 24, 2025
- Sponsors: Shell (1995-1998); McDonald's (2002-2007); Hyundai Motor America (2017-present)

The Air & Sea Show is an annual air show founded by producer Mickey Markoff in 1995 in South Florida. The show usually took place on the first weekend of May in Fort Lauderdale, and drew hundreds of thousands of people to the beach to watch. In recent years, the event has been scheduled during Memorial Day Weekend in Miami Beach, Florida around Lummus Park, Miami Beach.

The event includes military and civilian performances, and was designed to help the U.S. military with recruiting, morale, retention, and to reconnect the U.S. military with the American public, giving it the unofficial nickname of Super Bowl of Air Shows. It has since developed into a tribute to veterans and active service members, and has been rebranded as 'A National Salute to America's Heroes". The show has been produced and promoted by Mickey Markoff since its inception in 1995.

== History ==
Since its inception in 1995, it featured many unique aircraft and display teams like the Brazilian Air Force Smoke Squadron, the Royal Canadian Air Force Snowbirds, the ShowCopters, the Northern Lights, an L-39 Albatros and a replica of the Fokker Dr.I painted as the Red Baron. Civilian performers included Kirby Chambliss, Ian Groom, Jim LeRoy, Wayne Handley, Freddie Cabanas, Gene Soucy, the Red Baron Pizza Squadron, the Lima Lima Flight Team, the Starfighters Inc F-104s and a South African Airways Boeing 747-400 flyby. From 2001 to 2007 the Air & Sea Show occurred as an extension of Fleet Week, with appearances by many military aircraft and ships, such as the U.S. Air Force's B-52, B-1 Lancer, B-2 Spirit, F-117 Nighthawk, C-5 Galaxy, A-10, F-15C, and F-16 East and West Coast demonstration teams, F-15E Strike Eagle Demonstration Team in 2006, the U.S. Navy F-14 Tomcat, F/A-18 Hornet, and F/A-18E/F Super Hornet and the U.S. Air Force F-22 Raptor in 2007 along with the United States Marine Corps AV-8B Harrier II, V-22 Osprey and AH-64 Apache from the Florida Army National Guard. Display teams such as the Blue Angels and the Thunderbirds and parachute teams such as the U.S. Navy Leap Frogs, the U.S. Army Golden Knights, and the Air Force STARS were also featured. Notable performances were search and rescue demonstrations from the United States Air Force Reserve 920th Rescue Wing and the United States Coast Guard as well as a beach invasion from various Navy and Marine Corps units. Unofficially, the event has been nicknamed "The Super Bowl of Air Shows". The show was canceled in late 2007 after it was unable to find a new title sponsor after McDonald's decided it would no longer would be taking on that role.

In 2017 the Air and Sea Show returned, this time at Miami Beach, Florida on Memorial Day weekend featuring an all military lineup.

The 2018 show went on although some of the performers had to cancel on Saturday because of heavy rain and wind from Subtropical Storm Alberto. The sea portion of the show was cancelled on Sunday but the air show went on. Performers included the F-35 Heritage Flight Team and a flyby/demonstration combo of a C-17 from Wright-Patterson Air Force Base.

The 2019 show featured the newly formed F-35A Lightning II Demonstration Team and the Blue Angels who originally were scheduled to perform in Pennsylvania. The lineup included three parachute teams, the Golden Knights of the Army, the Leap Frogs of the Navy, and the United States Army Special Operations Command Black Daggers along with an F-15 of the Louisiana Air National Guard, the B-52, C-17 Globemaster III, A-10 Thunderbolt IIs, search and rescue from Coast Guard Air Station Miami, drug interdiction exercise from U.S. Customs and Border Protection and the Commemorative Air Force Red Tail Squadron P-51C Mustang.

The 2020 show was originally scheduled on May 23 and 24 with the Thunderbirds headlining but was cancelled due to COVID-19. The 2020 event was pivoted to honor frontline workers fighting the pandemic with a flyover of the Blue Angels.

The 2021 show featured, along with the U.S. Air Force Reserve Para-Rescue demonstration which consisted of the 920th Rescue Wing and A-10s of the Maryland Air National Guard, Customs and Border Protection drug interdiction exercise, and Coast Guard search-and-rescue, flybys of a B-52 Stratofortress from Barksdale Air Force Base, an F-16 Fighting Falcon from Homestead Air Reserve Base, CH-53E Super Stallions from Marine Corps Air Station New River, F-15 Eagles from the Louisiana and Florida Air National Guard, B-2 Spirit from Whiteman Air Force Base and joint formation flyovers of trainer aircraft from Laughlin Air Force Base, Sheppard Air Force Base and Randolph Air Force Base as well as 4 A-10s from Moody Air Force Base alongside a KC-135 Stratotanker from Andrews Air Force Base. Demonstrations included the Commemorative Air Force Red Tail Squadron P-51C Mustang "By Request", the United States Army Golden Knights, USASOC Black Daggers and the debut of the British Army Red Devils (Parachute Regiment) Display Team. The show was originally slated to include a concert, but was cancelled due to concerns over budget.

The 2022 event featured the USAF's F-16 Viper and the Navy's F/A-18 Super Hornet demonstration teams along with the Coast Guard and Para-Rescue search-and-rescue demonstrations and Customs and Border Protection's drug interdiction exercise. F-16s of the 482nd Fighter Wing, B-52 Stratofortress, and B-1 Lancers performed flybys while the C-17 Globemaster III from Wright-Patterson Air Force Base did a brief demonstration. For the first time in the show's history, the Army's Golden Knights and Black Daggers alongside the Navy's Leap Frogs and British Army Red Devils participated in the event. The event culminated in an evening concert headlined by 3 Doors Down and a fireworks extravaganza on Saturday night. A majority of the performances occurred on Sunday before thunderstorms forced the event to be cut short.

The 2023 show debuted the Army SaluteFest which showcased Army assets on Saturday along with a nighttime drone show and performances by Natti Natasha, JVKE, Chris Janson and Breland. New performances included a demonstration from the Army Special Operations Command with UH-60 Black Hawks and AH-64 Apaches from the 82nd Airborne Division in securing a hijacked ship and the beachhead. The United States Air Force's F-35A Lightning II Demonstration Team headlined the event along with flying next to an A-1 Skyraider for the Heritage Flight. The Skyraider also flew with the F/A-18E/F Super Hornet for the Navy Legacy Flight on Sunday only. The show ended with a missing man formation from the Army's Golden Knights, the Navy's Leap Frogs and the British Army Red Devils. The event culminated in a concert on Sunday with the Air Force Band and the Air Force Honor Guard Drill Team before Big & Rich closed out the weekend with a fireworks spectacular.

The 2024 show included the debut of the United States Marine Corps F-35B Lightning II from VMFAT-501 and the Altus Joint Demonstration Team and flybys of a Bell 412 from the National Nuclear Security Administration. The event was highlighted by a formation flyover of the B-1, B-2 and B-52 bombers which occurred on Saturday.

The 2025 version featured, along with usual performers, the F-22 Raptor Demonstration Team for the first time since 2017 as well as the Marine Corps. MV-22 Osprey from VMM-261. The highlight of the event was the Freedom Flyover which consisted of the bombers escorted by an A-10, F-15, F-16 and F-22 additionally with the return of the bomber triad flyover.

The 2026 show took place on May 23-24 with the Thunderbirds headlining the event, making their debut after they were forced to cancel their 2020 appearance due to COVID. The highlight of the show was the Arsenal of Freedom Flyover which consisted of a B-52 flanked by two F-16s, an A-10, F/A-18 Super Hornet, F-22, F-35B and a B-1. The F-35B East Coast Demonstration Team from VMFAT-501 also flew for the first time since 2024.

== Notes ==
From 1995 to 1998, Shell Oil Company was the show's sponsor with McDonald's owning sponsorship from 2002 to 2007. Hyundai Motor America is the current sponsor for the Air & Sea Show.

== Accidents and incidents ==
On April 30, 2004, while practicing for the Air & Sea Show, signature performer Ian Groom died of blunt force trauma when his Sukhoi Su-31 dove into the Atlantic Ocean. Witnesses said the aircraft was in a nose-down attitude and spun into the water after performing a flat spin. A spokesperson of Groom's said it was likely he blacked out during the flat spin.

== See also ==
- Sun 'n Fun – annual Central Florida fly-in and air show
