= USCGC Terrell Horne =

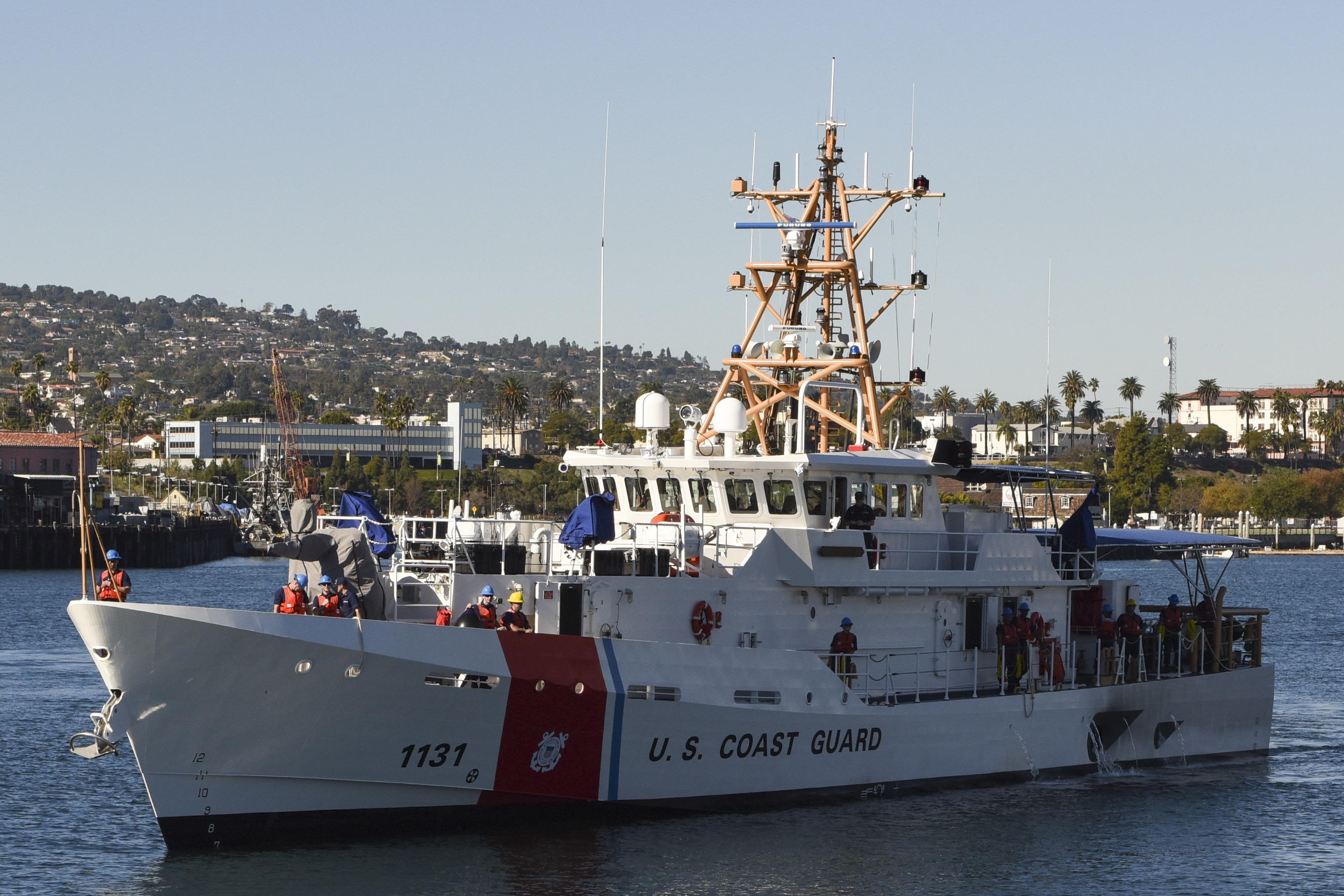
- Terrell Horne arriving in San Pedro, California

History

United States
- Name: Terrell Horne
- Namesake: Terrell Horne
- Operator: United States Coast Guard
- Builder: Bollinger Shipyards, Lockport, Louisiana
- Acquired: October 25, 2018
- Commissioned: March 22, 2019
- Home port: San Pedro, California
- Identification: MMSI number: 338926431; Callsign: NTHE
- Status: in active service
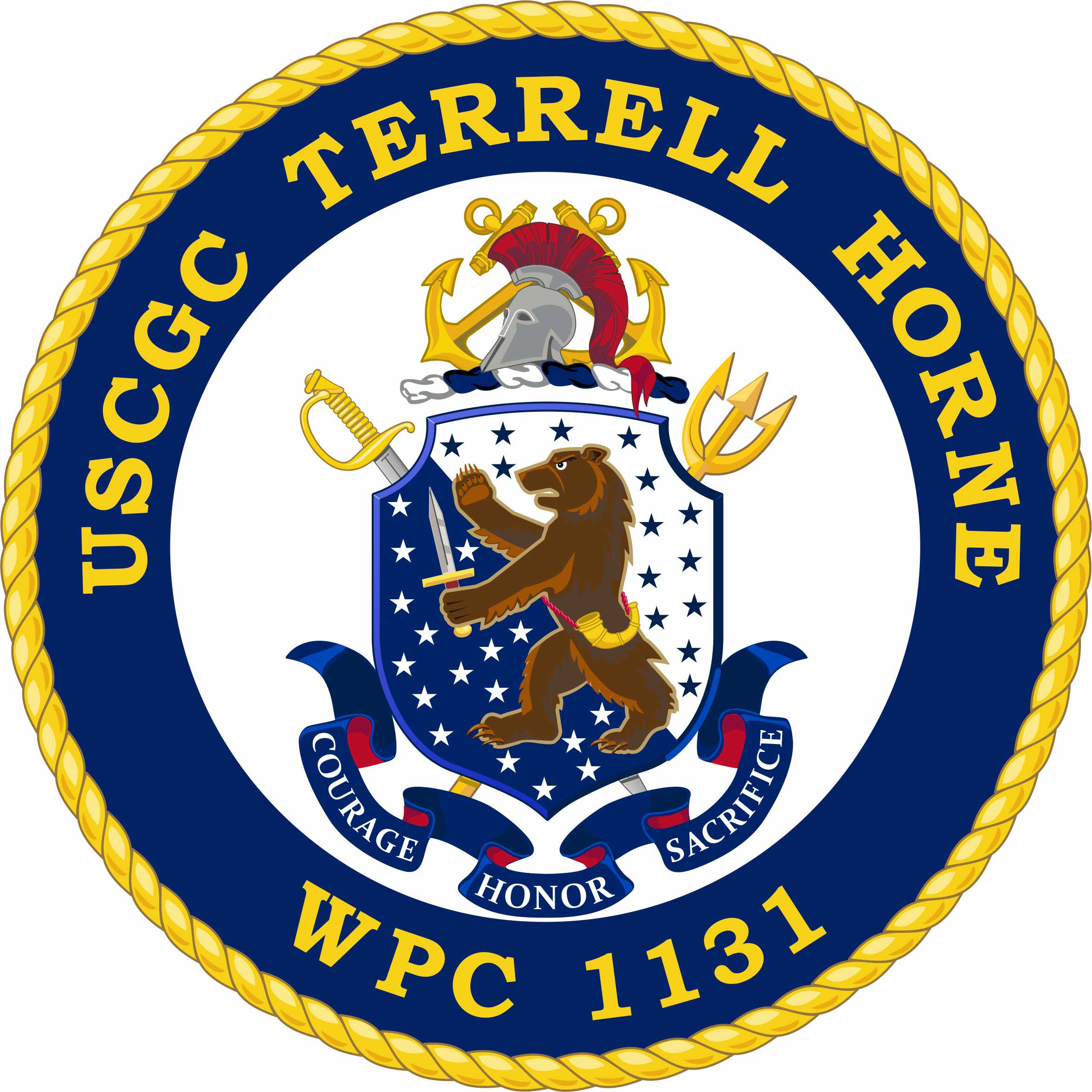
- Badge

General characteristics
- Class & type: Sentinel-class cutter
- Displacement: 353 long tons (359 t)
- Length: 154 ft (47 m)
- Beam: 8.11 m (26.6 ft)
- Depth: 2.9 m (9.5 ft)
- Propulsion: 2 × 4,300 kW (5,800 shp); 1 × 75 kW (101 shp) bow thruster
- Speed: 28 knots (52 km/h; 32 mph) checked
- Range: 2,100 nautical miles (3,900 km; 2,400 mi)
- Endurance: 5 days
- Boats & landing craft carried: 1 × Over the Horizon Interceptor
- Complement: 4 officers, 20 crew

USCGC Terrell Horne (WPC-1131) is the United States Coast Guard's 24th Sentinel-class cutter. She is the third of four of her class to be homeported in Long Beach, California.

== Operational history ==
In October 2023, Terrell Horne completed the first high-seas boarding and inspection patrol off the coast of Peru, intended to combat illegal, unreported, or unregulated fishing in the South Pacific as part of Operation Southern Shield. During this, she assisted in a search and rescue, and brought an injured fisherman back to shore for treatment.

== Namesake ==
Like her sisters, she is named after a Coast Guard who distinguished themselves in the line of duty. She is named after Terrell Horne, who was killed in December 2012 while intercepting smugglers, who intentionally rammed into the boat he and other Coast Guardsmen were on, fatally wounding him. He is credited with pushing another crew member to safety before being killed.
