= USCGC Active (WMEC-618) =

American Coast Guard cutter

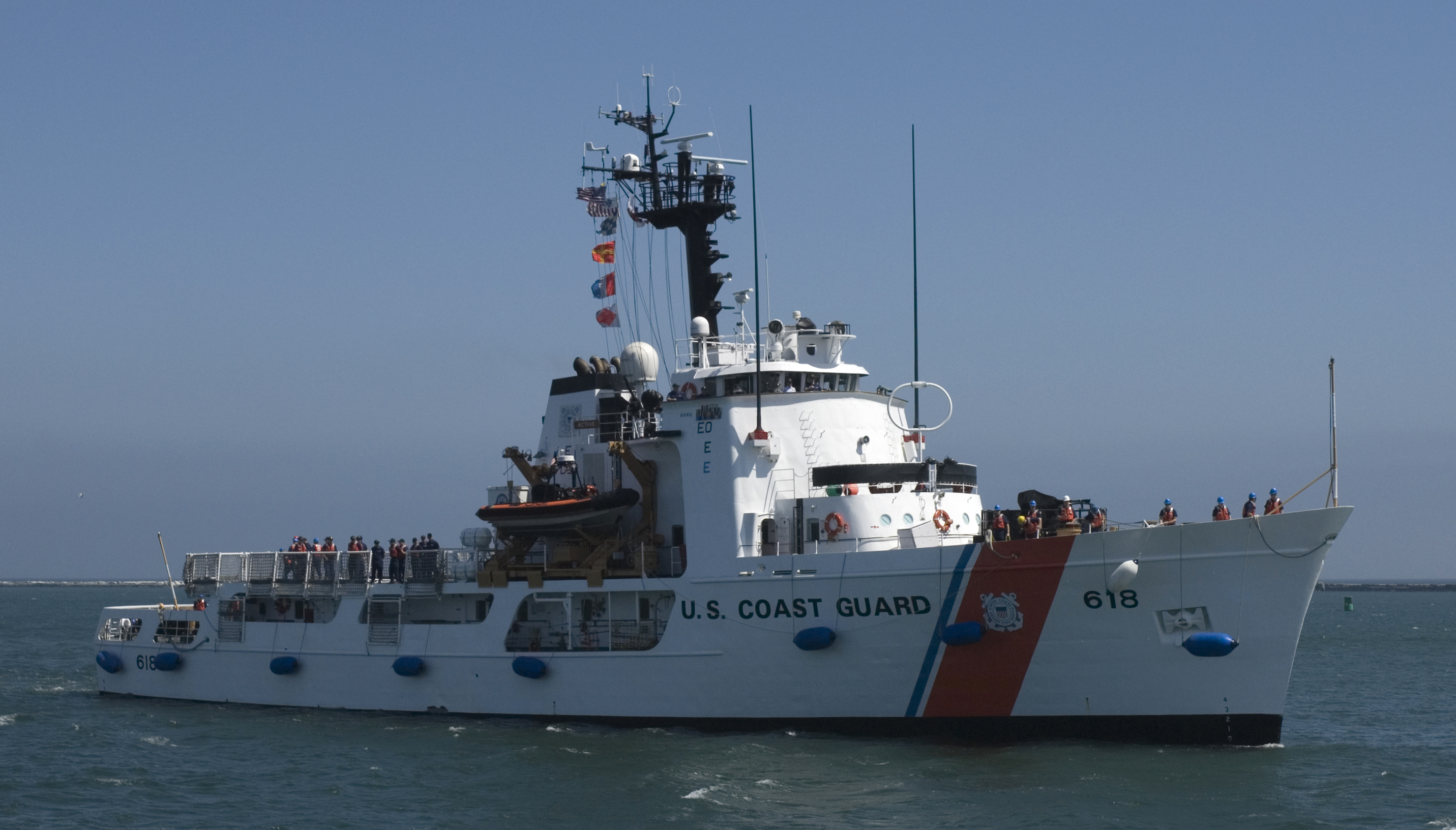
- USCGC Active (WMEC-618)

History

United States
- Builder: Christy Corporation, Sturgeon Bay, Wisconsin
- Launched: July 31, 1965
- Commissioned: September 1, 1966
- Home port: Port Angeles, Washington
- Identification: MMSI number: 367269000; Callsign: NRTF
- Nickname(s): Li'l Tough Guy
- Status: Active
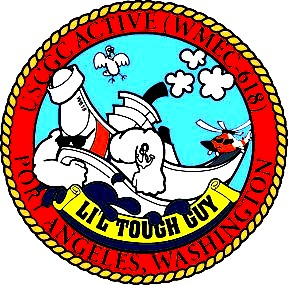
- Badge

General characteristics
- Displacement: 1108 tons
- Length: 210 ft 6 in (64.16 m)
- Beam: 34 ft (10 m)
- Draught: 13 ft (4.0 m)
- Propulsion: 2 x V16 2550 horsepower ALCO diesel engines
- Speed: max 18 knots (33 km/h); 2,200-nautical-mile (4,070 km) range
- Range: cruise 15 knots (28 km/h); 5,000-nautical-mile (9,260 km) range
- Complement: 12 officers, 63 enlisted
- Sensors & processing systems: 2 x AN/SPS-73
- Armament: 1 × Mk 38 25 mm machine gun; 2 × M2HB .50 caliber machine gun
- Aircraft carried: HH-65 Dolphin

USCGC Active (WMEC-618) is a United States Coast Guard medium endurance cutter. Active was launched at Christy Corporation, Sturgeon Bay, Wisconsin on July 31, 1965. Commissioned on September 1, 1966, she is 210 feet (64 m) long, has a 34-foot (10 m) beam, displaces 1108 tons, and draws 13 feet (4.0 m) of water. She is powered by two diesel engines, combined for a total of 5,000 hp (3,700 kW). Quarters are provided for up to 12 officers and 70 enlisted members. Active's cruising range is 5,000 nautical miles (9,000 km) at 15 knots (28 km/h), designed with an operating endurance of about 30 days. At her top speed of 18 knots (33 km/h), Active has an approximate range of 2,200 nautical miles (4,070 km). Active's armament consists of a single 25 mm gun on the forecastle. The forecastle, bridge and fantail can also mount .50 caliber machine guns. The Active has a flight deck which allows for the deployment of a Coast Guard HH-65 Dolphin. USCGC Active has received several awards in recent years for its outstanding service to the maritime community, including oil spill clean ups in Prince William Sound, Alaska during the Exxon Valdez oil spill.

== Missions ==
Active is assigned primarily to law enforcement and search and rescue duties. The law enforcement duties involve counter-narcotic operations, fisheries, and environmental protection. To add to its diverse mission capability, Active also participates in public relations activities such as the Portland Rose Festival and Seattle Sea Fair.

Active has received several awards in recent years for its outstanding service to the maritime community. Active was awarded a Meritorious Unit Commendation for exemplary service from 1987 to 1989 and a Coast Guard Unit Commendation for outstanding service from 1989 to 1991. Active was awarded the Special Operations Service Ribbon for the Exxon Valdez oil spill cleanup in Prince William Sound, Alaska, participation in the Portland Rose Festival, the Coast Guard Bicentennial celebration at San Francisco Fleet Week in October 1992, and for the 1994 at sea apprehension of the motor vessel Jin Yinn No. 1 carrying 123 illegal Chinese migrants. Active has been awarded fifteen Cutter Achievement Ribbons for “clean sweeps” of all training requirements during Tailored Ships Training Availability. Active has also received two National Defense Service ribbons. Active was awarded a Coast Guard Unit Commendation for exceptional meritorious service from 12 to 26 August 1997 for the interdiction of the motor vessel Lapas No. 3 carrying 60 illegal Chinese migrants. In August 1998, Active participated in a cooperative counter-drug operation with Mexican authorities that resulted in the interdiction of the fishing vessel Lady Donna and the seizure of 2.55 metric tons of cocaine. Active earned the Special Operations Service Ribbon for actions in a November 1998 counter-drug operation with Canadian authorities resulting in the apprehension of the fishing vessel Blue Dawn and the seizure of 14 tons of hashish.

Active received the Coast Guard Meritorious Unit Commendation for exceptional meritorious service on 23 and 24 January 2000 in interdicting the Mexican fishing vessel Valera, resulting in the seizure of 5.5 metric tons of cocaine. On May 2, 2001 Active seized the Belize flagged fishing vessel Svesda Maru with 13.2 tons of cocaine, the largest maritime cocaine seizure in history and was awarded the Meritorious Unit Commendation Award.

Active's deployments are normally scheduled for 60 to 75 days. Inport periods for maintenance are scheduled between deployments, lasting six to eight weeks. Every four years the ship undergoes a major maintenance period lasting six to eight weeks.
