= USNS Newport =

Spearhead-class expeditionary fast transport

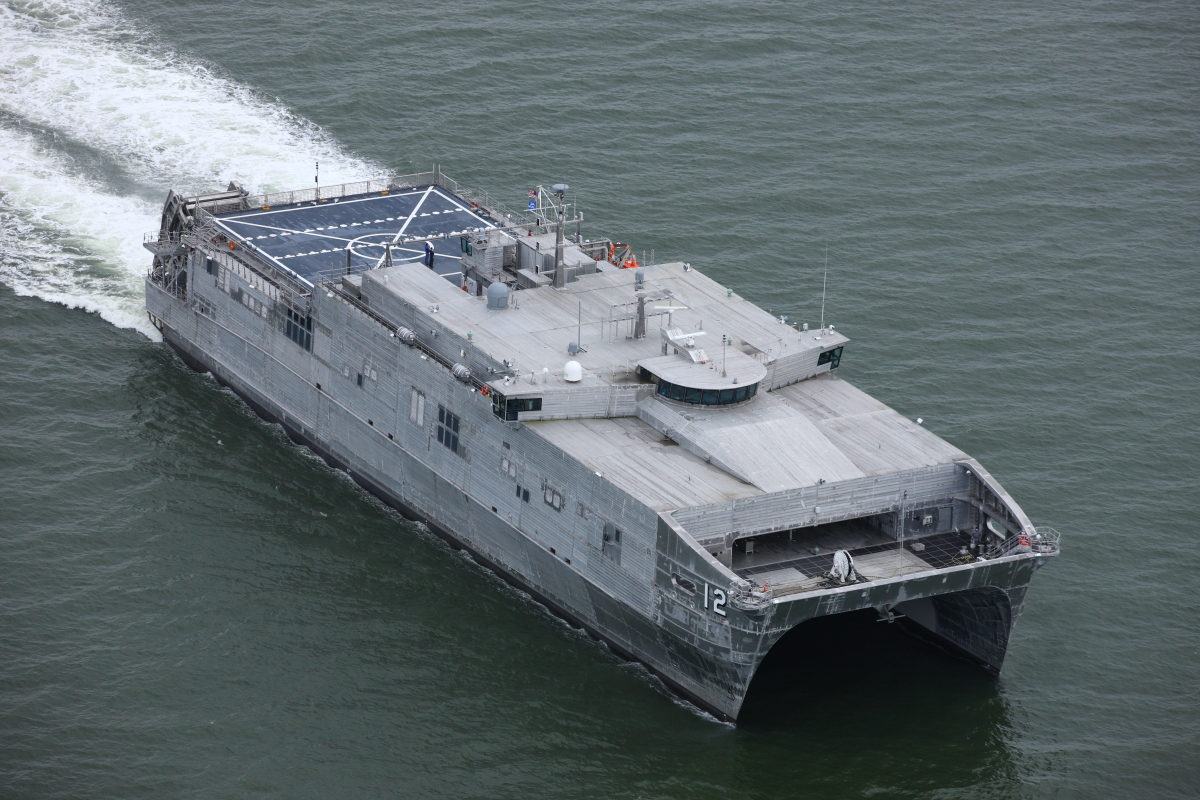
- USNS Newport underway during her integrated sea trials on 30 July 2020

History

United States
- Name: Newport
- Namesake: Newport
- Operator: Military Sealift Command
- Awarded: 15 September 2016
- Builder: Austal USA
- Laid down: 29 January 2019
- Launched: 20 February 2020
- Sponsored by: Charlotte Marshall
- Christened: 9 November 2019
- In service: 2 September 2020
- Identification: IMO number: 9851098; MMSI number: 368926317; Callsign: NNPT; Hull number: T-EPF-12
- Motto: In Omnia Paratus; (Prepared In All Things)
- Status: Active
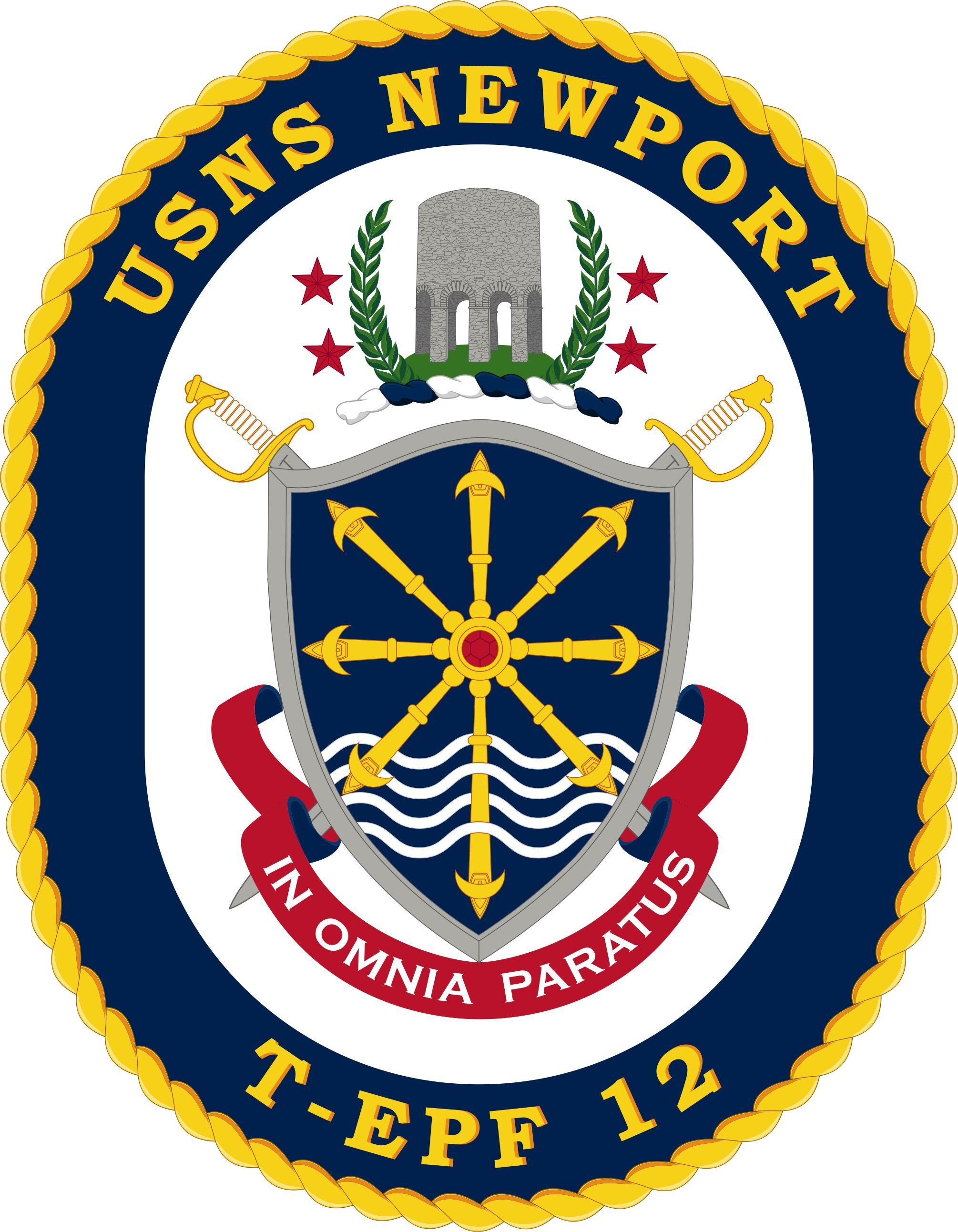
- Badge

General characteristics
- Class & type: Spearhead class expeditionary fast transport
- Length: 103.0 m (337 ft 11 in)
- Beam: 28.5 m (93 ft 6 in)
- Draft: 3.83 m (12 ft 7 in)
- Propulsion: 4 × MTU 20V8000 M71L diesel engines; 4 × ZF 60000NR2H reduction gears
- Speed: 43 knots (80 km/h; 49 mph)
- Troops: 312
- Crew: Capacity of 41, 22 in normal service
- Aviation facilities: Landing pad for medium helicopter

USNS Newport (T-EPF-12) is the twelfth Spearhead-class expeditionary fast transport and is operated by the United States Navy's Military Sealift Command. It is the fourth ship in naval service named after Newport, Rhode Island.

On 20 February 2020, USNS Newport was launched at Austal USA in Mobile, Alabama. The Newport completed sea trials on 30 July 2020 and its delivery was accepted by the U.S. Navy on 2 September 2020.
