= USCGC Spencer (WMEC-905) =

United States Coast Guard cutter

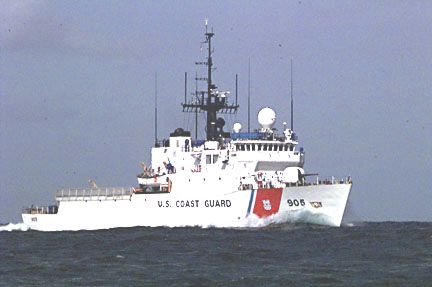
- USCGC Spencer (WMEC-905)

History

United States
- Builder: Derecktor Shipyards, Middletown, Rhode Island
- Laid down: 26 June 1982
- Launched: 17 April 1984
- Commissioned: 28 June 1986
- Home port: Portsmouth, Virginia
- Identification: MMSI number: 367258000; Callsign: NWHE
- Motto: Valor-Honor-Tradition
- Status: Active
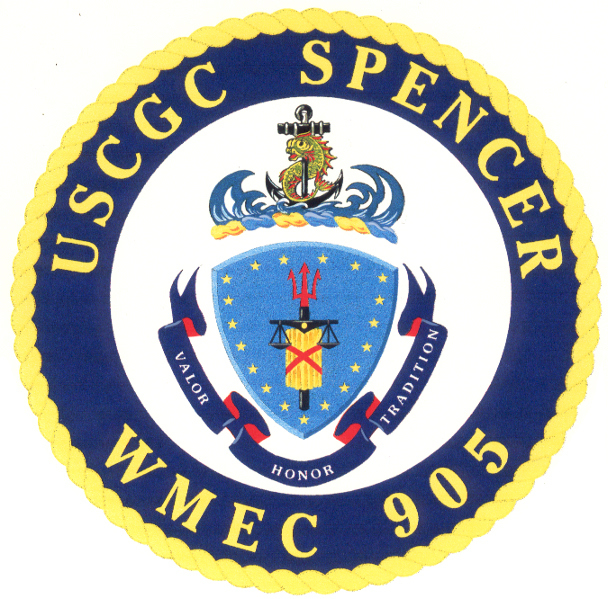
- Badge

General characteristics
- Displacement: 1,800 tons
- Length: 270 ft (82 m)
- Beam: 38 ft (12 m)
- Draft: 14.5 ft (4.4 m)
- Propulsion: Twin turbo-charged ALCO V-18 diesel engines
- Speed: 19.5 knots (36.1 km/h; 22.4 mph)
- Range: 9,900 nautical miles (18,300 km; 11,400 mi)
- Complement: 100 personnel (14 officers, 86 enlisted)
- Electronic warfare & decoys: AN/SLQ-32 (receive only)
- Armament: 1 OTO Melara Mk 75 76 mm/62 caliber naval gun; 2 × .50 caliber (12.7 mm) machine gun
- Aircraft carried: HH-65 Dolphin; HH-60 Jayhawk; MH-68 Stingray

USCGC Spencer (WMEC-905) is a United States Coast Guard medium endurance cutter. Her keel was laid on 26 June 1982 at Derecktor Shipyards, Middletown, Rhode Island. Named for John Canfield Spencer, United States Secretary of the Treasury from 1843 to 1844 under President John Tyler, she was and launched on 17 April 1984 and commissioned into service on 28 June 1986.

== Operational history ==
=== 1980s ===
During a law enforcement patrol in 1987, Spencer arrested 23 people and confiscated more than 46,000 pounds of marijuana from four smuggling vessels. While on a south patrol in 1989, Spencer rescued and repatriated 538 Haitian migrants bound for the United States, and later seized a Panamanian freighter laden with 438 kilograms of cocaine.

=== 1990s ===
In March 1991, Spencer towed a disabled U.S. Navy frigate, W.S. Sims, a ship twice Spencer's size, to safety. Spencer participated in the search for a missing Air National Guard pararescueman during the 1991 Perfect Storm. In June 1994, Spencer made the first planned deployment of a 270-foot cutter with an SH-60 helicopter. This ship/helicopter deployment was shortened so that Spencer could participate in the response to a mass exodus of Haitian migrants. Spencer was on-scene command for patrol boats recovering survivors and dead from the February 1993 sinking of the ferry Neptune in the Gulf of Gonave. The ship rescued over 1700 Haitian migrants during this patrol, 544 of whom were rescued on a single day on July 4, 1994. Two months later, Spencer repatriated more than 200 Haitian migrants from Guantanamo Bay, Cuba to Port-au-Prince, Haiti. During New York City's Annual Fleet Week of 1995, Spencer welcomed more than 5000 visitors. Spencer also carried several crew members from the Treasury Class high endurance cutter USCGC Spencer (WPG-36), which served during World War II, in honor of Fleet Week's celebration of the fiftieth anniversary of the end of that war. In early 1996, Spencer responded to the Alas Nacionales plane crash off the coastal waters of the Dominican Republic in which 188 people lost their lives. On April 22, 1997, Spencer seized 3905 pounds of cocaine off the coast of Honduras. When the fishing vessel Lady of Grace became disabled during a severe storm in November 1997, Spencer was there to save the crew and tow the vessel to safety. In 1999, Spencer was the on-scene command vessel for the EgyptAir Flight 990 crash off Nantucket, controlling both U.S. Navy and Coast Guard assets in the search and recovery efforts. Recently, Spencer worked with the French warship Ventôse, to seize 1800 kilograms of pure cocaine off the coast of Venezuela.

=== 2020s ===
On July 1, 2023 Spencer began a major overhaul at the Coast Guard Yard. The work was carried out under the Service Life Extension Program and is collectively referred to as the "SLEP". It is intended to increase the cutter's lifetime by up to ten years by replacing her obsolete equipment and by generally making her easier to maintain. In particular, Spencer's two 27-ton main diesel engines were replaced with new ALCO 251 engines; the two removed diesel engines were sent to Fairbanks Morse Defense for remanufacture and later reinstallation in sister ship USCGC Campbell during Campbell's SLEP. The other areas on which the SLEP concentrated were the cutter's weapons system, electrical system and hull. Spencer was scheduled to spend fifteen months in SLEP but in the event spent twenty months, leaving the Coast Guard Yard on March 8, 2025.
