= SSV Oliver Hazard Perry =

American tall ship

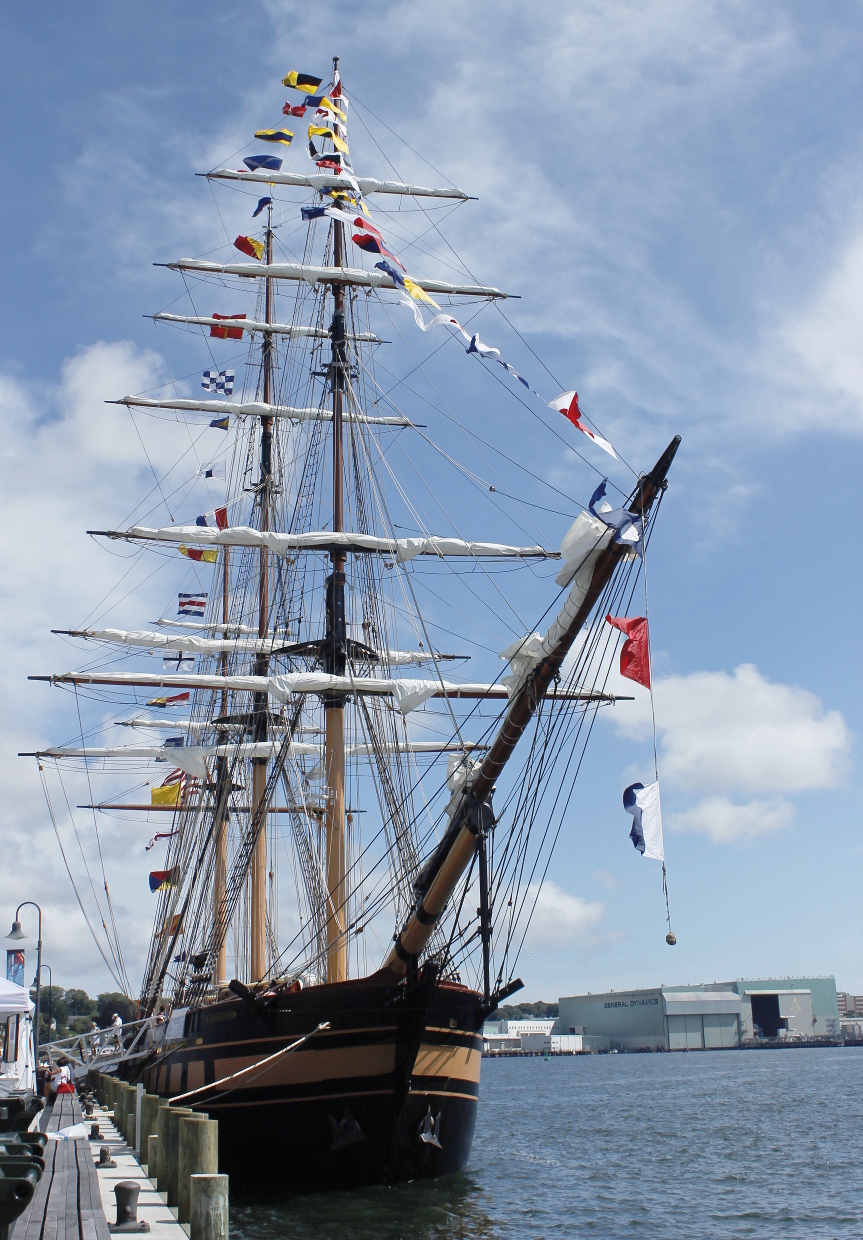
- The SSV Oliver Hazard Perry tall ship in New London, Connecticut, on Sept. 9, 2015.

History

United States
- Name: Oliver Hazard Perry
- Namesake: Oliver Hazard Perry
- Owner: Oliver Hazard Perry Rhode Island
- Operator: Oliver Hazard Perry Rhode Island
- Builder: Senesco Marine, North Kingstown, Rhode Island
- Maiden voyage: 16 July 2015
- Homeport: Newport, RI, USA
- Identification: IMO number: 8775560; MMSI number: 367658110; Callsign: KOHZ
- Nickname(s): The Perry
- Status: As of July 2015 underway

General characteristics
- Class & type: Sail Training Vessel
- Type: Tall ship
- Tonnage: 471
- Displacement: 550
- Length: 196 ft (60 m) sparred; 132 ft (40 m) o/a
- Beam: 38 ft
- Height: 130 ft
- Draft: 13 ft
- Decks: steel, wood overlay anticipated
- Installed power: 2 Deere 99kW gensets, CAT 30 kW emergency genset.
- Propulsion: 2 CAT C12 385 hp each
- Sail plan: Full-rigged ship; 14,000 sq ft (1,300 m^{2}) sail area
- Complement: 49
- Crew: 17

SSV Oliver Hazard Perry is a tall ship operated by Oliver Hazard Perry Rhode Island (OHPRI), a grass-roots nonprofit based in Newport, Rhode Island. The ship is named after American Commodore Oliver Hazard Perry (1785–1819), the hero of the naval Battle of Lake Erie (1813).

== Description ==
The SSV Oliver Hazard Perry measures 207 feet (63 m), and is a three-masted square-rigged vessel, making it the largest privately owned tall ship and largest civilian sail training vessel in the United States. The Oliver Hazard Perry sails as Rhode Island’s Official Sailing School Vessel and "good will ambassador" for the state, as well as a "floating classroom". It teaches students STEAM (Science, Technology, Engineering, Arts and Mathematics) lessons while applying it to the practical activities they learn how to do on the ship. It is being financed through a tax exempt 501(c)(3) charitable foundation, and public subscription.

The ship, when acquired by the Rhode Island trust for $325,000, was a 138 feet (42 m) steel hull, built by an organization in Ontario. It had cost $750,000 to build the bare hull. However the Canadian group was eroded by negative press before the ship could be completed. The Rhode Islanders were approached and offered the uncompleted vessel. The Canadians had intended it to be a replica of the 20-gun British ship HMS Detroit (1813) (captured by the flotilla commanded by Commodore Perry; not the six gun sloop HMS Detroit (1816) destroyed by Lieutenant Jesse D. Elliott in the War of 1812).

On July 16, 2015, the Perry set sail for the first time on a voyage to Portland, ME. During that voyage it made a stop in Provincetown, MA. While in Maine the Perry participated in the parade of sail during the 2015 Portland Tall Ships festival. The ship also made a visit to New London, CT, for the 2015 Connecticut Maritime Heritage Festival.

On October 15, 2017, the ship lost power while leaving the Newport, RI seafood festival. It drifted into several boats and sat grounded overnight in Newport Harbor. An on scene eye witness said power was not lost till grounding (sucking mud). What was lost was control in high wind. After repairs were made, the ship set sail again, fulfilling its mission as an educational vessel, hosting students from high schools, the United States Naval Sea Cadet Corps (USNSCC), and the Naval Academy Prep School.
