= HMCS Moncton (MM 708) =

Royal Canadian Navy coastal defence vessel

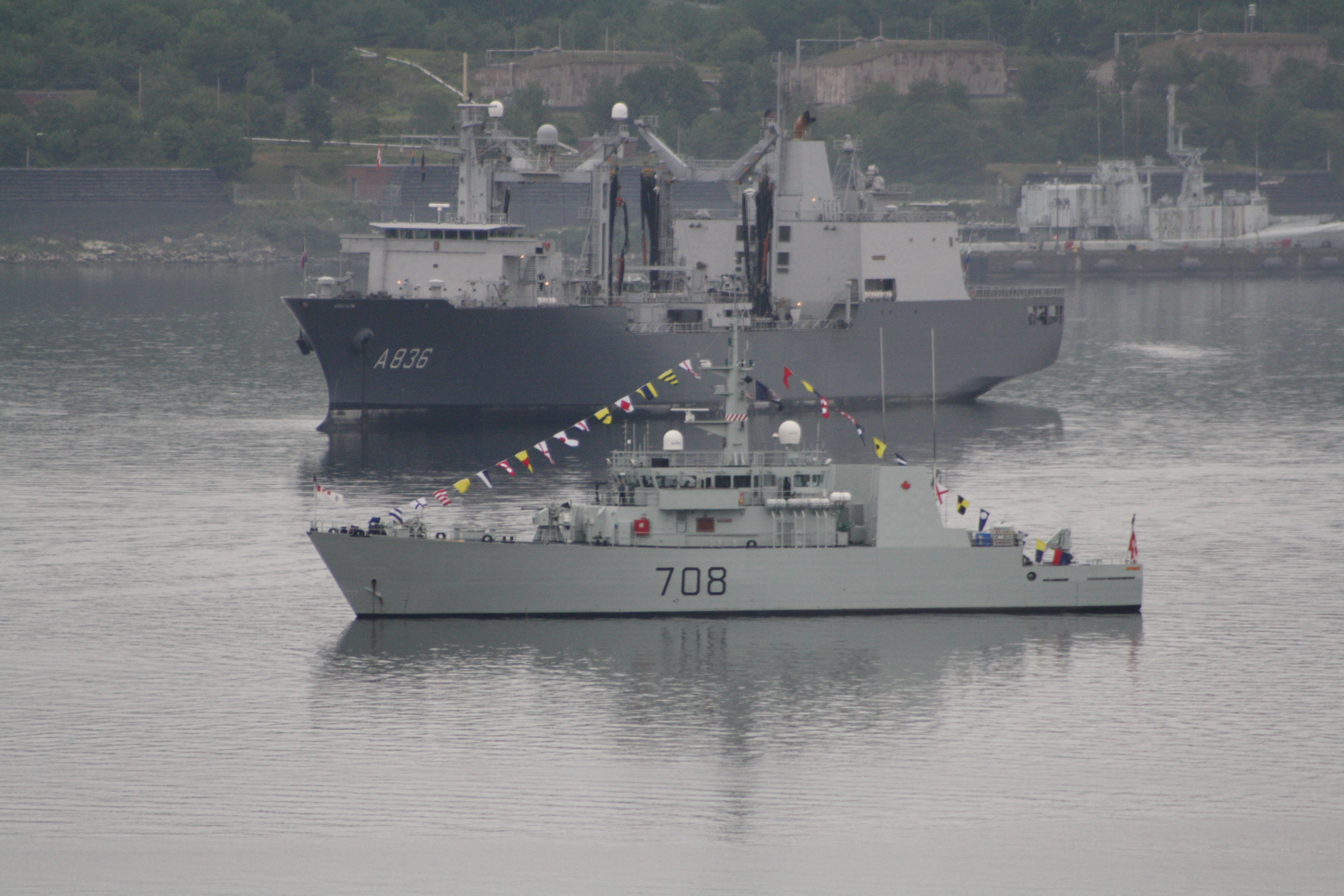
- HMCS Moncton in Bedford Basin as part of International Fleet Review 2010

History

Canada
- Name: Moncton
- Namesake: Moncton, New Brunswick
- Builder: Halifax Shipyards Ltd., Halifax, Nova Scotia
- Laid down: 31 May 1997
- Launched: 5 December 1997
- Commissioned: 12 July 1998
- Home port: CFB Halifax
- Identification: MMSI number: 316294000; Callsign: CGJC; Pennant number: MM 708
- Honours and awards: Atlantic, 1942–43
- Status: in active service

General characteristics
- Class & type: Kingston-class coastal defence vessel
- Displacement: 970 long tons (986 t)
- Length: 55.3 m (181 ft 5 in)
- Beam: 11.3 m (37 ft 1 in)
- Draught: 3.4 m (11 ft 2 in)
- Propulsion: 4 × Jeumont ANR-53-50 alternators, 4 × 600VAC Wärtsilä UD 23V12 diesel engines, 7.2 MW (9,700 hp); 2 × Jeumont CI 560L motors, 3,000 hp (2,200 kW); 2 × LIPS Z drive azimuth thrusters
- Speed: 15 knots (28 km/h; 17 mph)
- Range: 5,000 nmi (9,300 km; 5,800 mi) at 8 kn (15 km/h; 9.2 mph)
- Complement: 37
- Sensors & processing systems: Kelvin Hughes navigation radar (I-band); Kelvin Hughes 6000 surface search radar (E-F band); Global Positioning System; AN/SQS-511 towed side scan sonar; Remote-control Mine Hunting System (RMHS)
- Armament: 1 × Bofors 40 mm/60 Mk 5C gun (removed from the class); 2 × M2 machine guns

HMCS Moncton is a Kingston-class coastal defence vessel that has served in the Canadian Forces since 1998. Moncton is the ninth ship of her class. She is the second vessel to use the designation HMCS Moncton. The ship is assigned to Maritime Forces Atlantic (MARLANT) and is homeported at CFB Halifax.

== Design and description ==
The Kingston class was designed to fill the minesweeper, coastal patrol and reserve training needs of the Canadian Forces, replacing the Bay-class minesweepers, Porte-class gate vessels and Royal Canadian Mounted Police coastal launches in those roles. In order to perform these varied duties the Kingston-class vessels are designed to carry up to three 6.1-metre (20 ft) ISO containers with power hookups on the open deck aft in order to embark mission-specific payloads. The seven module types available for embarkation include four route survey, two mechanical minesweeping and one bottom inspection modules.

The Kingston class displace 970 long tons (986 t) and are 55.3 metres (181 ft 5 in) long overall with a beam 11.3 metres (37 ft 1 in) and a draught of 3.4 metres (11 ft 2 in). The coastal defence vessels are powered by four Jeumont ANR-53-50 alternators coupled to four Wärtsilä UD 23V12 diesel engines creating 7.2 megawatts (9,700 hp). Two LIPS Z-drive azimuth thrusters are driven by two Jeumont CI 560L motors creating 3,000 horsepower (2,200 kW) and the Z drives can be rotated 360°. This gives the ships a maximum speed of 15 knots (28 km/h; 17 mph) and a range of 5,000 nautical miles (9,300 km; 5,800 mi) at 8 knots (15 km/h; 9.2 mph).

The Kingston class is equipped with a Kelvin Hughes navigational radar using the I band and a Kelvin Hughes 6000 surface search radar scanning the E and F bands. The vessels carry an AN/SQS-511 towed side scan sonar for minesweeping and a Remote-control Mine Hunting System (RMHS). The vessels are equipped with one Bofors 40 mm/60 calibre Mk 5C gun and two M2 machine guns. (Note: The 60 calibre denotes the length of the gun. This means that the length of the gun barrel is 60 times the bore diameter.) The 40 mm gun was declared obsolete and removed from the vessels in 2014. Some of them ended up as museum pieces and on display at naval reserve installations across Canada. The Kingston-class coastal defence vessels have a complement of 37.

== Service history ==
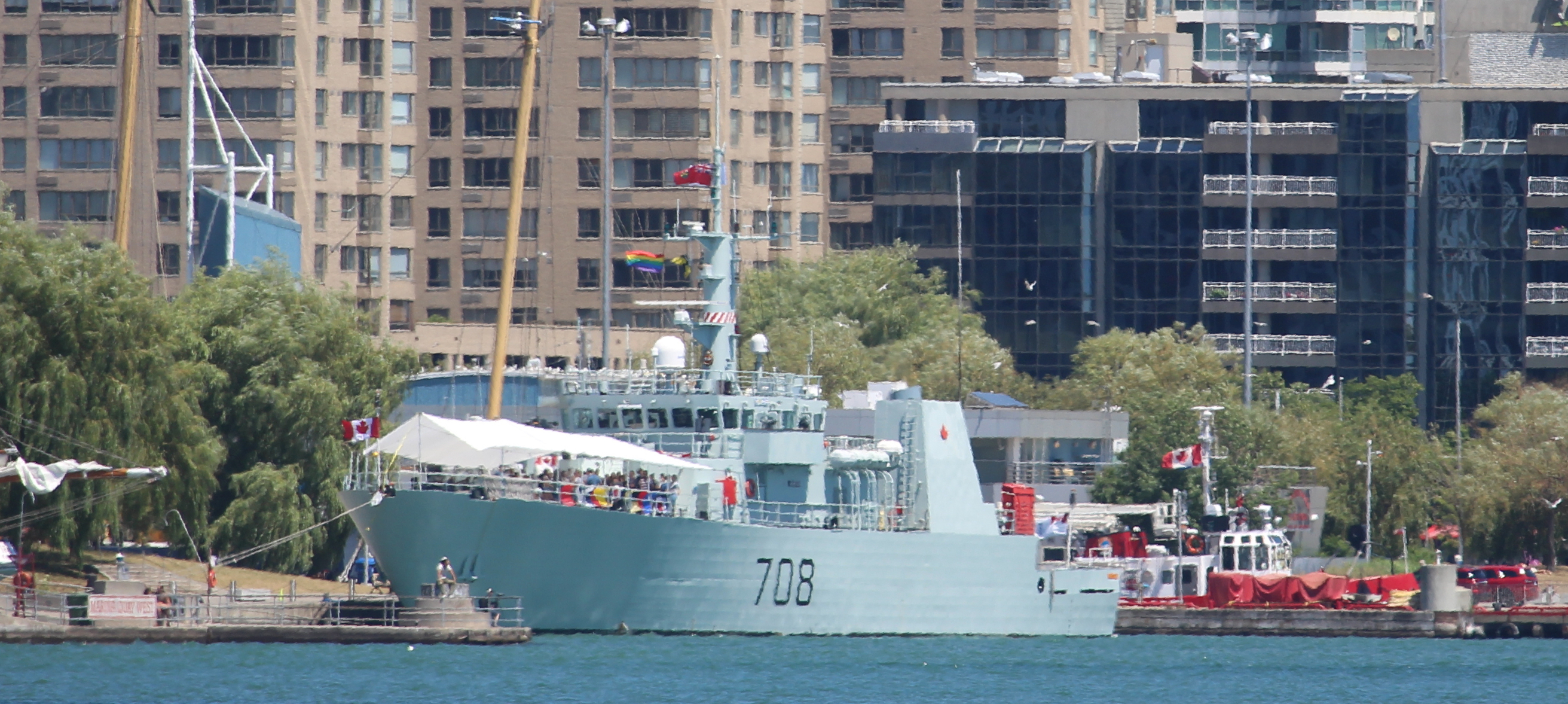
HMCS Moncton docked in Toronto as part of the Great Lakes Tour of 2018

Moncton was laid down on 31 May 1997 at Halifax Shipyards Ltd., Halifax, Nova Scotia and was launched on 5 December 1997. The ship was commissioned into the Canadian Forces on 12 July 1998 at Pointe-du-Chêne, New Brunswick and carries the classification MM 708.

In September 1998, Moncton was among the Canadian Forces ships that deployed off the coast of Nova Scotia after the crash of Swissair Flight 111. In 2000, the coastal defence vessel took part in the naval exercise Unified Spirit off the east coast and in 2001, sailed to participate in the NATO naval exercise Blue Game off Denmark and Norway with sister ship Goose Bay.

In August 2011, Moncton deployed to the Arctic Ocean as part of Operation Nanook. In February 2015, Moncton deployed to the Caribbean Sea as part of Operation Caribbe, Canada's contribution to the war on drugs.

In January 2016, Moncton, alongside sister ship Summerside, sailed for the Caribbean to take part in Operation Caribbe. In August, the ship sailed with Shawinigan to the Arctic to take part in Operation Nanook. During the operation, the ship visited Churchill, Manitoba and patrolled Hudson Bay. Shawinigan and Moncton returned to Halifax on 30 September. In February 2017, Summerside and Moncton deployed to the coast of West Africa in the Gulf of Guinea as part of the naval exercise Neptune Trident. The two ships conducted missions against pirates and illegal fishing, along with making port visits to Sierra Leone, Senegal, Liberia and Ivory Coast. During the deployment, Moncton took part in a joint training exercise with the Liberian Coast Guard. Summerside and Moncton returned to Halifax on 2 May after two-month deployment to West Africa. In November, Moncton was in the Caribbean to take part in Operation Caribbe. On 11 November, Moncton intercepted a suspect vessel, and her embarked United States Coast Guard LEDET unit boarded the vessel, seizing 834 kg (1,839 lb) of illegal cocaine.

From July through August 2018, Moncton deployed to the St. Lawrence River and the Great Lakes, visiting several Canadian ports. In October 2018, Moncton was among the Canadian ships deployed to the North Atlantic and Baltic Sea as part of the large NATO exercise, Trident Juncture. In September 2019, Moncton received a regularly scheduled refit at the Shelburne Ship Repair yard. The ship was given a special commemorative Second World War dazzle camouflage paint scheme to mark the 75th anniversary of the end of the Battle of the Atlantic. Regina on Canada's West Coast was given a similar commemorative pattern in October 2019. The pattern chosen was the 1944 "Admiralty Disruptive D-Day" dazzle pattern, designed to confuse enemy shore batteries during the D-Day landings.

In January 2023, Moncton and sister ship Glace Bay sailed from Halifax for operations off West Africa in the Gulf of Guinea, participating in several exercises and diplomatic engagements in the area. However, with the situation in Haiti worsening, the Canadian government redeployed the two ships to the seas off that nation's capital Port-au-Prince for patrols in February.

HMCS Moncton is scheduled to decommission in 2028.
