= BRP Valentin Diaz =

Philippine Navy corvette

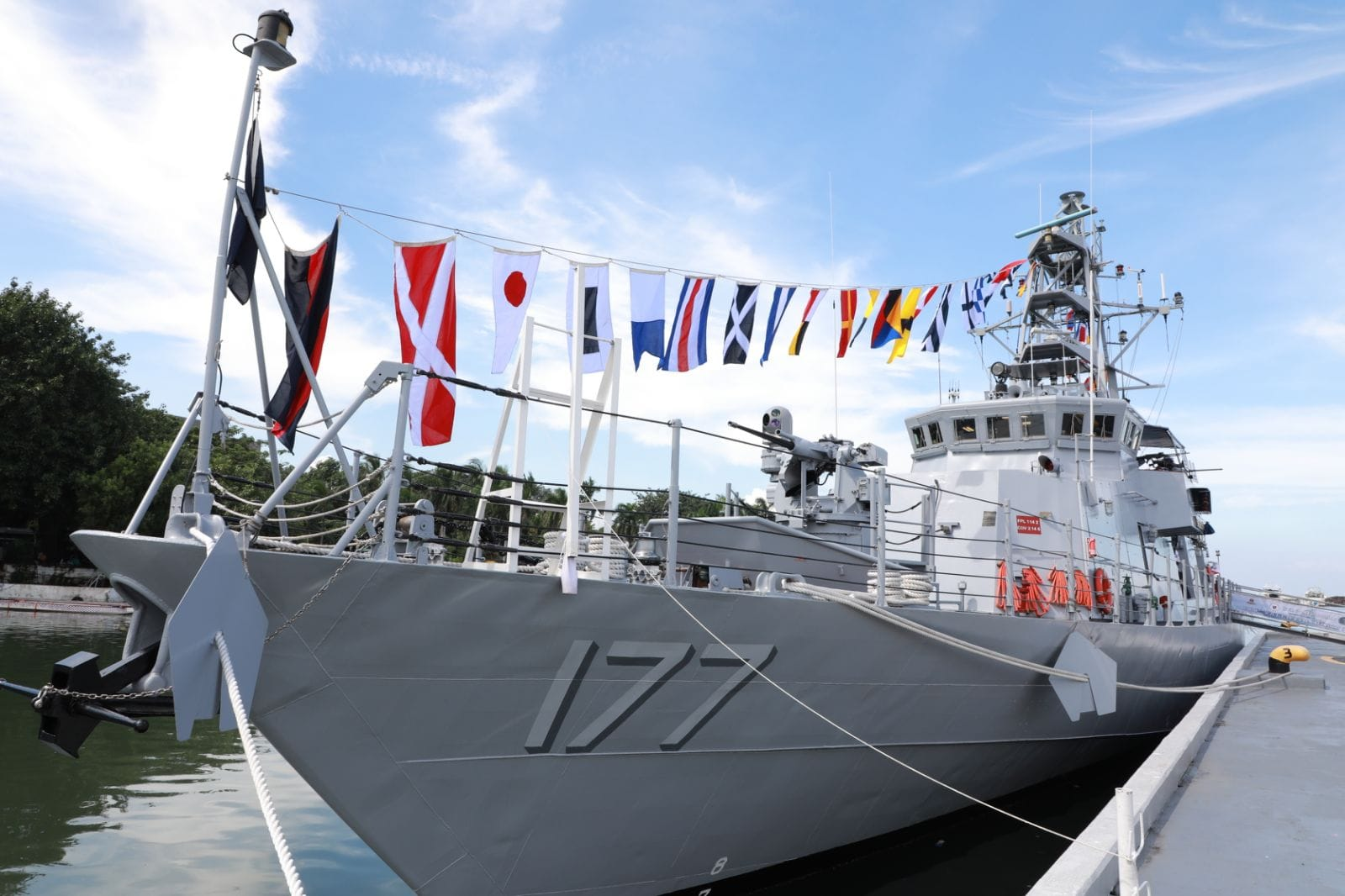
- BRP Valentin Diaz (PS-177) during its commissioning with the Philippine Navy.

History

United States of America
- Name: USS Monsoon
- Builder: Bollinger Shipyards, Lockport, Louisiana
- Laid down: 15 February 1992
- Launched: 10 October 1992
- Acquired: 20 September 1993
- Commissioned: 22 January 1994
- Recommissioned: 22 August 2008
- Decommissioned: 01 October 2004, 28 March 2023
- Identification: PC-4
- Fate: Transferred to Philippine Navy
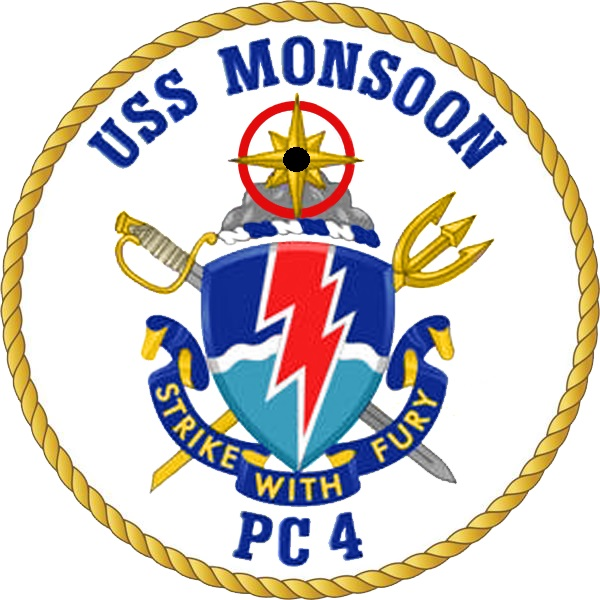
- Badge

History

United States of America
- Name: USCGC Monsoon
- Commissioned: 01 October 2004
- Decommissioned: 22 August 2008
- Identification: WPC-4
- Fate: Returned to the US Navy

Philippines
- Name: BRP Valentin Diaz
- Namesake: Valentín Díaz y Villanueva
- Acquired: 28 March 2023
- Commissioned: 11 September 2023
- Identification: PS-177
- Motto: Seek. Strike. Prevail.
- Status: In service
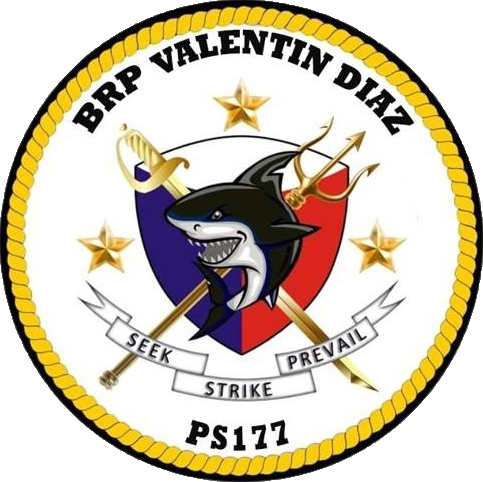
- Badge

General characteristics
- Class & type: Alvarez-class patrol ship
- Displacement: 331 tons
- Length: 174 ft (53 m)
- Beam: 25 ft (7.6 m)
- Draft: 7.5 ft (2.3 m)
- Installed power: 2 × MTU 6V396 TC52 diesel generators
- Propulsion: 4 × Paxman Valenta 16RP200CM diesel engines producing combined total of 13,400 shp (9,990 kW) sustained
- Speed: 35 knots (65 km/h) maximum
- Range: 2,900 mi (2,500 nmi; 4,700 km)at 12 knots (22 km/h; 14 mph)
- Endurance: 10 days
- Boats & landing craft carried: 1 × 7-meter RHIB
- Crew: 4 officers, 24 men, 8 Special Forces
- Sensors & processing systems: AN/SPS-64(V)9 I-band Surface Search Radar; Sperry Vision RASCAR 2100M Combat System; Sperry Vision RASCAR 3400C X-band Navigation/Surface Search Radar; Sperry Vision RASCAR 3400C S-band Navigation/Surface Search Radar; Wesmar side-scanning hull-mounted Sonar; FLIR Systems AN/KAX-1 MarFLIR
- Electronic warfare & decoys: Privateer AN/APR-39(V)1 ESM radar warning; 2 × Mk.52 Mod.0 sextuple Chaff Launchers
- Armament: 2 × Mk.38 Mod.2 Bushmaster 25 mm chain guns; 3 × M2HG Browning 12.7 mm 50 caliber machine guns; 2 × M240 7.62 mm machine gun

BRP Valentin Diaz (PS-177) is an Alvarez-class patrol ship of the Philippine Navy. She is the Philippine Navy's second ship of the class and was a Cyclone-class patrol ship previously named USS Monsoon (PC-4) during her service with the US Navy and USCGC Monsoon during her service with the US Coast Guard.

== History ==
=== US Navy and US Coast Guard ===
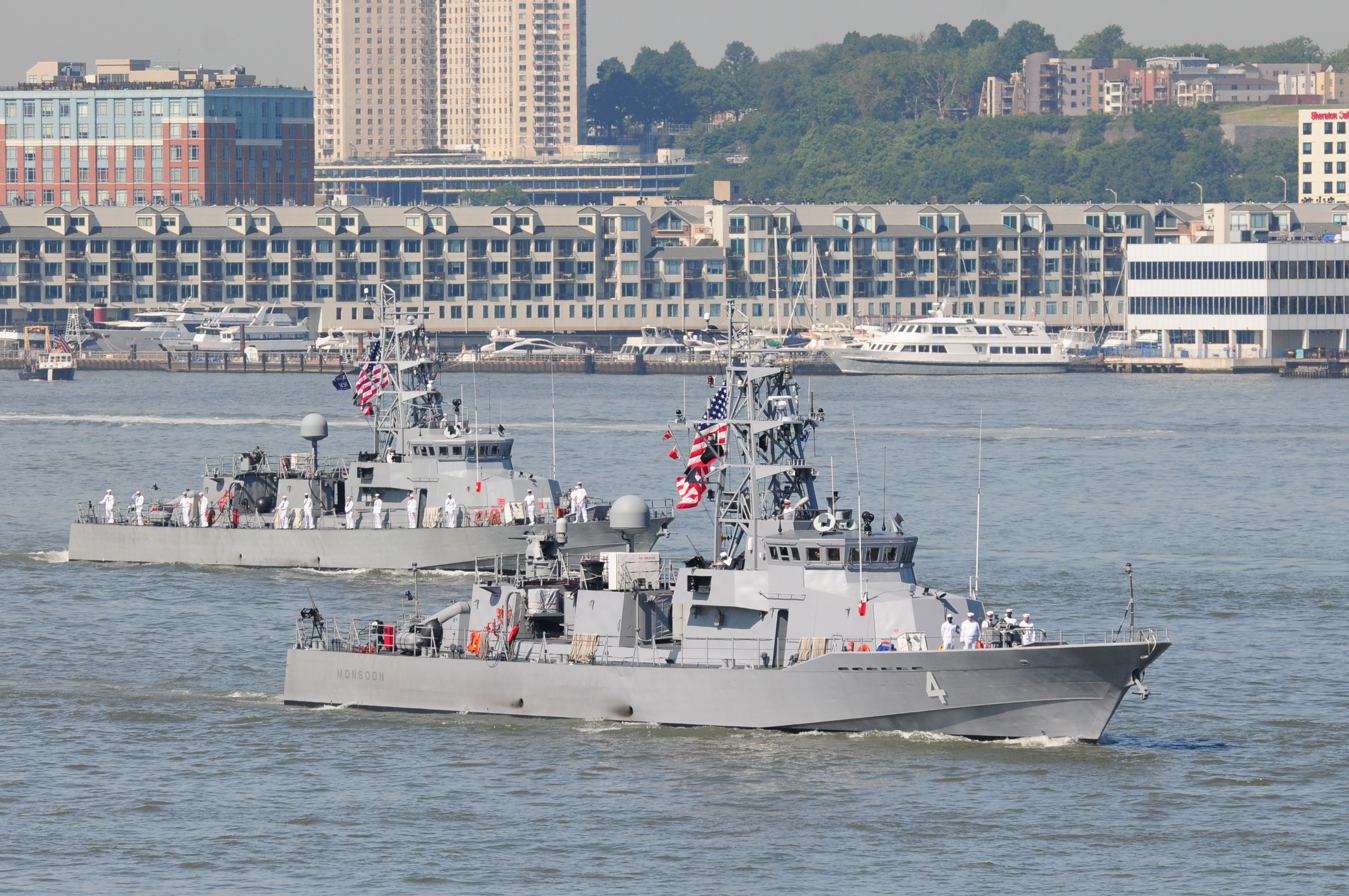
USS Monsoon (PC-4) sailing up the Hudson River in May 2010.

Launched as the fourth of fourteen ships of the Cyclone-class patrol ship, the primary mission of USS Monsoon (PC-4) was to serve as a platform for conducting maritime special operations, including interdiction, escort, noncombatant evacuation, reconnaissance, operational deception, intelligence collection, and tactical swimmer operations. Her small size, stealthy construction and high speed were tailored to performing long-range Special Operations Forces (SOF) insertion and extraction as well as other SOF support duties as needed.

As good a design as it is, Monsoon had barely gone into service in the mid-1990s when the Special Operations Command rejected them as too big for commando missions, and the regular surface Navy dismissed them as too small for any of its missions. The Navy began looking for ways to phase out Monsoon and her sister ships, so on 1 October 2004, Monsoon was decommissioned.

She was then loaned and transferred to the United States Coast Guard, being re-commissioned as USCGC Monsoon (WPC-4). The ships that were on loan to the U.S. Coast Guard were used in a variety of roles, including search and rescue, interception, boarding, and inspection of foreign freighters arriving at United States ports.

As a U.S. Coast Guard cutter, Monsoon, along with USCGC Boutwell helped with the arrest of Mexican drug kingpin Francisco Javier Arellano Félix in 2006 while he was deep-sea fishing off the Baja Peninsula. The crew of Monsoon took him into custody and his U.S. registered fishing boat, Dock Holiday, was towed back to San Diego from international waters by a Coast Guard patrol boat.

She was returned to the U.S. Navy on 22 August 2008, and was re-commissioned. As of 2015, ten of the U.S. Navy's 13 Cyclone-class patrol ships including Monsoon were deployed to Naval Support Activity Bahrain in the Persian Gulf, to deal with a potential conflict with Iran. The remaining three ships of the class are slated to be transferred to Naval Station Mayport in Florida to primarily perform drug interdiction duties with U.S. Naval Forces Southern Command (USNAVSO) / U.S. Fourth Fleet.

Monsoon together with sistership Chinook were decommissioned again from the US Navy on 28 March 2023, and were transferred to the Philippine Navy on the same day.

=== Philippine Navy ===
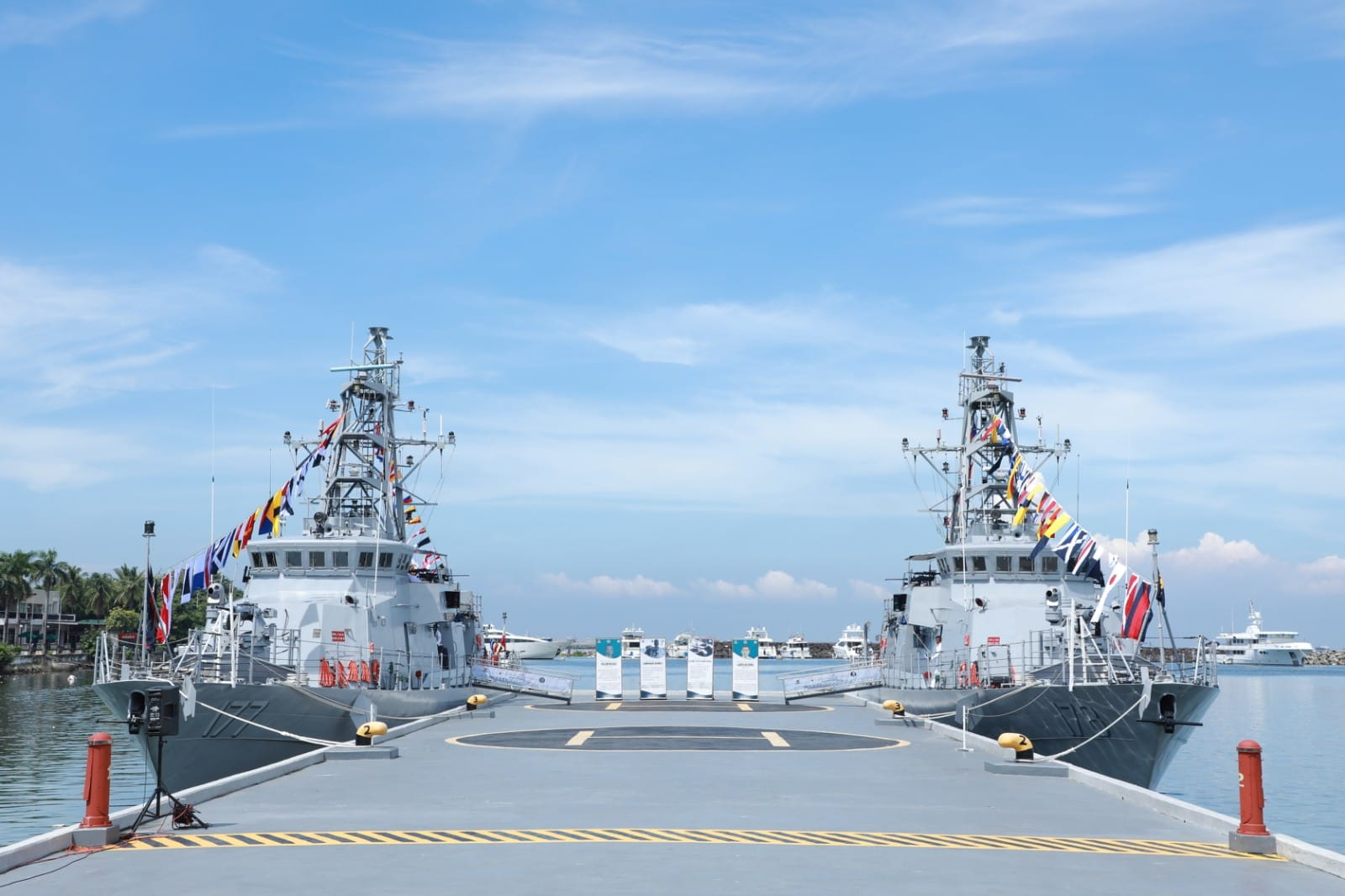
The BRP Valentin Diaz (PS-177) and BRP Ladislao Diwa (PS-178) during their commissioning with the Philippine Navy.

She was rechristened as BRP Valentin Diaz (PS-177) on 11 September 2023, in honor of a Filipino revolutionary in its war of independence from Spanish colonial rule. She is currently assigned to the Littoral Combat Force of the Philippine Fleet.

The ship is the first ever Philippine Navy ship to use the name.

On 7 April 2024, Valentin Diaz conducted a joint patrol in the South China Sea with BRP Antonio Luna, BRP Gregorio del Pilar, USS Mobile of the US Navy, HMAS Warramunga of the Royal Australian Navy, and JS Akebono of the Japan Maritime Self-Defense Force. This marked the first multinational patrol between the nations.

== See also ==
- List of ships of the Philippine Navy
