= USS Monsoon =

1992 Cyclone-class patrol ship

USS Monsoon (PC-4)
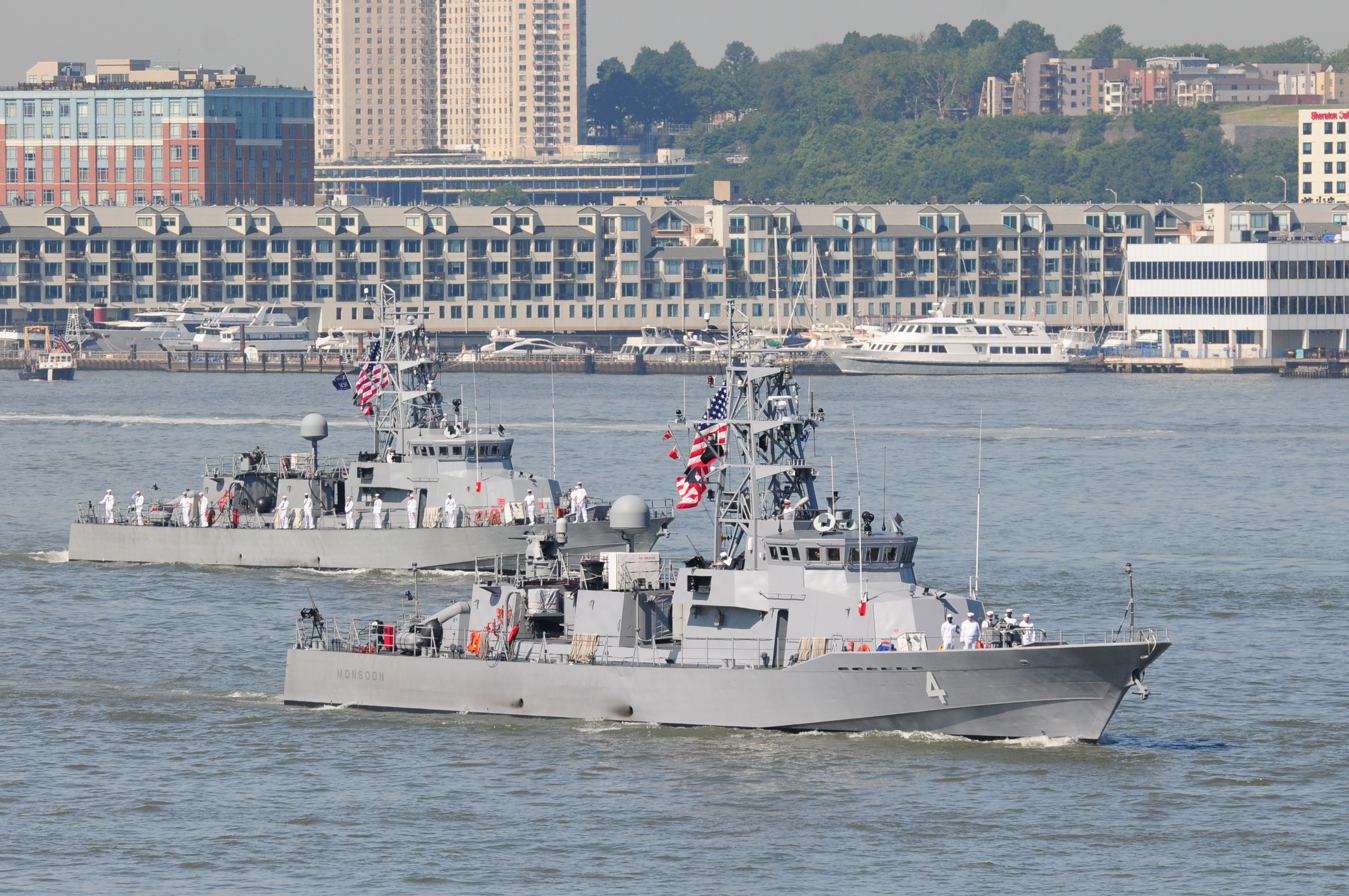
- USS Monsoon (foreground) sailing up the Hudson River in May 2010, alongside her sister ship USS Tempest (background).

History

→ United States
- Name: USS Monsoon (PC-4); USCGC Monsoon (WPC-4)
- Namesake: Monsoon
- Ordered: 3 August 1990
- Builder: Bollinger Shipyards, Lockport, Louisiana
- Laid down: 15 February 1992
- Launched: 10 October 1992
- Acquired: 20 September 1993
- Commissioned: 22 January 1994
- Decommissioned: 28 March 2023
- Home port: Manama, Bahrain
- Motto: Strike with fury.
- Fate: Transferred to the Philippines Navy
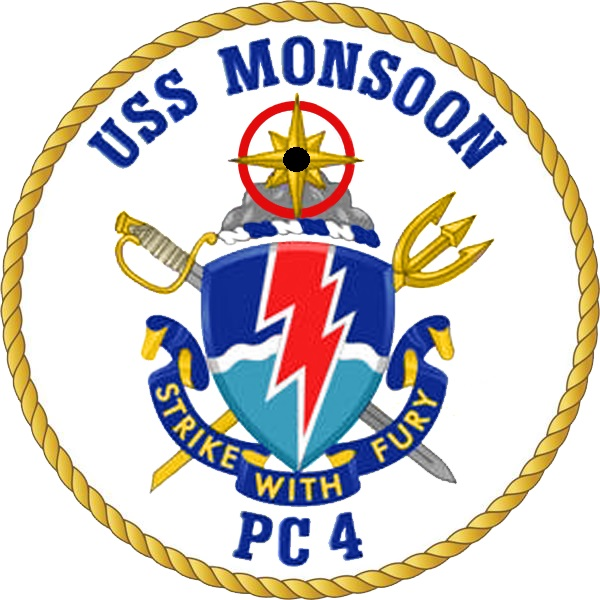
- Badge

General characteristics
- Class & type: Cyclone-class patrol ship
- Displacement: 331 tons
- Length: 174 ft (53 m)
- Beam: 25 ft (7.6 m)
- Draft: 7.5 ft (2.3 m)
- Propulsion: 4 Paxman Vallenta 1600 MPDE
- Speed: 35 knots (65 km/h; 40 mph)
- Boats & landing craft carried: 7m RHIB
- Complement: 4 officers, 24 men, 8 Special Forces
- Armament: (USN) 2 M242 Bushmaster MK38 Mod 2 chain guns; 2 Mk19 grenade launchers; 2 .50 (12.7 mm) machine guns; 8 AGM-176 Griffins

USS Monsoon (PC-4) was the fourth Cyclone-class patrol ship. Monsoon was laid down by Bollinger Shipyards, Lockport, Louisiana on 15 February 1992 and launched 10 October 1992. She was commissioned 22 January 1994 by the United States Navy. She was decommissioned 1 October 2004 and loaned to the United States Coast Guard as USCGC Monsoon (WPC-4). She was returned to the U.S. Navy on 22 August 2008, and decommissioned again on 28 March 2023.

== History ==
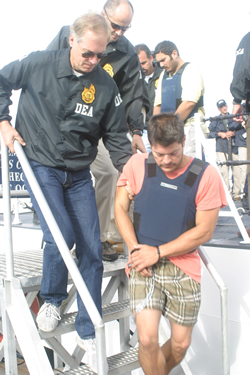
Francisco Javier Arellano Felix escorted off USCGC Monsoon by DEA agents

=== U.S. Coast Guard ===
During her time as a U.S. Coast Guard cutter, Monsoon, along with USCGC Boutwell helped with the arrest of Mexican drug kingpin Francisco Javier Arellano Félix in 2006 while he was deep-sea fishing off the Baja Peninsula. The crew of Monsoon took him into custody and his U.S. registered fishing boat, Dock Holiday, was towed back to San Diego from international waters by a Coast Guard patrol boat.

USS Monsoon together with sistership USS Chinook were decommissioned from the US Navy on 28 March 2023, and were transferred to the Philippine Navy on the same day. Monsoon was renamed BRP Valentin Diaz.

== Notes ==
Citations

References used

- Alfano, Sean (16 August 2006). "Feds Land A Big Fish". CBS News.
