= BRP Antonio Luna =

Philippine Navy frigate

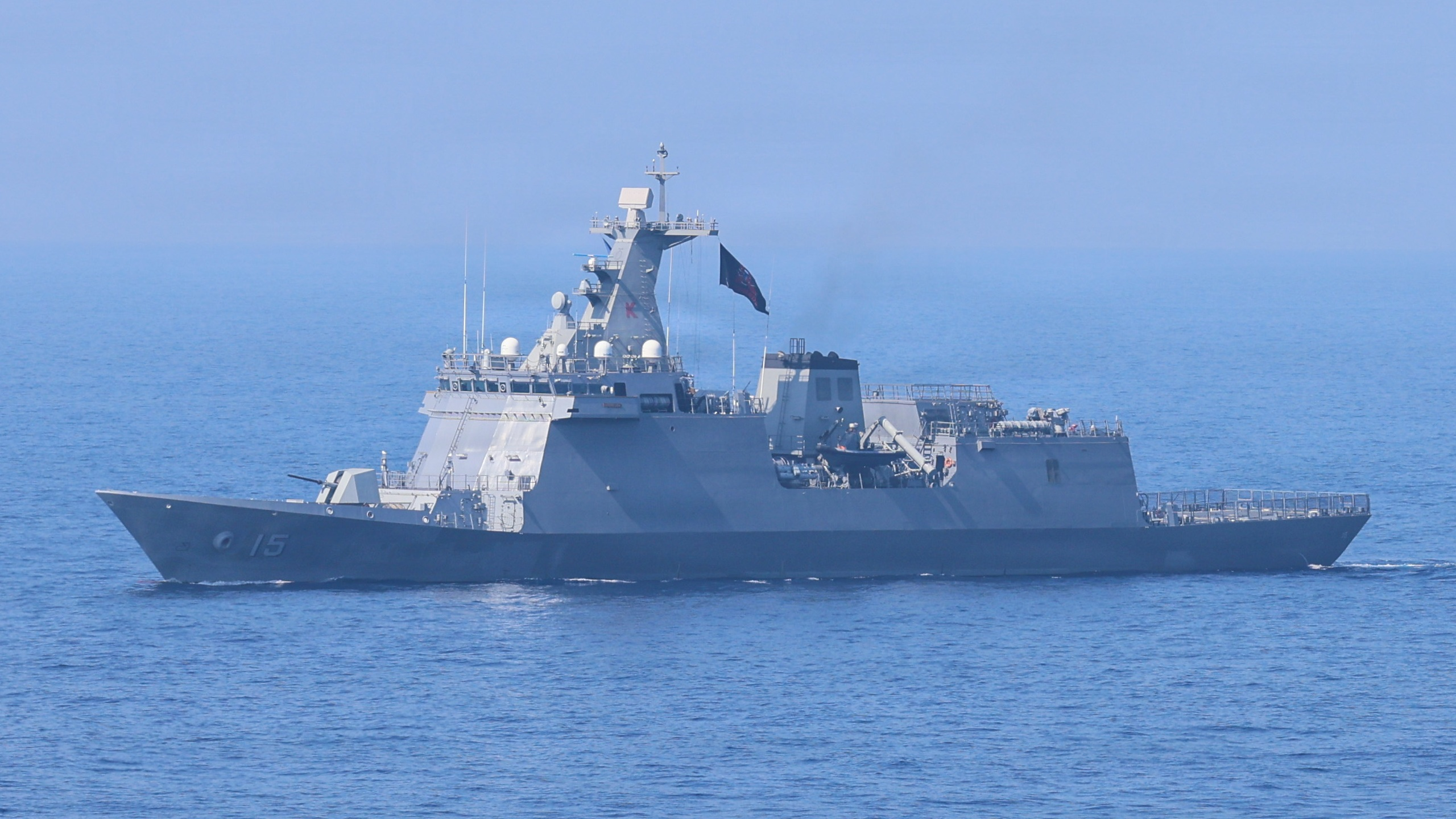
- BRP Antonio Luna (FFG15) sailing during the group sail phase of the Exercise Balikatan 2026.

Philippines
- Name: BRP Antonio Luna
- Namesake: Antonio Narciso Luna de San Pedro y Novicio Ancheta
- Ordered: 24 October 2016
- Builder: Hyundai Heavy Industries
- Cost: ₱7.872B (FY2016) excluding munitions
- Laid down: 23 May 2019
- Launched: 8 November 2019
- Commissioned: 19 March 2021
- Identification: FFG15
- Status: Active
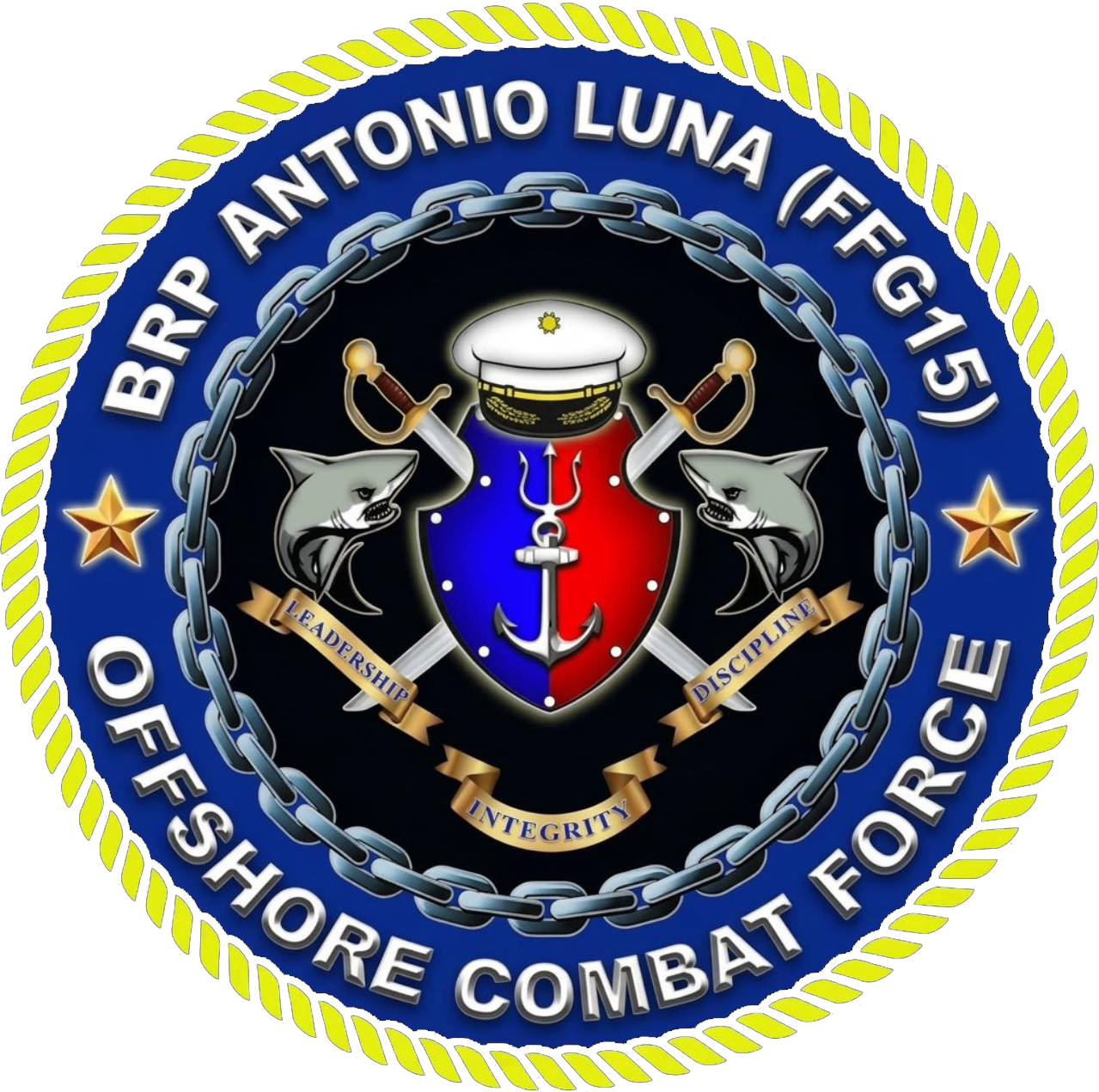
- Badge

General characteristics
- Class & type: Jose Rizal-class frigate
- Displacement: 2,600 tonnes
- Length: 107 m (351 ft 1 in)
- Beam: 13.8 m (45 ft 3 in)
- Draft: 3.65 m (12 ft 0 in)
- Depth: 6.9 m (22 ft 8 in)
- Installed power: 4 × MTU-STX 12V2000-M41B diesel generators, each producing around 650 kW (872 shp)
- Propulsion: Combined diesel and diesel (CODAD) arrangement: 4 × MTU-STX 12V1163-TB93 12-cylinder diesel engines
- Speed: 25 knots (46 km/h; 29 mph)
- Range: 4,500 nmi (8,300 km; 5,200 mi)
- Endurance: 30 days
- Boats & landing craft carried: 2 × RHIB
- Complement: Accommodation for 110 persons: Crew: 65; Non-organic: 25; Additional personnel: 20
- Sensors & processing systems: Combat systems: Hanwha Systems Naval Shield Baseline 2 Integrated CMS; Search radar: Hensoldt TRS-3D Baseline D multi-mode phased array C-band radar; Navigation radar: Kelvin Hughes SharpEye I-band & E/F-band radars; Fire control radar: Selex ES NA-25X fire control radar; Electro-Optical Tracking System: Safran PASEO NS electro-optical; Tactical Data Link: Hanwha Systems Link P (Link K Derivative); Link 16 LOS datalink (planned); Link 22 BLOS datalink (planned); Sonar: Harris Model 997 medium frequency active/passive hull mounted sonar; Thales CAPTAS-2 towed array sonar (planned)
- Electronic warfare & decoys: RESM: Elbit Systems Elisra NS9003A; Countermeasures: 2 × Terma C-Guard DL-6T decoy launchers
- Armament: Missiles; 4 × C-Star SSM-710K anti-ship cruise missiles in two slanted twin-canisters; 2 × Simbad-RC twin-Mistral missile launchers; 8-cell vertical launching system with a height of 5.2 meters (FFBNW); Torpedoes; 2 × SEA triple-tube torpedo launching systems; K745 Blue Shark torpedoes; Guns; 1 × OTO Melara 76/62SR dual-purpose rapid-fire autocannon; 1 × Aselsan SMASH 30 mm remote weapon station autocannon; 4 × K6 12.7 mm/50 cal. heavy machine guns; 1 × Close-in weapon system (FFBNW)
- Aircraft carried: 1 × AW159 Wildcat naval helicopter
- Aviation facilities: Flight deck: 12 t helicopter; Enclosed hangar: 10 t helicopter

BRP Antonio Luna (FFG15) is the second ship of the Jose Rizal class of guided missile frigates in service with the Philippine Navy. She is able to conduct multi-role operations such anti-surface warfare (ASUW), anti-submarine warfare (ASW), and limited anti-air warfare (AAW). She is one of the service's primary warships until the introduction of new and more powerful contemporaries.

== Construction and design ==
The BRP Antonio Luna was designed and built by Hyundai Heavy Industries (HHI) of South Korea, and is based on the shipbuilder's HDF-2600 design, which in turn was derived from the Incheon-class frigate of the Republic of Korea Navy (ROK Navy). Changes were made on the base design by making use of design developments and features found on newer frigates of the ROK Navy, considering reduced radar cross-section by having cleaner lines, smooth surface design, reduced overhangs and a low freeboard.

On September 17, 2018, the steel cutting ceremony was held for P160 (project number of second of two frigates) at HHI shipyard at the Shin Hwa Tech facility in Pohang City, South Korea, marking the first step of the ship's construction journey. On December 20, Lorenzana announced at a press conference the names of the two future frigates being built by HHI: BRP Jose Rizal and BRP Antonio Luna.

On May 23, 2019, HHI held the keel laying ceremony for P160 at HHI shipyard, marking the formal start of the construction of the ship. In the press briefing the same day, a Hanwha official said that Link 16 will likely not be compatible for the frigates until 2020 because of issues between US and South Korea. On November 8, HHI launched the second ship, the prospective BRP Antonio Luna, at Ulsan shipyard in South Korea.

The ship's outfitting, sea trials and delivery were affected by restrictions due to the COVID-19 pandemic. HHI conducted sea trials to test the ship's seaworthiness, propulsion, communications, weapons and sensor systems.

On December 18, 2020, the Philippine Navy's Technical Inspection and Acceptance Committee declared that the ship is compliant with the agreed technical specifications after witnessing its sea trials. This paved way for the frigate re-docking and final outfitting before delivery.

On January 29, 2021, the prospective BRP Antonio Luna (FF-151) was approved for delivery and acceptance by a joint Department of National Defense and Philippine Navy inspection team. On February 9, the ship was met by BRP Jose Rizal in the vicinity of Capones Island, Zambales after leaving South Korea four days ago. This was complemented by a fly-by of three FA-50 light fighter jets from the Philippine Air Force. On March 19, the ship was officially commissioned as BRP Antonio Luna (FF-151). The ceremony happened at 8 o`clock in the morning at Pier 13, South Harbor, Manila. It was attended by Philippine Defense Secretary Delfin Lorenzana and Philippine Navy Rear Admiral Adelius Bordado.

== Service history ==
The BRP Antonio Luna sailed to Palawan on their first deployment.

Antonio Luna conducted a man overboard drill in the South China Sea on February 21, 2022. Antonio Luna participated in RIMPAC 2022 where it was adjudged one of the best Gunnery Ships in the Exercise, earning third place in the "Naval Surface Fire Support (NSFS) Rodeo" despite joining the exercise for the first time and being commissioned into Service for just over a year.

On 27 April 2023, Antonio Luna departed Naval Operating Base Subic to take part in the ASEAN-India Maritime Exercise (AIME) 2023 to be held on May 2–8 at Singapore. Antonio Luna with its crew launched maritime patrol in the South China Sea (West Philippine Sea) on September 22–24, and visited Philippine-occupied islands of Thitu Island (Pag-asa), Northeast Cay (Parola), West York Island (Likas), and Nanshan Island (Lawak). On 9 October, Antonio Luna participated in the exercise Sama-Sama 2023, together with other navies from the United States, Japan, Canada, and United Kingdom.

On 7 April 2024, Antonio Luna conducted a joint patrol in the South China Sea with BRP Gregorio del Pilar, BRP Valentin Diaz, USS Mobile of the United States Navy, HMAS Warramunga of the Royal Australian Navy, and JS Akebono of the Japan Maritime Self-Defense Force. This marked the first multinational patrol between the nations.

On 27 August 2025, Antonio Luna sustained minor damage to its freeboard while it was participating at the MALPHI LAUT Exercise 2025 at the Lumut Naval Base in Perak, Malaysia.

On 14 March 2026, Antonio Luna's pennant number changed to FFG15 from FF-150.
