= USS Tempest =

USS Tempest may refer to the following ships operated by the United States Navy:

- USS Tempest (1862), a Civil War gunboat which served in the Mississippi River
- USS Tempest (1869), a monitor renamed USS Yuma.
- USS Tempest (PC-2), placed in 'Commission Special' status until December 2005, when she was formally commissioned as a Coast Guard Cutter. She was returned to the US Navy on 22 August 2008.
