= JS Akebono (DD-108) =

Destroyer of the Japan Maritime Self-Defense Force

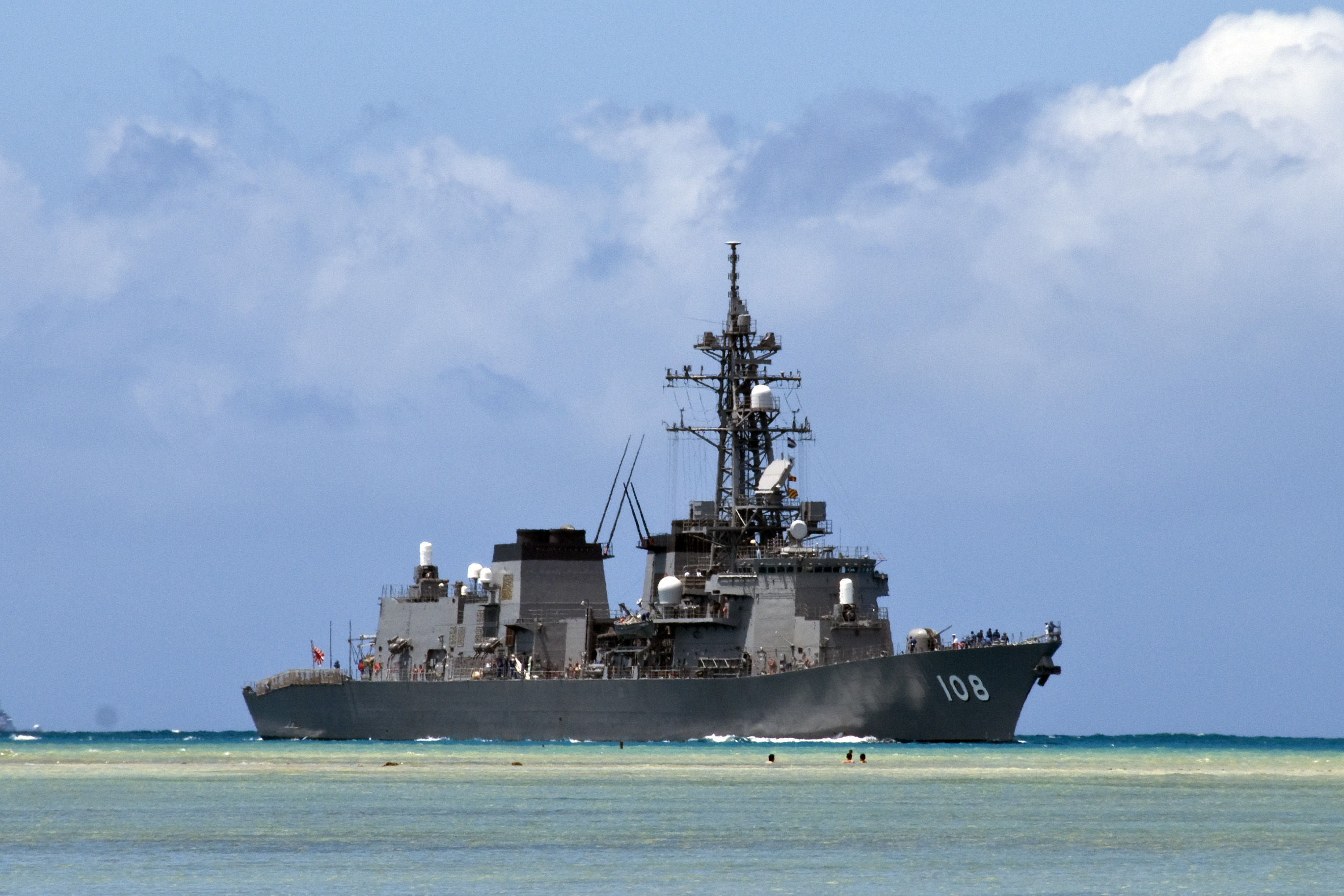
- JS Akebono at Pearl Harbor in 2010

History

Japan
- Name: Akebono; (あけぼの)
- Ordered: 1997
- Builder: IHI Corporation, Tokyo
- Laid down: 29 October 1999
- Launched: 25 September 2000
- Commissioned: 19 March 2002
- Home port: Kure
- Identification: MMSI number: 431999654; Pennant number:DD-108
- Status: Active

General characteristics
- Class & type: Murasame-class destroyer
- Displacement: 4,550 tons standard, 6,200 tons hull load
- Length: 151 m (495 ft 5 in)
- Beam: 17.4 m (57 ft 1 in)
- Draft: 5.2 m (17 ft 1 in)
- Propulsion: 2 × IHI-GE LM2500 gas turbines; 2 × KHI-RR SM1C gas turbines; 60,000 shp (45 MW); 2 shafts, cp props
- Speed: 30 knots (56 km/h; 35 mph)
- Complement: 165
- Sensors & processing systems: OYQ-9 CDS (w/ Link-11); OYQ-103 ASWCS; FCS-2-31 fire-control systems; OPS-24B air search radar; OPS-28 surface search radar; OQS-5 hull sonar; OQR-2 TASS
- Electronic warfare & decoys: NOLQ-3 suite; Mk. 36 SRBOC Chaff and Decoy Launching System; AN/SLQ-25 torpedo decoys
- Armament: 1 × OTO Melara 76 mm gun; 2 × 20 mm Phalanx CIWS; 8 × SSM-1B Anti-ship missile in quad canisters; 2 × triple 324 mm torpedo tubes; 16-cell Mk. 48 VLS with Evolved Sea Sparrow SAM; 16-cell Mk. 41 VLS with VL-ASROC
- Aircraft carried: 1 × SH-60J/K anti-submarine helicopter

JS Akebono (DD-108) is the eighth ship of Murasame-class destroyers. She was commissioned on 19 March 2002.

== Design ==
The hull design was completely renovated from first-generation destroyers. In addition to increasing the size in order to reduce the underwater radiation noise, both the superstructure and hull were inclined to reduce the radar cross-section. There is however no angled tripod mainmast like that of the American Arleigh Burke-class destroyer because of the heavy weather of the Sea of Japan in winter. The aft was designed like a "mini-Oranda-zaka" as with the Kongō class to avoid interference between helicopters and mooring devices. Destroyers built under the First Defense Build-up Plan, including the former Murasame class, adopted a unique long forecastle style called "Oranda-zaka".

The engine arrangement is COGAG as same as Asagiri class, but a pair of engines are updated to Spey SM1C. The remaining one pair were replaced with LM2500 versions, same as in the Kongō class.

== Construction and career ==
Akebono was laid down on 29 October 1999 at IHI Corporation Tokyo as the 1997 plan and launched on 25 September 2000. The vessel was commissioned on 19 March 2002, and was incorporated into the 4th Escort Corps and deployed to Kure.

In June 2019, Akebono was dispatched to additionally participate in the 2019 Indo-Pacific dispatch training in which the vessels JS Izumo and JS Murasame were participating. The destroyer conducted joint training with the navies of each country in the Indo-Pacific region during the deployment.

On 7 April 2024, Akebono conducted a joint patrol in the South China Sea with BRP Antonio Luna and BRP Valentin Diaz of the Philippine Navy, USS Mobile of the US Navy, and HMAS Warramunga of the Royal Australian Navy. This marked the first multinational patrol among the nations.

In 2025, Akebono joined the Royal Navy's carrier strike group as part of Operation Highmast in a deployment to the Indo-Pacific region. The ship, as part of the UK strike group, along with HMS Prince of Wales (R09), HMS Richmond (F239), RFA Tidespring (A136) and HNoMS Roald Amundsen (F311) of the Royal Norwegian Navy, took part in Exercise Konkan 2025, a bilateral and biennial maritime exercise conducted the Royal Navy and the Indian Navy, between 5 and 8 October 2025. The Indian Navy was represented by INS Vikrant and its Carrier Battle Group (CBG), consisting of INS Kolkata (D63), INS Mormugao (D67), INS Surat (D69), INS Tabar (F44), INS Teg (F45) and INS Deepak (A50). This is the maiden instance of a dual carrier operation between the countries. On 8 October, the Indian Air Force deployed its Su-30MKI and Jaguar aircraft for a one-day exercise with the group. Following the conclusion of the exercise, Richmond and Prince of Wales conduct a port call at Indira Dock, Mumbai and Goa, respectively.

On 28 October 2025, Akebono arrived at the Port of Colombo, Sri Lanka, on a goodwill mission under the command of Commander Arai Katsutomo. The vessel is scheduled to depart the island on 31 October.

== Gallery ==
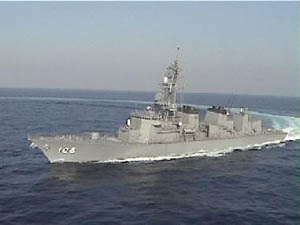
JS Akebono on 24 February 2009.

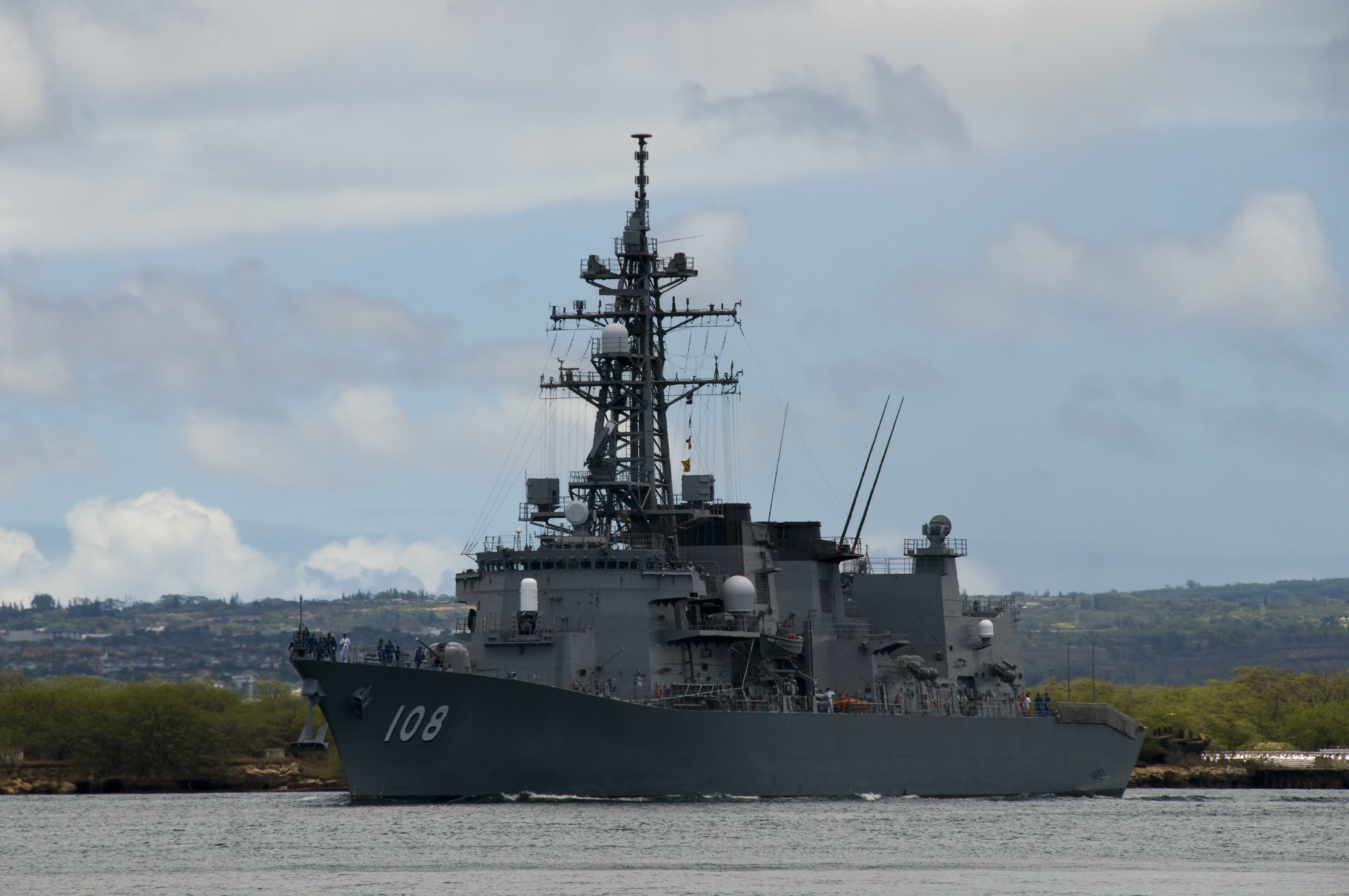
JS Akebono leaving Pearl Harbor on 6 July 2010.

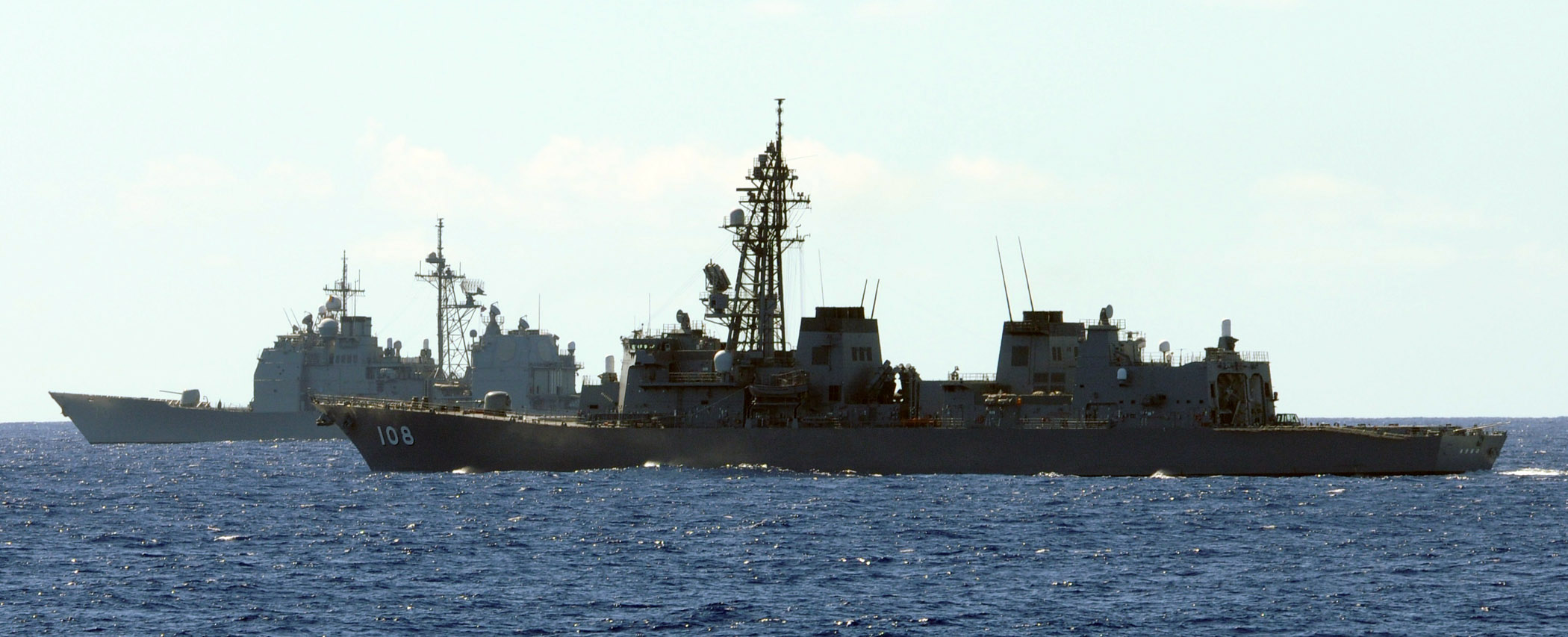
JS Akebono and USS Lake Erie on 14 July 2010.

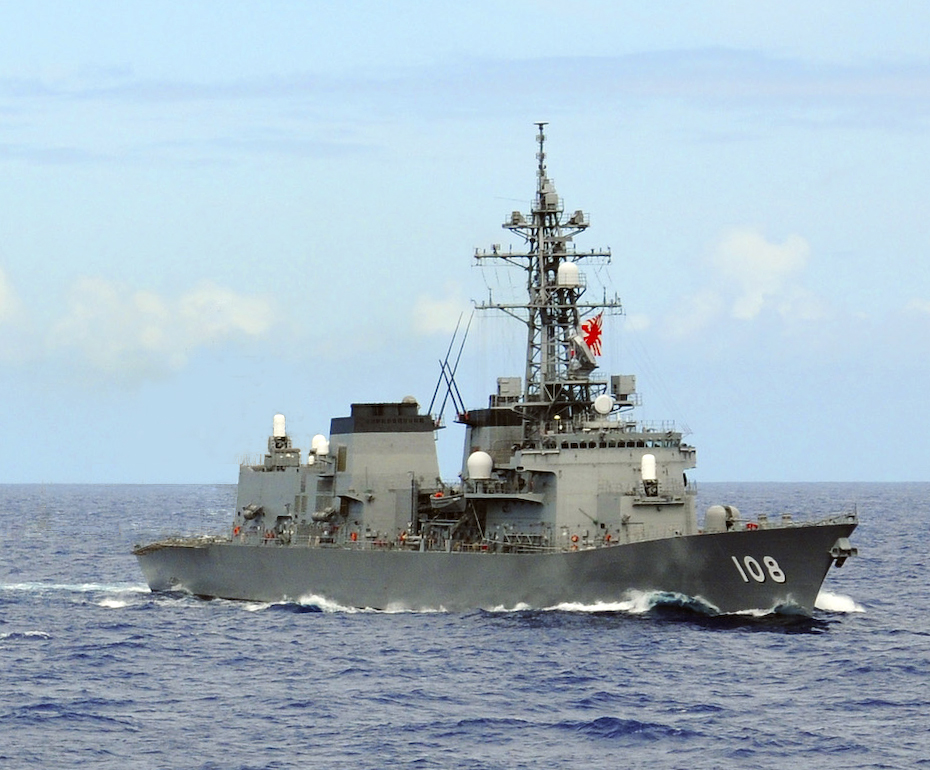
JS Akebono underway on 14 July 2010.

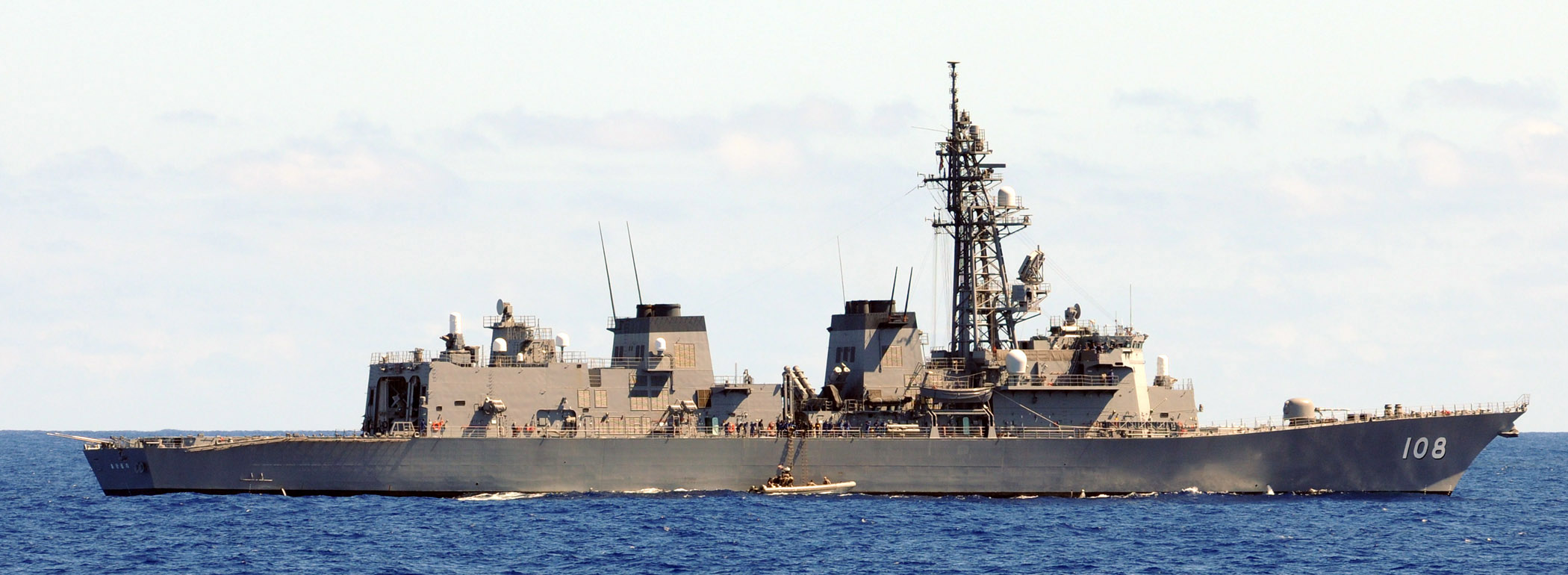
JS Akebono underway on 14 July 2010.

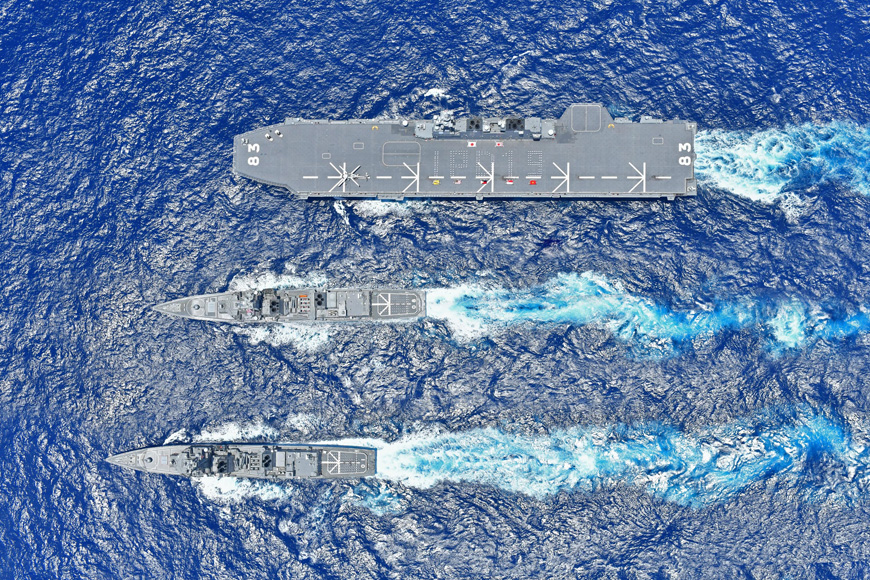
JS Akebono, JS Murasame and JS Izumo on 26 July 2019.

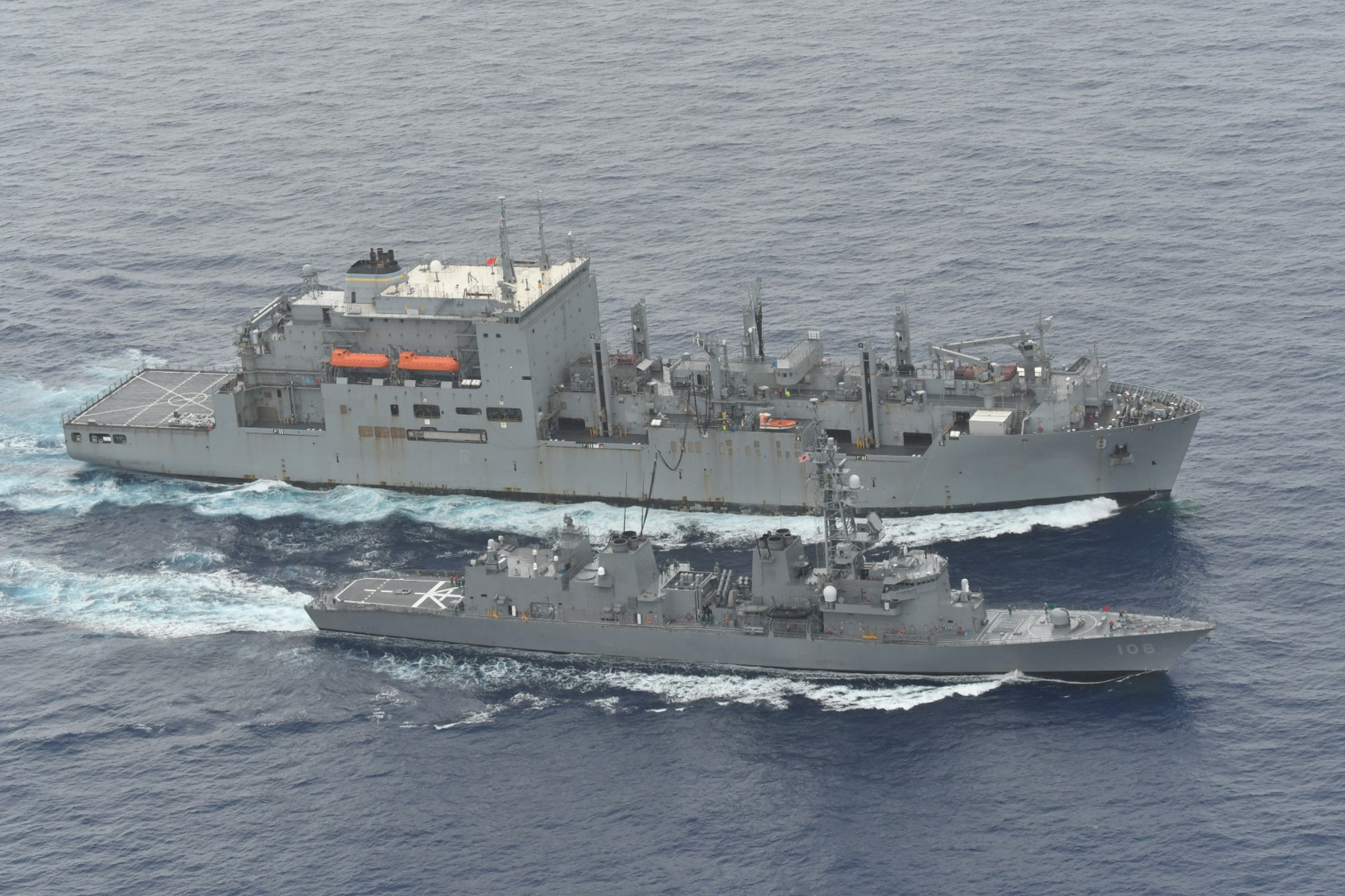
JS Akebono being replenished by USNS Wally Schirra, 2 October 2023.

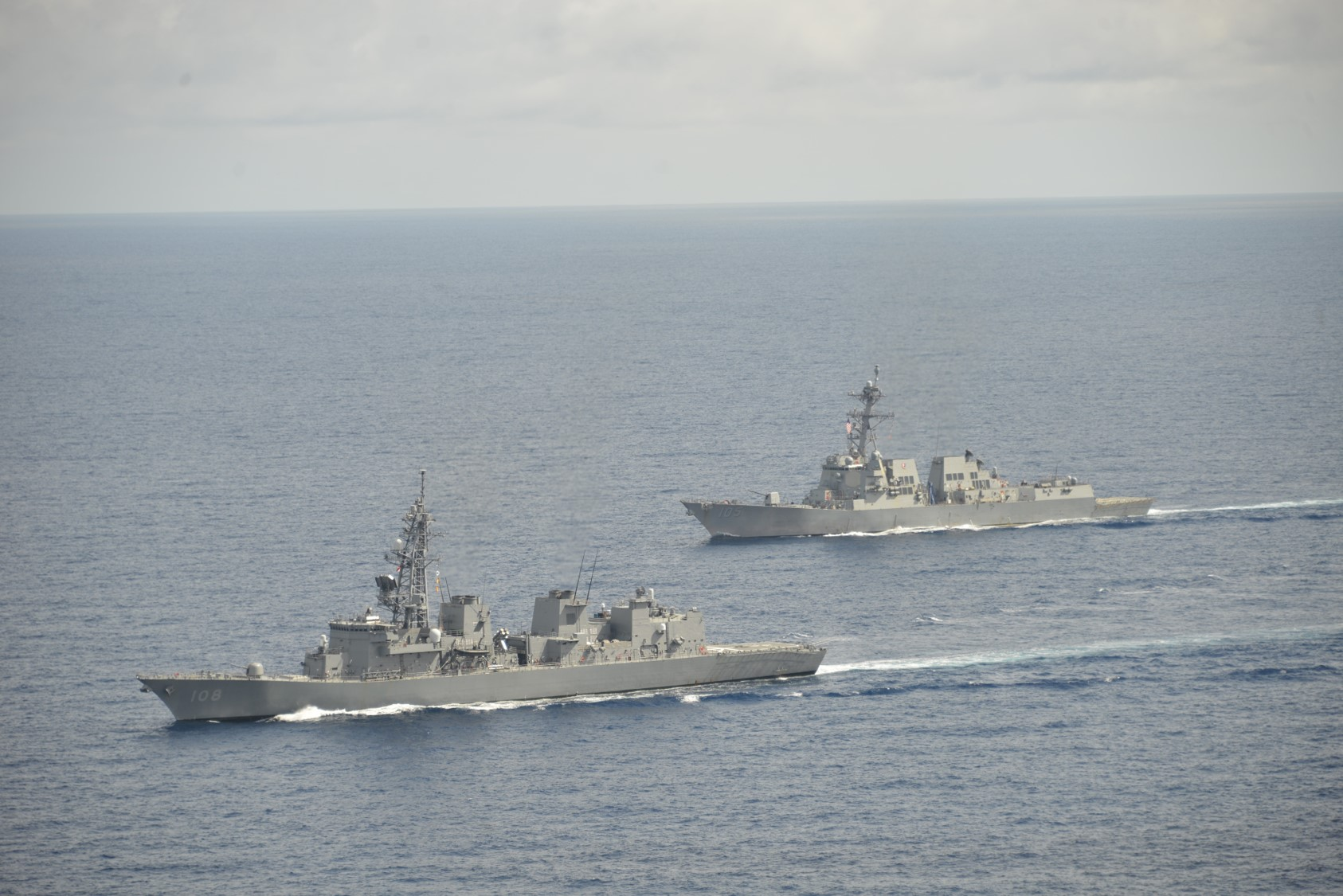
JS Akebono and USS Dewey on 18 October 2023.

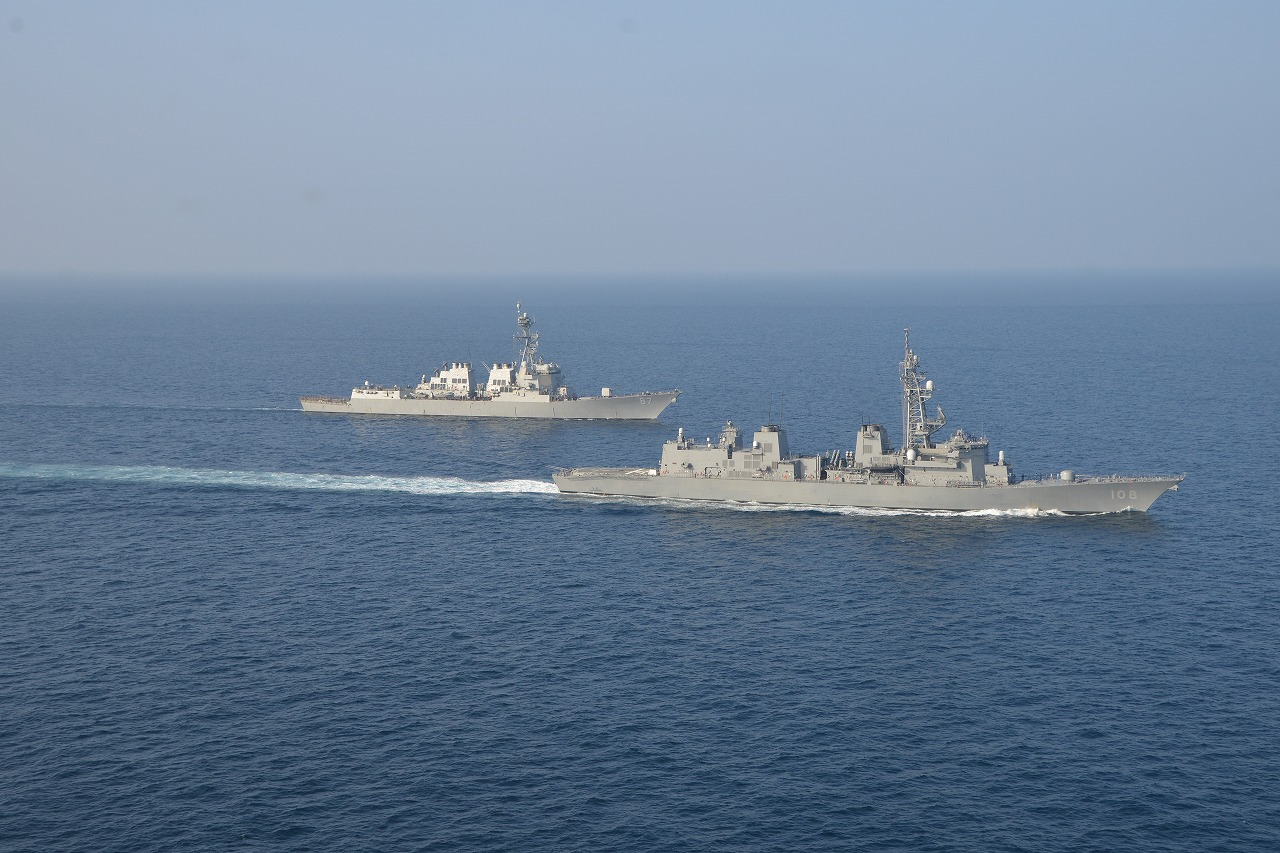
JS Akebono with USS Mustin during a PASSEX, 25 November 2023.

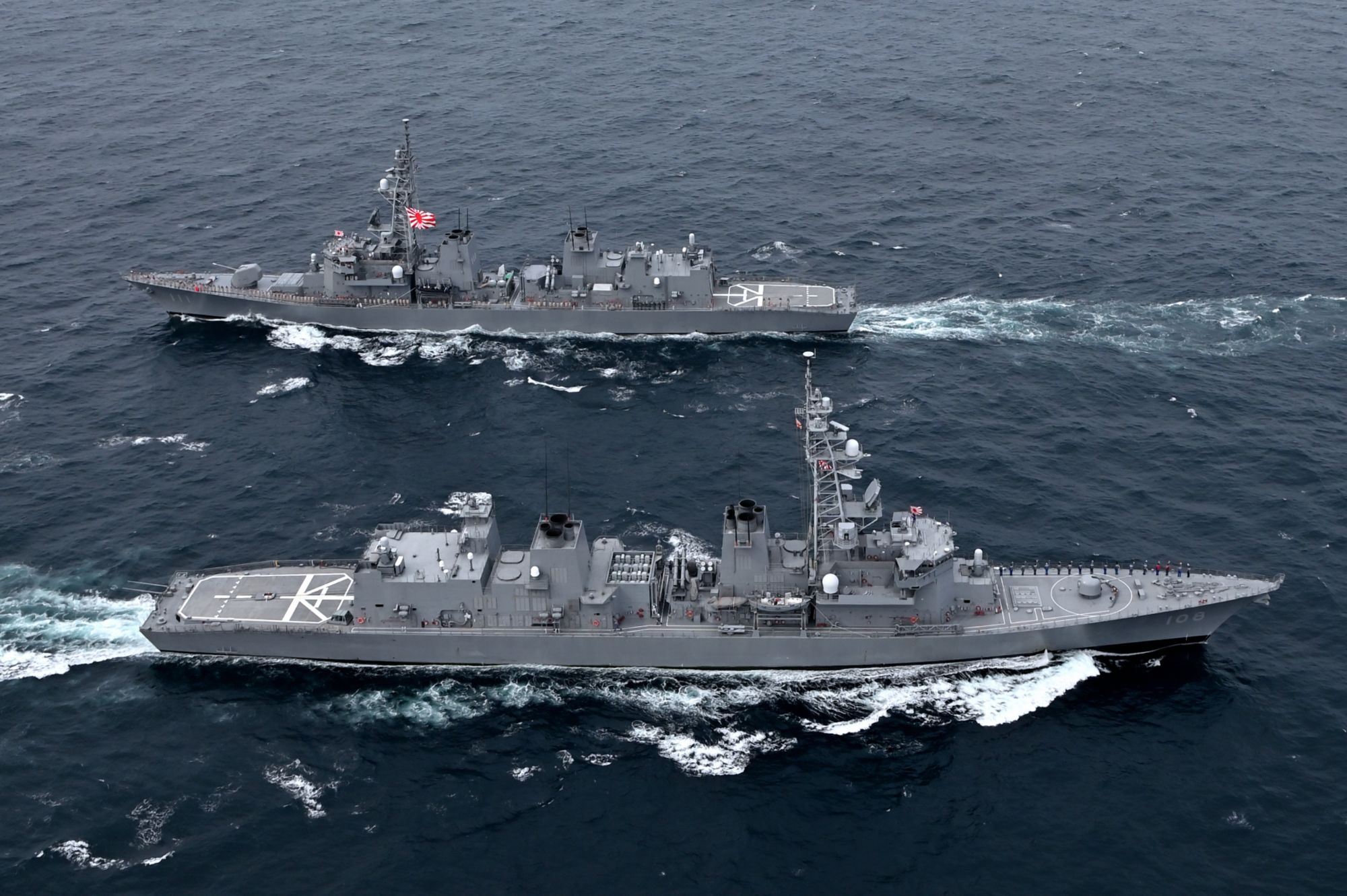
JS Akebono with JS Ōnami, 1 October 2025.
