= USS Mobile (LCS-26) =

Independence-class littoral combat ship of the United States Navy

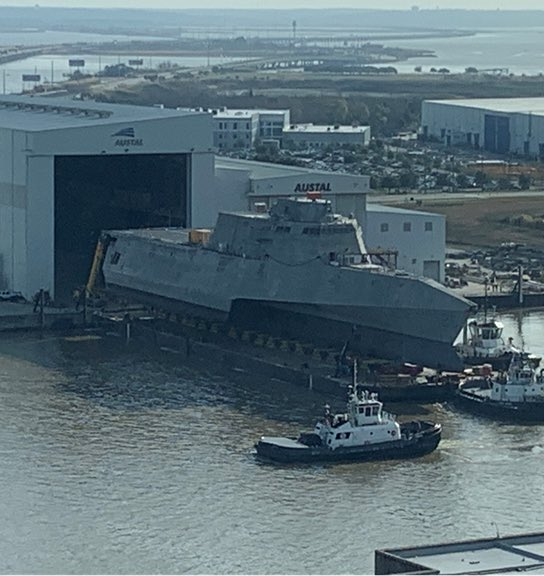
- USS Mobile on 9 January 2020

History

United States
- Name: Mobile
- Namesake: Mobile
- Awarded: 31 March 2016
- Builder: Austal USA
- Laid down: 14 December 2018
- Launched: 11 January 2020
- Sponsored by: Rebecca Byrne
- Christened: 7 December 2019
- Acquired: 9 December 2020
- Commissioned: 22 May 2021
- Home port: San Diego
- Identification: Hull number: LCS-26
- Motto: Victory through Perseverance
- Status: Active
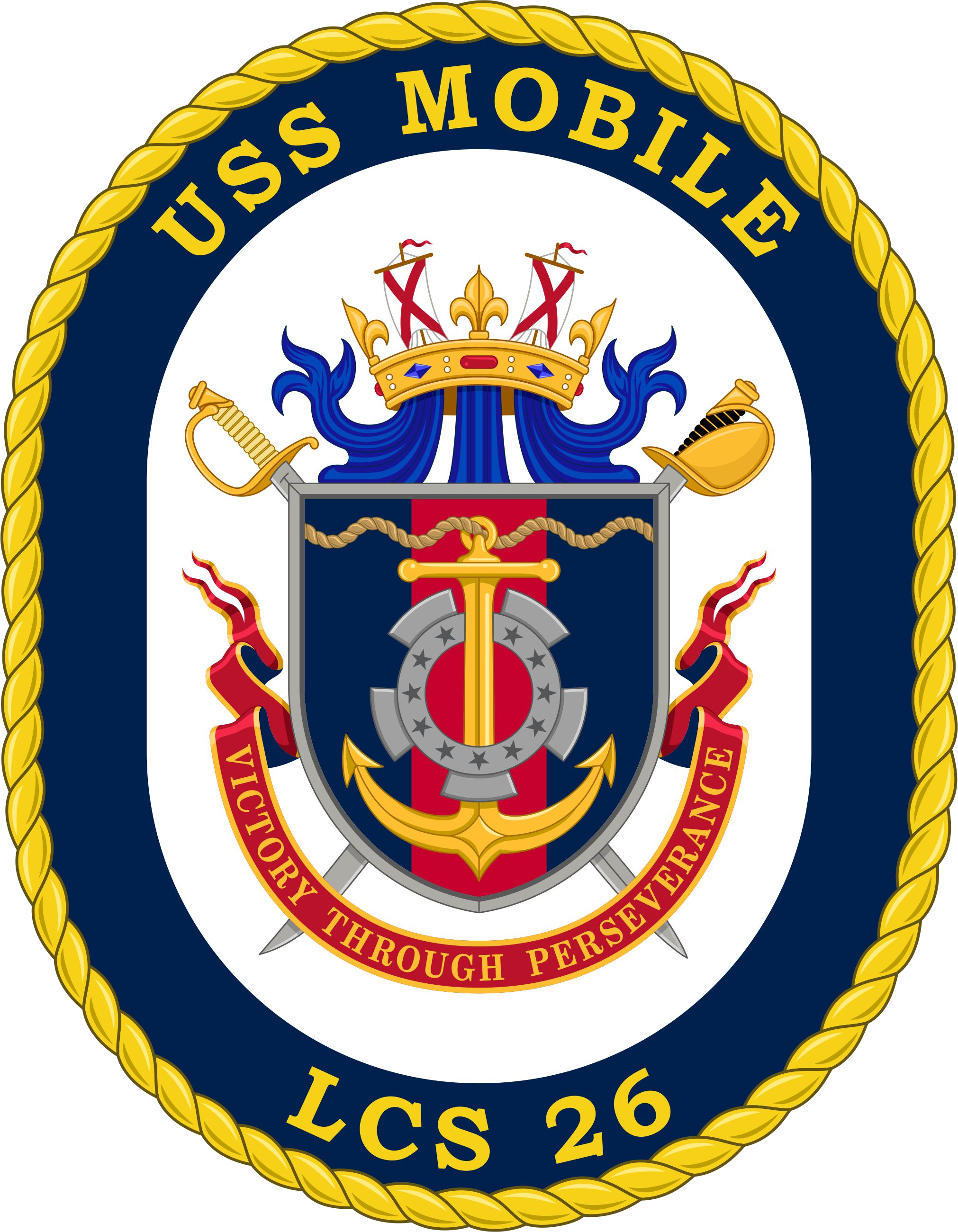
- Badge

General characteristics
- Class & type: Independence-class littoral combat ship
- Displacement: 2,307 metric tons light, 3,104 metric tons full, 797 metric tons deadweight
- Length: 127.4 m (418 ft)
- Beam: 31.6 m (104 ft)
- Draft: 14 ft (4.27 m)
- Propulsion: 2× gas turbines, 2× diesel, 4× waterjets, retractable Azimuth thruster, 4× diesel generators
- Speed: 40 knots (74 km/h; 46 mph)+, 47 knots (54 mph; 87 km/h) sprint
- Range: 4,300 nautical miles (8,000 km; 4,900 mi) at 20 knots (37 km/h; 23 mph)+
- Capacity: 210 tonnes
- Complement: 40 core crew (8 officers, 32 enlisted) plus up to 35 mission crew
- Sensors & processing systems: Sea Giraffe 3D Surface/Air RADAR; Bridgemaster-E Navigational RADAR; AN/KAX-2 EO/IR sensor for GFC
- Electronic warfare & decoys: EDO ES-3601 ESM; 4× SRBOC rapid bloom chaff launchers
- Armament: BAE Systems Mk 110 57 mm gun; 4× .50 cal (12.7 mm) guns (2 aft, 2 forward); Evolved SeaRAM 11 cell missile launcher; Mission modules
- Aircraft carried: 2× MH-60R/S Seahawks

USS Mobile (LCS-26) is an Independence-class littoral combat ship of the United States Navy. Named for the city of Mobile, Alabama, she is the fifth ship to carry the name.

== Design ==
In 2002, the United States Navy initiated a program to develop the first of a fleet of littoral combat ships. The Navy initially ordered two trimaran hulled ships from General Dynamics, which became known as the Independence-class littoral combat ship after the first ship of the class, USS Independence. Even-numbered US Navy littoral combat ships are built using the Independence-class trimaran design, while odd-numbered ships are based on a competing design, the conventional monohull Freedom-class littoral combat ship. The initial order of littoral combat ships involved a total of four ships, including two of the Independence-class design. On 29 December 2010, the Navy announced that it was awarding Austal USA a contract to build ten additional Independence-class littoral combat ships.

== Construction and career ==
Mobile was built in her namesake city by Austal USA. The Navy accepted delivery of Mobile on 9 December 2020, during a ceremony held at the Austal USA shipyards. Mobile was commissioned on 22 May 2021.

On 7 April 2024, Mobile conducted a joint patrol in the South China Sea with BRP Antonio Luna and BRP Valentin Diaz of the Philippine Navy, HMAS Warramunga of the Royal Australian Navy, and JS Akebono of the Japan Maritime Self-Defense Force. This marked the first multinational patrol between the nations.
