= HMAS Warramunga =

Two ships of the Royal Australian Navy have been named HMAS Warramunga, after the Warumungu Aborigines.

- HMAS Warramunga (I44), a Tribal-class destroyer commissioned in 1942. The ship fought during the latter half of World War II, and in the Korean War. She was decommissioned in 1959, and sold for scrap.
- HMAS Warramunga (FFH 152), an Anzac-class frigate commissioned in 2001 and in active service as of 2016

== Battle honours ==
Six battle honours have been awarded to ships named HMAS Warramunga.

- Pacific 1943–45
- New Guinea 1943–44
- Leyte Gulf 1944
- Lingayen Gulf 1945
- Borneo 1945
- Korea 1951–52
