= USS Tempest (PC-2) =

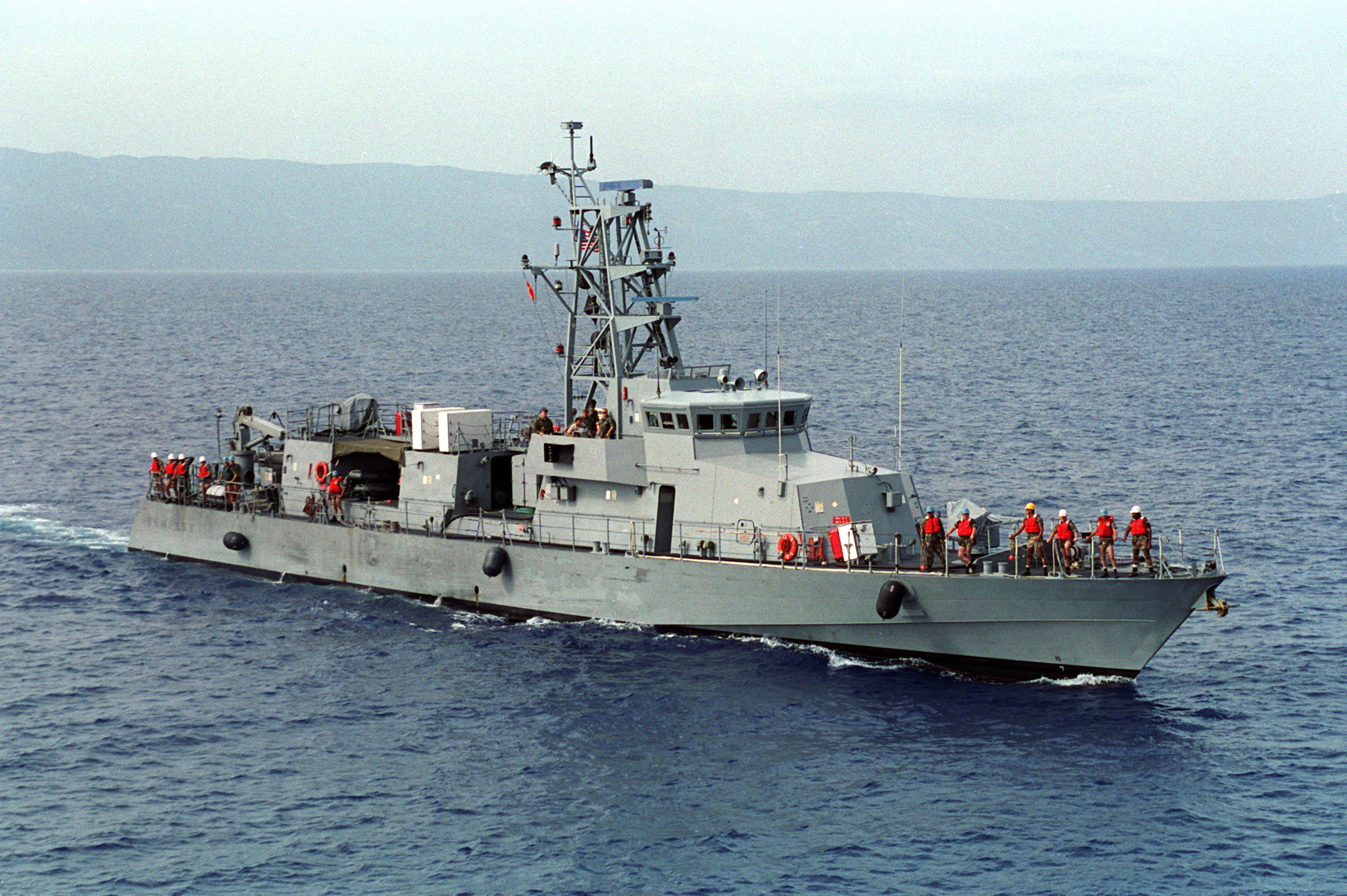
- USS Tempest (PC-2)

History

United States
- Name: Tempest
- Namesake: a type of violent, windy storm
- Ordered: 3 August 1990
- Builder: Bollinger Shipyards, Lockport, Louisiana
- Laid down: 30 September 1991
- Launched: 4 April 1992
- Sponsored by: Sara Livingston
- Commissioned: 21 August 1993
- Identification: Hull symbol: PC-2; Call sign: NTAC
- Motto: "Perseverance and Courage"
- Fate: Transferred to the United States Coast Guard, 1 October 2004
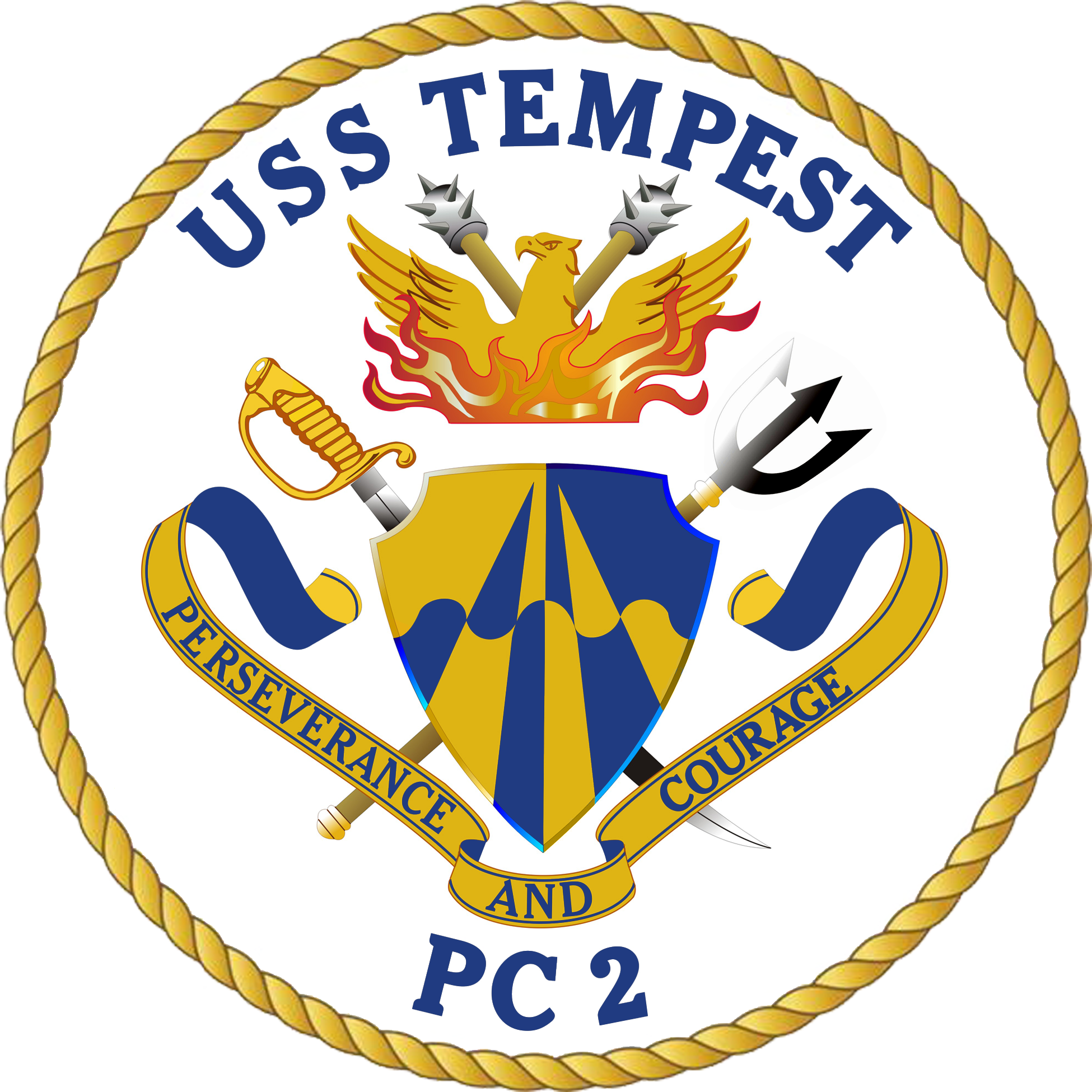
- Badge

United States
- Name: Tempest
- Acquired: 1 October 2004
- Identification: Hull symbol: WPC-2
- Fate: Transferred to the US Navy, 22 August 2008

United States
- Name: Tempest
- Acquired: 22 August 2008
- Decommissioned: 7 March 2022
- Home port: Manama, Bahrain
- Fate: Transferred to Bahrain

Bahrain
- Name: RBNS Al-Gurairiyah (الغريرية)
- Acquired: 30 March 2022
- Identification: Hull number (70)
- Status: Active

General characteristics
- Class & type: Cyclone-class patrol ship
- Displacement: 328.5 long tons (333.8 t) (light load); 331 long tons (336 t) (full load)
- Length: 170 ft (52 m); 179 ft (55 m) (refit)
- Beam: 25 ft (7.6 m)
- Draft: 7.5 ft (2.3 m)
- Installed power: 4 × Paxman marine diesel engines (13,400 shp (10,000 kW) combined)
- Propulsion: 4 × shafts
- Speed: 35 kn (65 km/h; 40 mph)
- Complement: 4 officers; 24 enlisted; 8 special forces
- Sensors & processing systems: Sperry Vision 2100M integrated navigation/combat system
- Electronic warfare & decoys: 1 × MK 52 chaff launcher
- Armament: 2 × 25 mm (0.98 in) MK 38 "Bushmaster" chain gun (Aft mount removed in refit); 2 × 40 mm (1.6 in) MK 19 grenade launchers; 2 × .50 in (12.7 mm) caliber machine guns; 6 × FIM-92 Stinger SAMs; 1 × Mk96 25 mm cannon/40mm grenade launcher (Refit)

USS Tempest (PC-2) was the second of the Cyclone-class of United States Navy coastal patrol ships, named for various weather phenomena. She was transferred to the US Coast Guard as USCGC Tempest (WPC-2), on 1 October 2004, and placed in 'Commission Special' status until December 2005, when she was formally commissioned as a Coast Guard cutter. She was returned to the US Navy on 22 August 2008.

== Construction ==
Tempest, the third US vessel to carry the name, was laid down on 30 September 1991, at Lockport, Louisiana, by Bollinger Machine Shop and Shipyard; launched on 4 April 1992; sponsored by Sara Livingston, wife of US Marine Corps Major General James E. Livingston, and commissioned on 21 August 1993, at Naval Amphibious Base Little Creek, Virginia.

== Service history ==
Following the Haitian Army's overthrow of President Jean-Bertrand Aristide in September 1991, a succession of governments led to sectarian violence, and in May 1994, the military installed Supreme Court Justice Emile Jonassaint as Haiti's provisional president. The United Nations (UN) authorized force to restore order and the US initiated Operations Support Democracy and Uphold/Restore Democracy: Uphold Democracy for a peaceful entry into Haiti, and Restore Democracy in the event of resistance.

Tempest steamed from Little Creek in company with Cyclone on 24 May 1994, and patrolled the Haitian coast for over three months during Operation Support Democracy as the Haitians agreed to allow the Americans to land peacefully, operating at times with Navy SEAL Teams 4 and 8 and Special Boat Unit 20. On 6 July, amphibious assault ship Inchon sailed from Norfolk, Virginia, in response to the crisis. Another amphibious assault ship, Wasp relieved Inchon in Haitian waters on 17 August. The crisis escalated the following month, however, prompting an enlarged response by a multinational force that included the aircraft carriers America and Dwight D. Eisenhower. About 1,800 soldiers of the US Army's XVIII Airborne Corps embarked on board Dwight D. Eisenhower. The US transferred peacekeeping functions to international forces on 31 March 1995.

Coast Guard Pacific Area and the US Pacific Fleet jointly announced on 5 November 2001, the assignment of two Cyclone-class ships, Monsoon and Zephyr, in support of the nation's homeland security along the U.S. West Coast as a part of Operation Noble Eagle, where they operated under the tactical control of the Coast Guard Pacific Area command. Operational control of the ships, normally assigned to Special Operations Command through Commander, Naval Special Warfare Command, shifted to the Pacific Fleet. Three other Cyclone-class ships, Shamal, Tempest, and Tornado were to be assigned to the US Atlantic Fleet for maritime homeland security operations, and home ported at Pascagoula, Mississippi.

The Coast Guard acquired five of the Navy's Cyclone-class patrol ship beginning on 1 October 2004. The Coast Guard initiated the action because of its aging fleet, increased operational hours following the terrorist attack on 9/11, delays in delivery of the converted 123-foot patrol boats, and the continued deployment of 110-foot cutters to the Persian Gulf, all of which created a gap in patrol boat availability. The transfer immediately lessened shortfalls in patrol boat hours. The Navy and Coast Guard signed an agreement in August 2004, that allowed five ships to be under the operational command of the Coast Guard. Two of the five ships were scheduled to be returned to the Navy in 2008; the remainder in 2011.

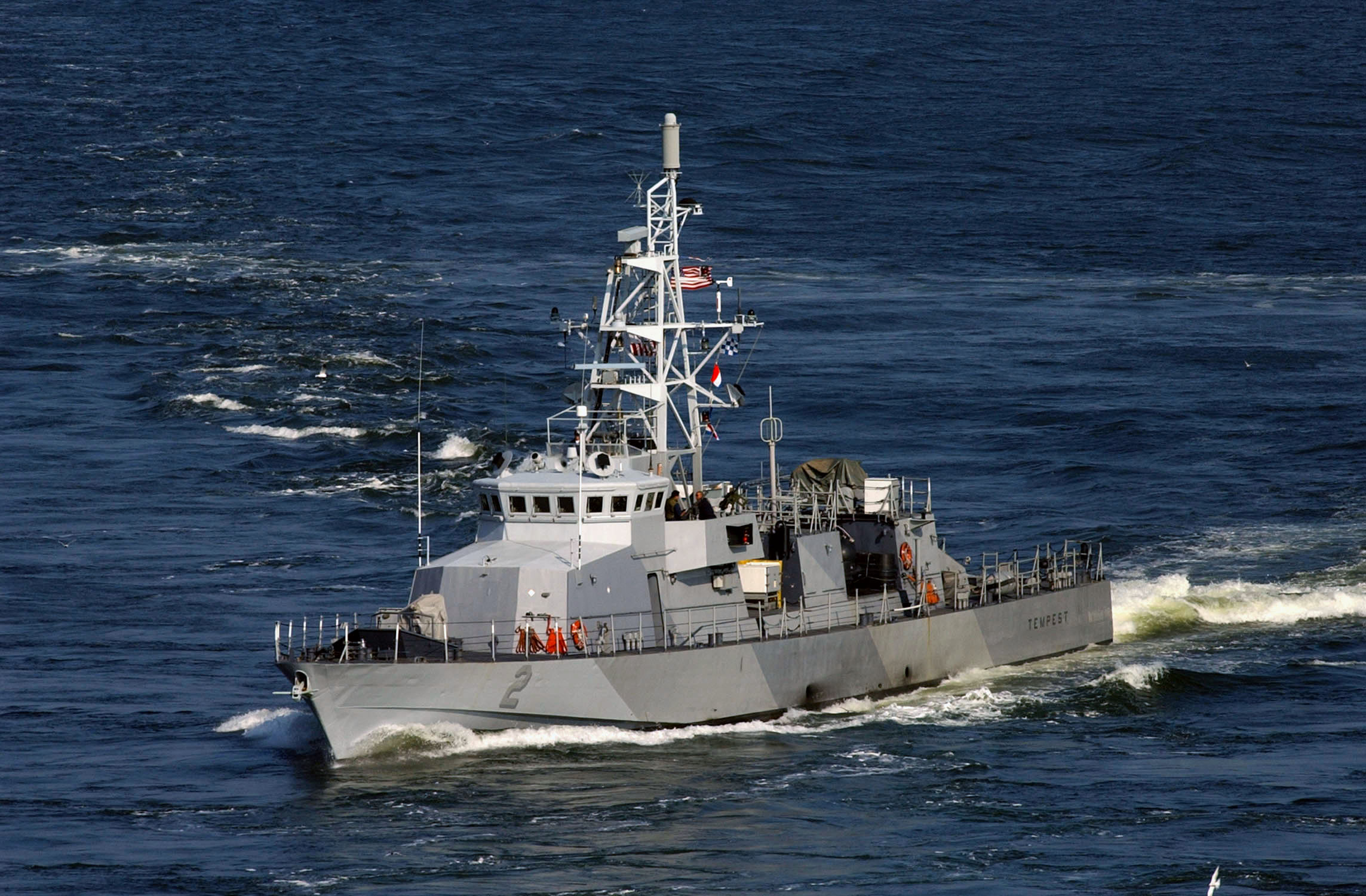
USS Tempest, July 2003

The Memorandum of Understanding directed the Navy to retain ownership as well as the responsibility for all life cycle management/maintenance, depot management, and casualty corrective service through 2008. The Coast Guard assumed the "responsibility for crew assignment, cutter funding, retrofitting, operation and management." Tempest was decommissioned and transferred to the Coast Guard, which reclassified her as WPC-2, on September 30, 2004. The Coast Guard operated her until 22 August 2008, when she was returned to the Navy.

In 2013, Tempest shifted homeport to Naval Support Activity Bahrain. While deployed to the Persian Gulf, on 24 August 2016, Squall fired three warning shots from a .50 in (12.7 mm) cal. machine gun at an Iranian Revolutionary Guard Navy fast attack craft that approached within 200 yd (180 m) of Tempest. The fast attack craft had ignored radio calls to veer off as well as warning flares.

On 7 March 2022, the ship was decommissioned during a ceremony at Naval Support Activity Bahrain. On 30 March 2022, this ship was commissioned as RBNS Al-Gurariyah (70).

== Bibliography ==
- Evans, Mark L. (7 July 2015). "Tempest III (PC-2)". Dictionary of American Naval Fighting Ships. Navy Department, Naval History and Heritage Command. This article incorporates text from this source, which is in the public domain.
- "USS Tempest (PC 2)". NavSource.
- "US warship fires warning shots at Iranian boat". CBS News. 25 August 2016.
