= USS Oakland =

Multiple ships of the United States Navy have borne the name Oakland, in honor of the city of Oakland, California.

- USS Oakland (ID-2847), built in 1918, was a steamship originally built for British owners. She was pressed into USN service for service during World War I. She was decommissioned after short service.
- USS Oakland (CL-95), was an Atlanta-class cruiser commissioned in 1943 and served during World War II and decommissioned in 1949
- USS Oakland (LCS-24) is an Independence-class littoral combat ship. Commissioned on 17 April 2021, in Oakland, California.
