= USS Omaha (LCS-12) =

Independence-class littoral combat ship

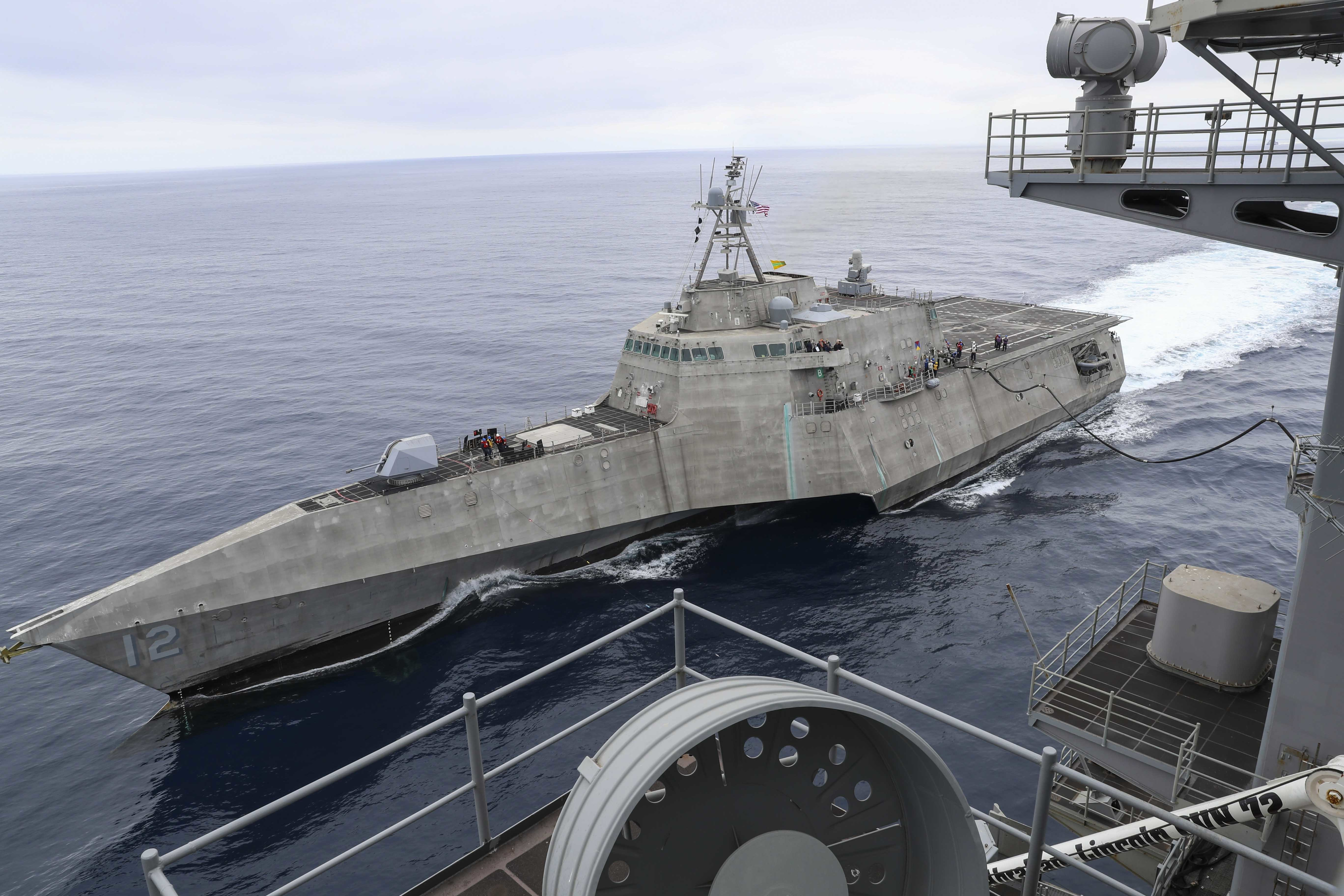
- USS Omaha underway on 8 August 2021

History

United States
- Name: Omaha
- Namesake: Omaha
- Awarded: 29 December 2010
- Builder: Austal USA
- Laid down: 18 February 2015
- Launched: 20 November 2015
- Sponsored by: Susan Alice Buffett
- Christened: 19 December 2015
- Acquired: 15 September 2017
- Commissioned: 3 February 2018
- Home port: San Diego
- Identification: MMSI number: 368926056; Callsign: NOMA; Hull number: LCS-12
- Motto: Fortiter In Re; (Resolute In Deed)
- Status: Active
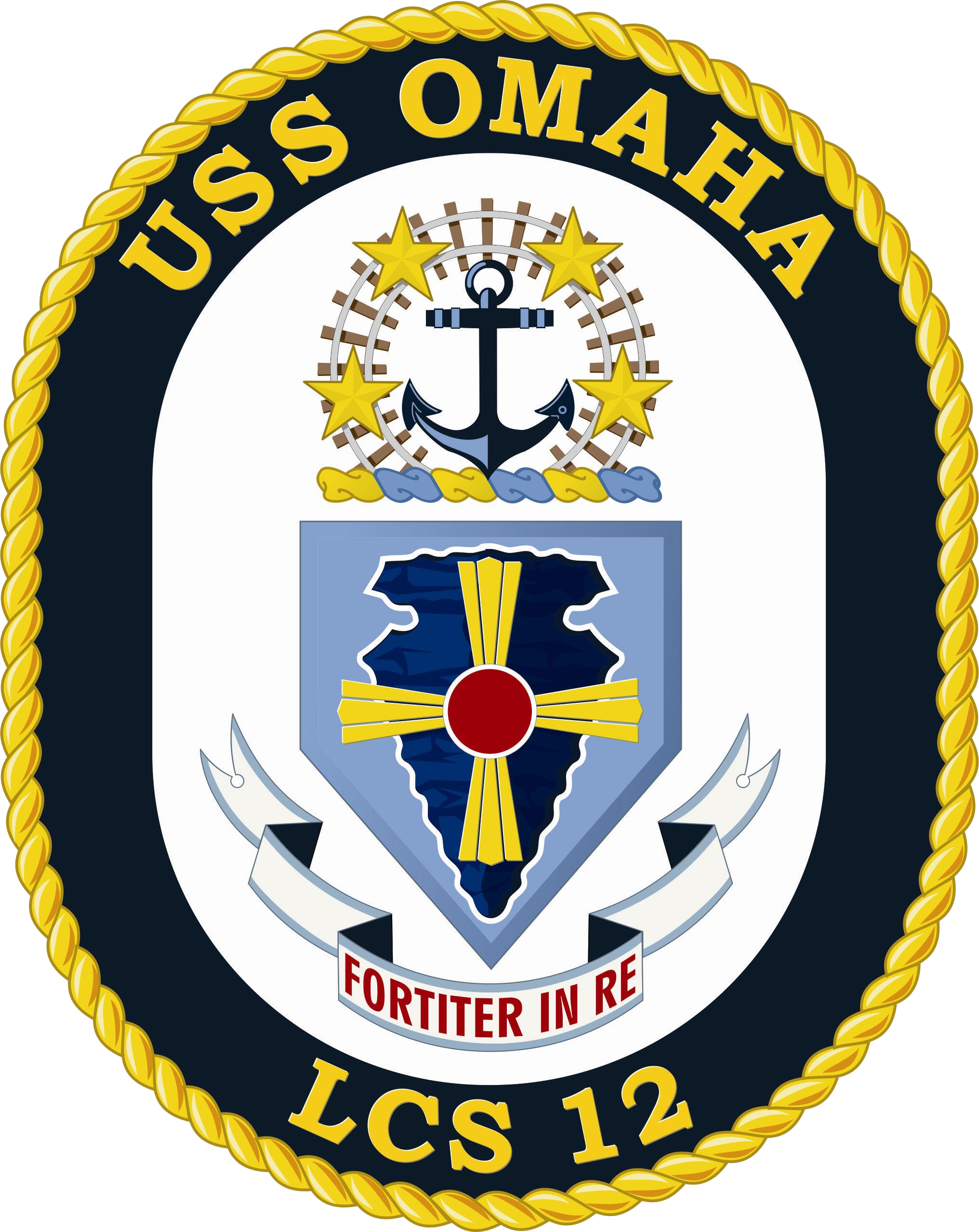
- Badge

General characteristics
- Class & type: Independence-class littoral combat ship
- Displacement: 2,307 t (2,271 long tons) light; 3,104 t (3,055 long tons) full; 797 t (784 long tons) deadweight
- Length: 127.4 m (418 ft)
- Beam: 31.6 m (104 ft)
- Draft: 4.3 m (14 ft)
- Propulsion: 2 × gas turbines, 2 × diesel, 4 × waterjets, retractable Azimuth thruster, 4 × diesel generators
- Speed: +40 knots (74 km/h; 46 mph), 47 knots (87 km/h; 54 mph) sprint
- Range: 4,300 nmi (8,000 km; 4,900 mi) at 20 knots (37 km/h; 23 mph)+
- Capacity: 210 t (210 long tons; 230 short tons)
- Complement: 40 core crew (8 officers, 32 enlisted) plus up to 35 mission crew
- Sensors & processing systems: Sea Giraffe 3D Surface/Air RADAR; Bridgemaster-E Navigational RADAR; AN/KAX-2 EO/IR sensor for GFC
- Electronic warfare & decoys: EDO ES-3601 ESM; 4 × SRBOC rapid bloom chaff launchers
- Armament: BAE Systems Mk 110 57 mm (2.2 in) gun; 4 × .50 cal (12.7 mm) guns (2 aft, 2 forward); Evolved SeaRAM 11 cell missile launcher; Mission modules
- Aircraft carried: 2 × MH-60R/S Seahawks

USS Omaha (LCS-12) is an Independence-class littoral combat ship of the United States Navy. She is the fourth ship to be named for Omaha, the largest city in Nebraska. The vessel's keel was laid down on 18 February 2015 at the Austal USA shipyard in Mobile, Alabama and launched on 20 November. The ship was commissioned at San Diego, California on 3 February 2018 and was assigned to Littoral Combat Ship Squadron One.

== Design ==
In 2002, the United States Navy initiated a program to develop the first of a fleet of littoral combat ships. The Navy initially ordered two trimaran hulled ships from General Dynamics, which became known as the Independence-class littoral combat ship after the first ship of the class, USS Independence (LCS-2). Even-numbered U.S. Navy littoral combat ships are built using the Independence-class trimaran design, while odd-numbered ships are based on a competing design, the conventional monohull Freedom-class littoral combat ship. The initial order of littoral combat ships involved a total of four ships, including two of the Independence-class design. On 29 December 2010, the Navy announced that it was awarding Austal USA a contract to build ten additional Independence-class littoral combat ships.

== Construction and career ==
The vessel was ordered from Austal USA with a contract awarded on 29 December 2010. The ceremonial laying of the keel was on 18 February 2015, at their shipyard in Mobile, Alabama. Omaha was launched from Austal USA's shipyards in Mobile, Alabama on 20 November 2015. Omaha was christened on 19 December 2015. The ship's sponsor was Omaha philanthropist Susie Buffett. The littoral combat ship was the fourth ship to be named for Omaha, the largest city in Nebraska. Omaha was commissioned on 3 February 2018 in San Diego, California. She was assigned to Littoral Combat Ship Squadron One.

=== UFO incident ===
On 15 July 2019 alleged multiple UFOs were tracked on the ship's radar while training off the coast of San Diego. They were also recorded and posted online. Subsequent investigation by the Pentagon's Unidentified Aerial Phenomena Task Force (UAPTF) failed to determine the nature or origin of the phenomena, which remain unexplained. Skeptical investigator and science writer Mick West commented on the posted video, stating that "What we’ve got to go with here is the simplest explanation and really the simplest explanation is that it’s just a plane. It moves like a plane, it acts like a plane".
