= USS Augusta (LCS-34) =

Independence-class littoral combat ship of the United States Navy

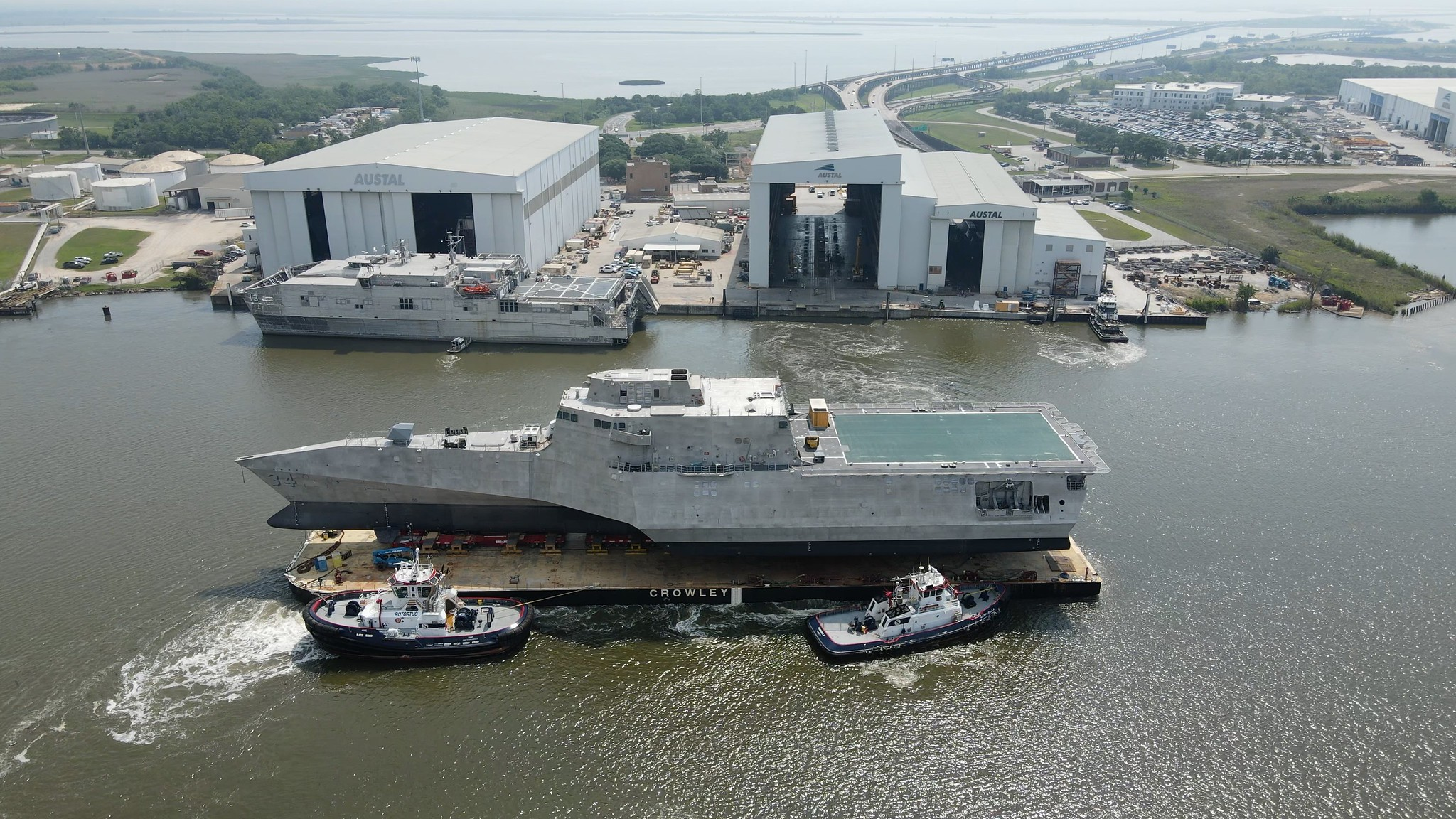
- USS Augusta being launched at Austal Shipyards.

History

United States
- Name: Augusta
- Namesake: Augusta
- Awarded: 18 September 2018
- Builder: Austal USA
- Laid down: 30 July 2021
- Launched: 23 May 2022
- Sponsored by: Leigh Ingalls Saufley
- Christened: 17 December 2022
- Acquired: 12 May 2023
- Commissioned: 30 September 2023
- Home port: San Diego
- Identification: Hull number: LCS-34
- Motto: Protecting the Frontier
- Status: In active service
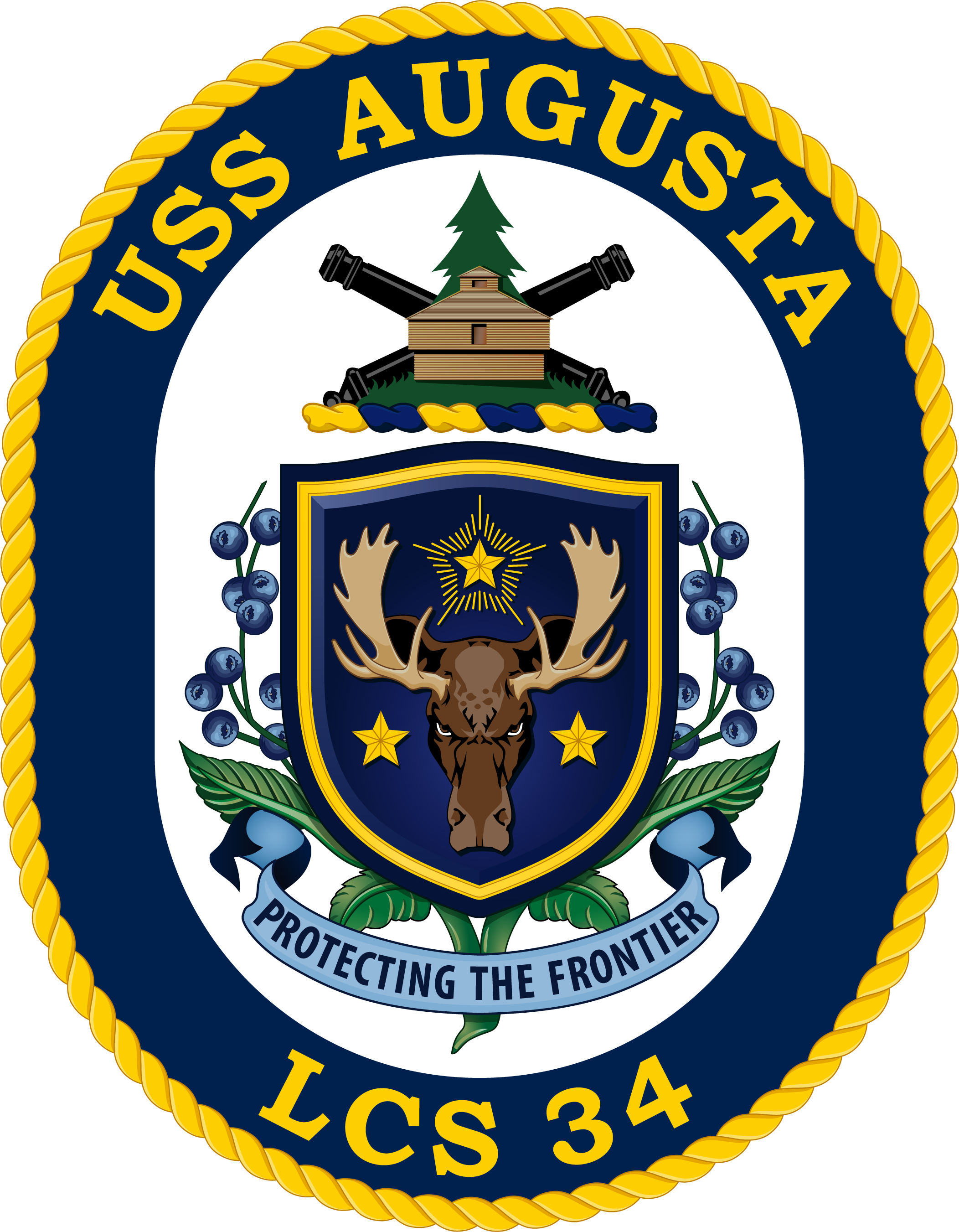
- Badge

General characteristics
- Class & type: Independence-class littoral combat ship
- Displacement: 2,307 metric tons light, 3,104 metric tons full, 797 metric tons deadweight
- Length: 127.4 m (418 ft)
- Beam: 31.6 m (104 ft)
- Draft: 14 ft (4.27 m)
- Propulsion: 2× gas turbines, 2× diesel, 4× waterjets, retractable Azimuth thruster, 4× diesel generators
- Speed: 40 knots (74 km/h; 46 mph)+, 47 knots (54 mph; 87 km/h) sprint
- Range: 4,300 nautical miles (8,000 km; 4,900 mi) at 20 knots (37 km/h; 23 mph)+
- Capacity: 210 tonnes
- Complement: 40 core crew (8 officers, 32 enlisted) plus up to 35 mission crew
- Sensors & processing systems: Sea Giraffe 3D Surface/Air RADAR; Bridgemaster-E Navigational RADAR; AN/KAX-2 EO/IR sensor for GFC
- Electronic warfare & decoys: EDO ES-3601 ESM; 4× SRBOC rapid bloom chaff launchers
- Armament: BAE Systems Mk 110 57 mm gun; 4× .50 cal (12.7 mm) guns (2 aft, 2 forward); Evolved SeaRAM 11 cell missile launcher; Mission modules
- Aircraft carried: 2× MH-60R/S Seahawks

USS Augusta (LCS-34) is an Independence-class littoral combat ship of the United States Navy. She is the second ship to be named for Augusta, Maine.

== Design ==
In 2002, the United States Navy initiated a program to develop the first of a fleet of littoral combat ships. The Navy initially ordered two trimaran hulled ships from General Dynamics, which became known as the Independence-class littoral combat ship after the first ship of the class, USS Independence. Even-numbered US Navy littoral combat ships are built using the Independence-class trimaran design, while odd-numbered ships are based on a competing design, the conventional monohull Freedom-class littoral combat ship. The initial order of littoral combat ships involved a total of four ships, including two of the Independence-class design. On 29 December 2010, the Navy announced that it was awarding Austal USA a contract to build ten additional Independence-class littoral combat ships.

== Construction and career ==
Augusta was built in Mobile, Alabama by Austal USA. Austal USA delivered the ship to the Navy, in Mobile on 12 May 2023. She joined the active fleet with a commissioning ceremony in Eastport, Maine on 30 September 2023. Augusta arrived at her homeport of San Diego on 30 October 2023.

The U.S. Navy announced that USS Augusta (LCS-34) "...will undergo a $33.5 million overhaul at a San Diego shipyard", investigating potential for hull cracks and propulsion system problems frequently experienced by this class of small surface combatant ships.
