= USS Kansas City (LCS-22) =

Independence-class littoral combat ship

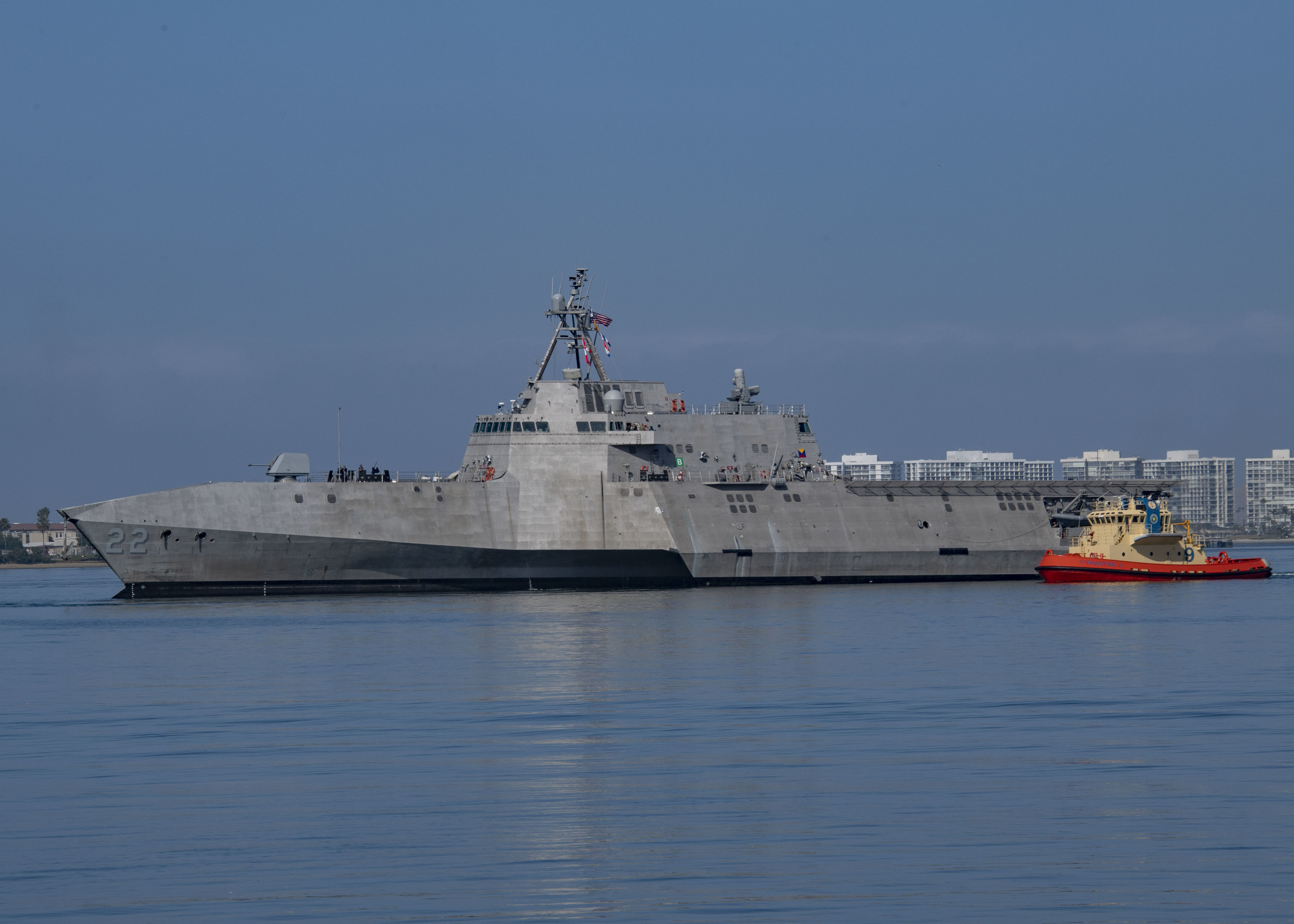
- USS Kansas City in San Diego on 24 May 2020

History

United States
- Name: Kansas City
- Namesake: Greater Kansas City Area
- Awarded: 29 December 2010
- Builder: Austal USA
- Laid down: 15 November 2017
- Launched: 19 October 2018
- Sponsored by: Tracy Davidson
- Christened: 22 September 2018
- Acquired: 12 February 2020
- Commissioned: 20 June 2020
- Home port: San Diego
- Identification: MMSI number: 368872000; Hull number: LCS-22
- Motto: United We Stand, Divided We Fall
- Status: Active
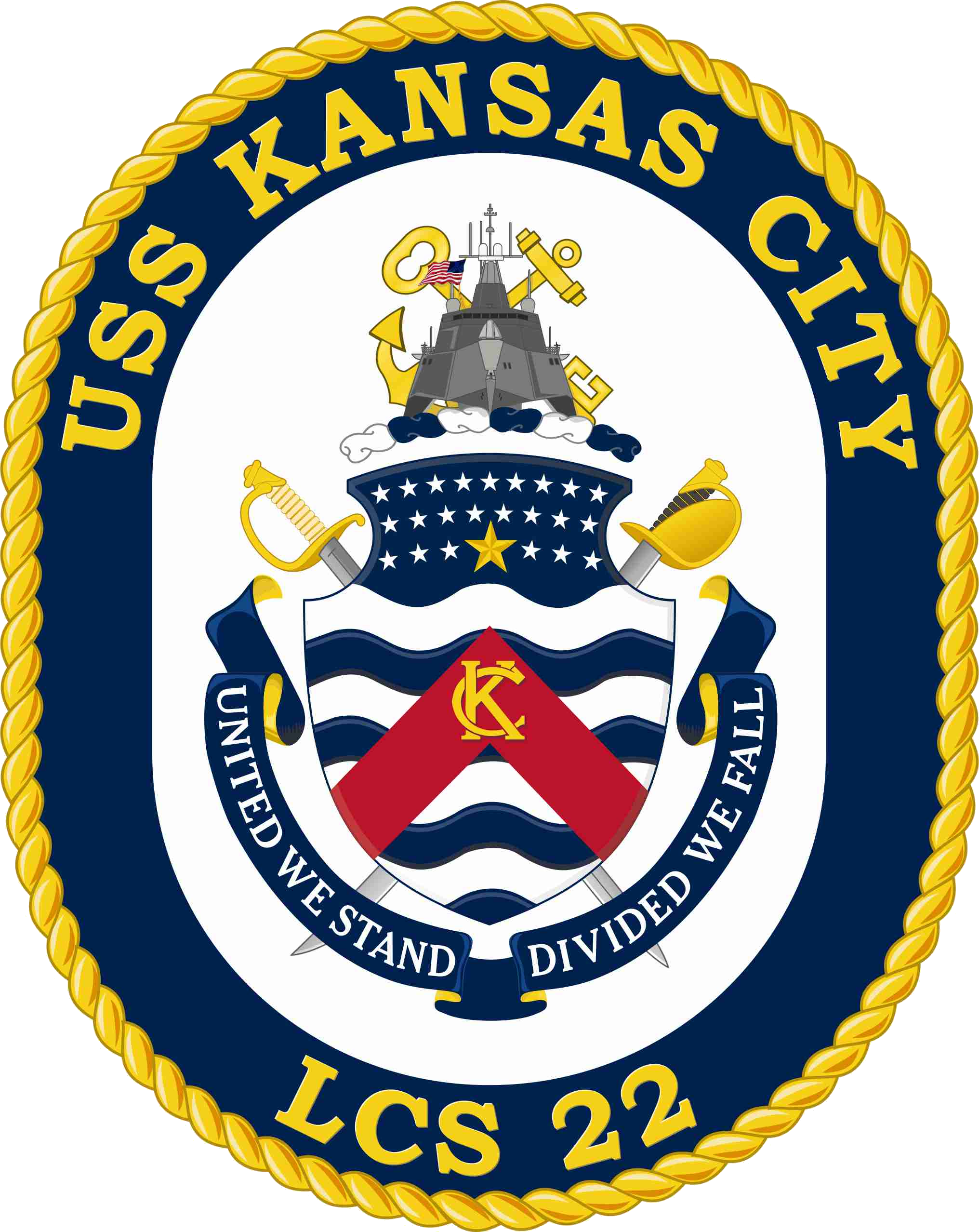
- Badge

General characteristics
- Class & type: Independence-class littoral combat ship
- Displacement: 2,307 metric tons light, 3,104 metric tons full, 797 metric tons deadweight
- Length: 127.4 m (418 ft)
- Beam: 31.6 m (104 ft)
- Draft: 14 ft (4.27 m)
- Propulsion: 2× gas turbines, 2× diesel, 4× waterjets, retractable Azimuth thruster, 4× diesel generators
- Speed: 40 knots (74 km/h; 46 mph)+, 47 knots (54 mph; 87 km/h) sprint
- Range: 4,300 nautical miles (8,000 km; 4,900 mi) at 20 knots (37 km/h; 23 mph)+
- Capacity: 210 tonnes
- Complement: 41 core crew (9 officers, 32 enlisted) plus up to 35 mission crew
- Sensors & processing systems: Sea Giraffe 3D Surface/Air RADAR; Bridgemaster-E Navigational RADAR; AN/KAX-2 EO/IR sensor for GFC
- Electronic warfare & decoys: EDO ES-3601 ESM; 4× SRBOC rapid bloom chaff launchers
- Armament: BAE Systems Mk 110 57 mm gun; 4× .50 cal (12.7 mm) guns (2 aft, 2 forward); Evolved SeaRAM 11 cell missile launcher; Mission modules
- Aircraft carried: 2× MH-60R/S Seahawks

USS Kansas City (LCS-22) is an Independence-class littoral combat ship of the United States Navy. She is the third ship to be named for Kansas City.

== Design ==
In 2002, the United States Navy initiated a program to develop the first of a fleet of littoral combat ships. The Navy initially ordered two trimaran hulled ships from General Dynamics, which became known as the Independence-class littoral combat ship after the first ship of the class, USS Independence. Even-numbered U.S. Navy littoral combat ships are built using the Independence-class trimaran design, while odd-numbered ships are based on a competing design, the conventional monohull Freedom-class littoral combat ship. The initial order of littoral combat ships involved a total of four ships, including two of the Independence-class design. On 29 December 2010, the Navy announced that it was awarding Austal USA a contract to build ten additional Independence-class littoral combat ships.

== Construction and career ==
Kansas City was built in Mobile, Alabama by Austal USA. The ship was christened on 22 September 2018 in Mobile, Alabama, and sponsored by Tracy Davidson, wife of Admiral Philip S. Davidson. She was launched 19 October 2018 into the Mobile River.

Kansas City was commissioned on 20 June 2020 and she has been assigned to Littoral Combat Ship Squadron One.
