= USS Kingsville =

Independence-class littoral combat ship of the United States Navy

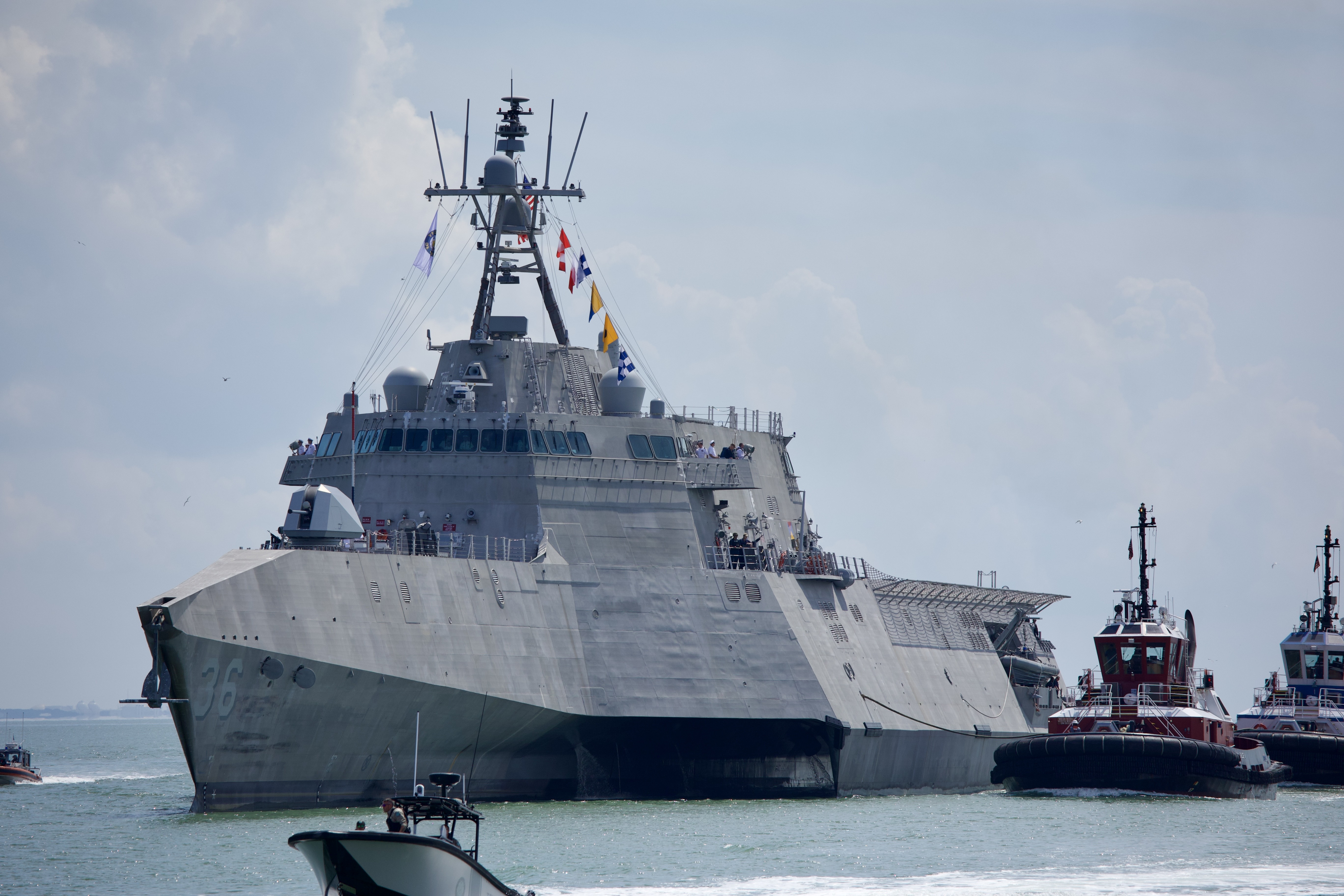
- Commissioning of USS Kingsville at the Port of Corpus Christi in Texas.

History

United States
- Name: Kingsville
- Namesake: Kingsville
- Awarded: 14 December 2018
- Builder: Austal USA
- Laid down: 23 February 2022
- Launched: 23 March 2023
- Sponsored by: Katherine L. Kline
- Christened: 22 April 2023
- Acquired: 1 March 2024
- Commissioned: 24 August 2024
- Home port: San Diego
- Identification: Hull number: LCS-36
- Motto: Tough and Competent
- Status: In active service
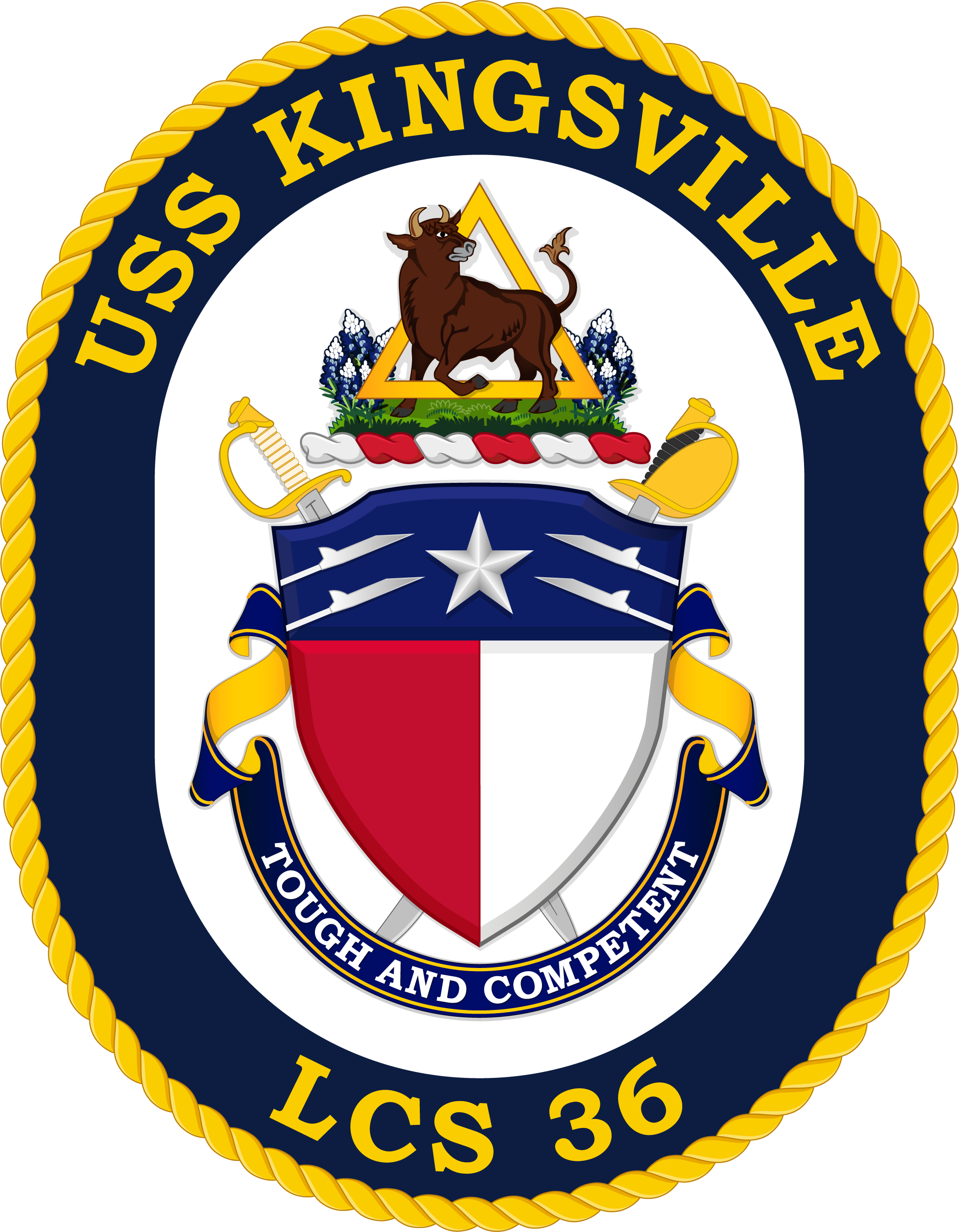
- Badge

General characteristics
- Class & type: Independence-class littoral combat ship
- Displacement: 2,307 metric tons light, 3,104 metric tons full, 797 metric tons deadweight
- Length: 127.4 m (418 ft)
- Beam: 31.6 m (104 ft)
- Draft: 14 ft (4.27 m)
- Propulsion: 2× gas turbines, 2× diesel, 4× waterjets, retractable Azimuth thruster, 4× diesel generators
- Speed: 40 knots (74 km/h; 46 mph)+, 47 knots (54 mph; 87 km/h) sprint
- Range: 4,300 nautical miles (8,000 km; 4,900 mi) at 20 knots (37 km/h; 23 mph)+
- Capacity: 210 tonnes
- Complement: 40 core crew (8 officers, 32 enlisted) plus up to 35 mission crew
- Sensors & processing systems: Sea Giraffe 3D Surface/Air RADAR; Bridgemaster-E Navigational RADAR; AN/KAX-2 EO/IR sensor for GFC
- Electronic warfare & decoys: EDO ES-3601 ESM; 4× SRBOC rapid bloom chaff launchers
- Armament: BAE Systems Mk 110 57 mm gun; 4× .50 cal (12.7 mm) guns (2 aft, 2 forward); Evolved SeaRAM 11 cell missile launcher; Mission modules
- Aircraft carried: 2× MH-60R/S Seahawks

USS Kingsville (LCS-36) is an Independence-class littoral combat ship of the United States Navy. She is the first ship to be named for Kingsville, Texas, which is home to Naval Air Station Kingsville.

== Design ==
In 2002, the United States Navy initiated a program to develop the first of a fleet of littoral combat ships. The Navy initially ordered two trimaran hulled ships from General Dynamics, which became known as the Independence-class littoral combat ship after the first ship of the class, USS Independence. Even-numbered US Navy littoral combat ships are built using the Independence-class trimaran design, while odd-numbered ships are based on a competing design, the conventional monohull Freedom-class littoral combat ship. The initial order of littoral combat ships involved a total of four ships, including two of the Independence-class design. On 29 December 2010, the Navy announced that it was awarding Austal USA a contract to build ten additional Independence-class littoral combat ships. The Kingsville is designed to travel upwards of 45mph, making it one of the fastest vessels in the navy.

== Construction and career ==
Kingsville was constructed in Mobile, Alabama by Austal USA. The Navy accepted delivery of the vessel on 1 March 2024 and it was commissioned in Corpus Christi, Texas on August 24, 2024. After commissioning, she traveled to her homeport of San Diego, California.
