= USS Cincinnati (LCS-20) =

Littoral combat ship of the United States Navy

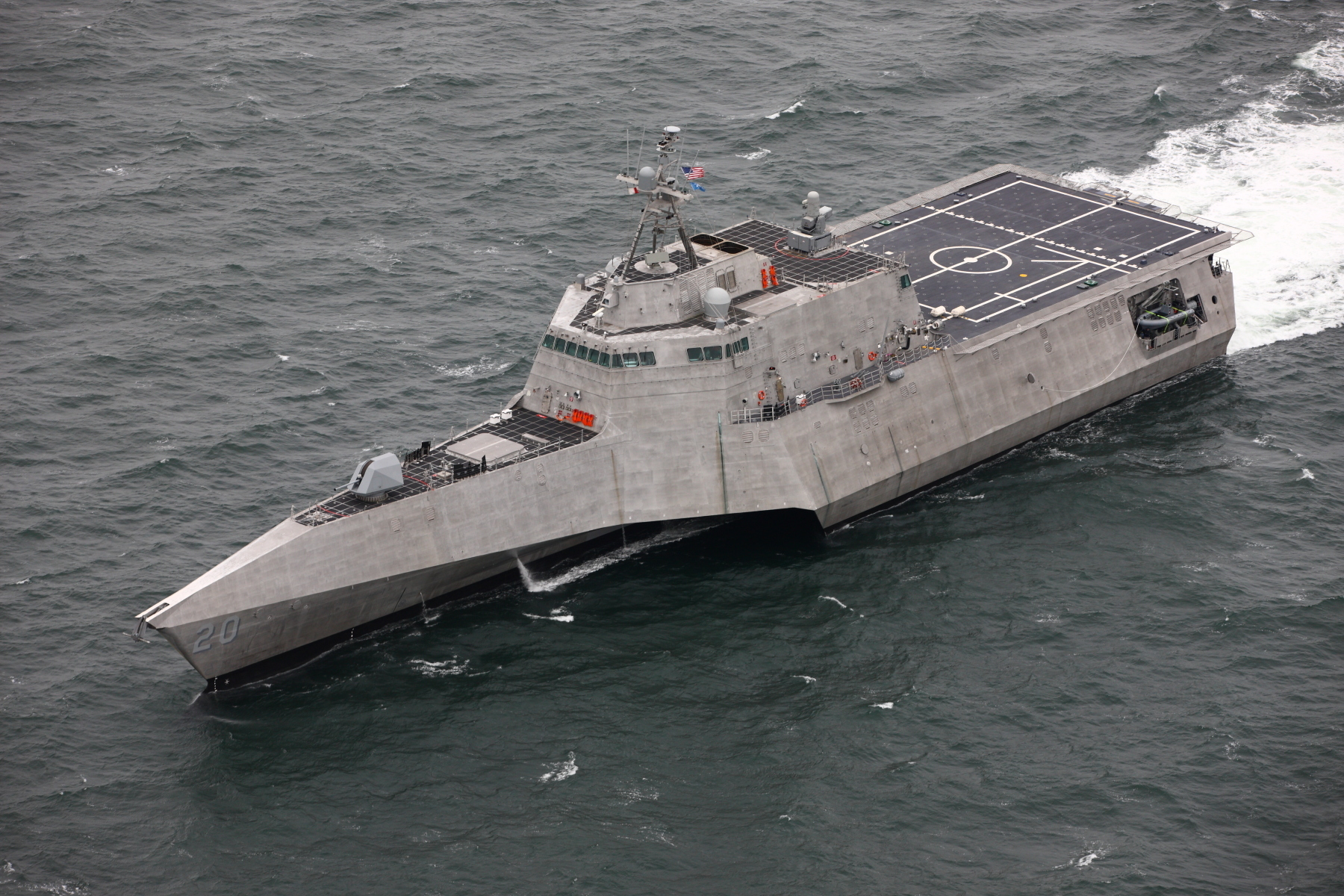
- USS Cincinnati in the Gulf of Mexico on 10 February 2019

History

United States
- Name: Cincinnati
- Namesake: Cincinnati
- Awarded: 29 December 2010
- Builder: Austal USA
- Laid down: 10 April 2017
- Launched: 22 May 2018
- Sponsored by: Penny Pritzker
- Christened: 6 May 2018
- Acquired: 21 June 2019
- Commissioned: 5 October 2019
- Home port: San Diego
- Identification: MMSI number: 368926; Hull number: LCS-20
- Motto: Strength in Unity
- Status: Active
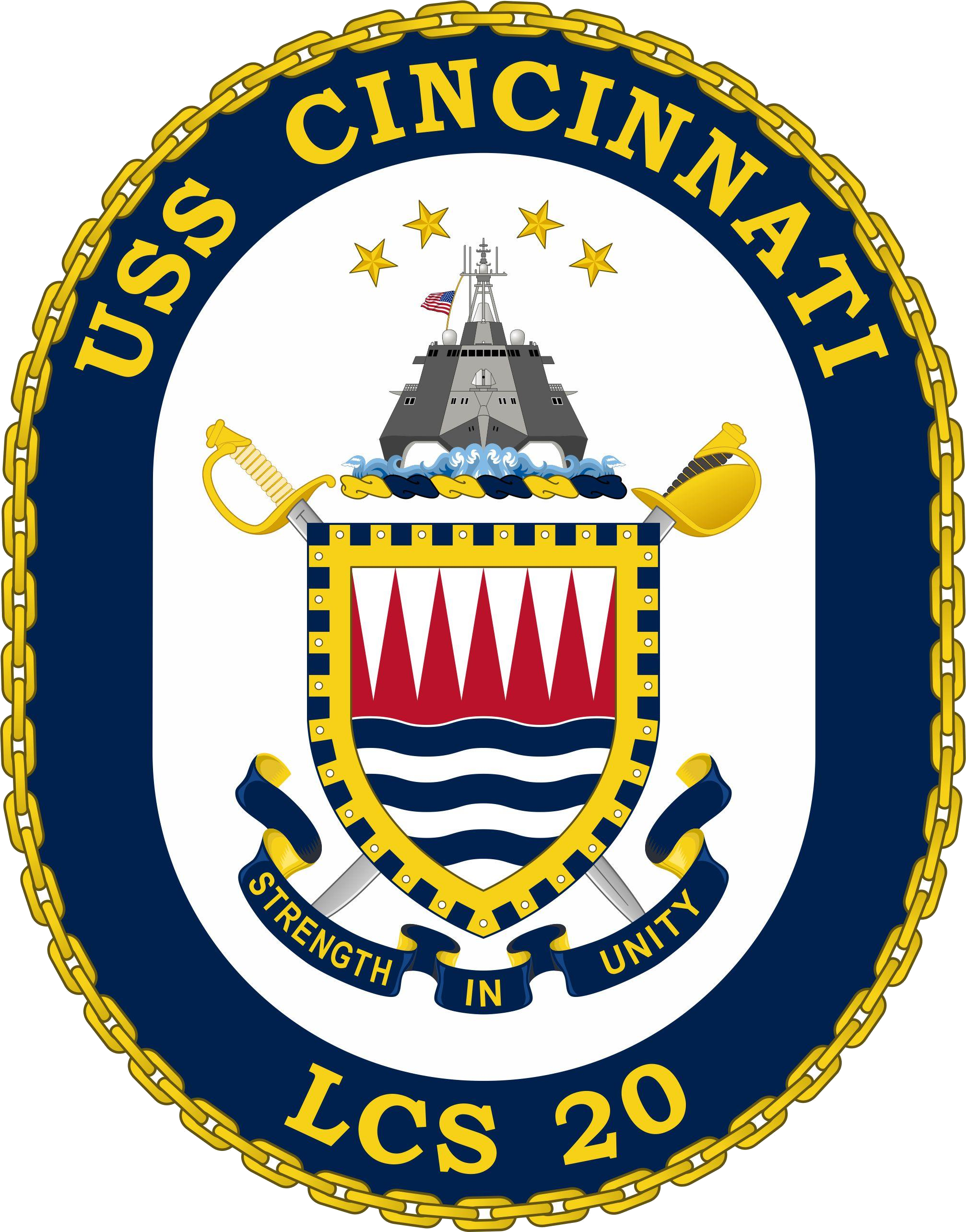
- Badge

General characteristics
- Class & type: Independence-class littoral combat ship
- Displacement: 2,307 metric tons light, 3,104 metric tons full, 797 metric tons deadweight
- Length: 127.4 m (418 ft)
- Beam: 31.6 m (104 ft)
- Draft: 14 ft (4.27 m)
- Propulsion: 2× gas turbines, 2× diesel, 4× waterjets, retractable Azimuth thruster, 4× diesel generators
- Speed: 40 knots (74 km/h; 46 mph)+, 47 knots (54 mph; 87 km/h) sprint
- Range: 4,300 nautical miles (8,000 km; 4,900 mi) at 20 knots (37 km/h; 23 mph)+
- Capacity: 210 tonnes
- Complement: 40 core crew (8 officers, 32 enlisted) plus up to 35 mission crew
- Sensors & processing systems: Sea Giraffe 3D Surface/Air RADAR; Bridgemaster-E Navigational RADAR; AN/KAX-2 EO/IR sensor for GFC
- Electronic warfare & decoys: EDO ES-3601 ESM; 4× SRBOC rapid bloom chaff launchers
- Armament: BAE Systems Mk 110 57 mm gun; 4× .50 cal (12.7 mm) guns (2 aft, 2 forward); Evolved SeaRAM 11 cell missile launcher; Mission modules
- Aircraft carried: 2× MH-60R/S Seahawks

USS Cincinnati (LCS-20) is an Independence-class littoral combat ship of the United States Navy. She is the fifth ship to be named after Cincinnati, Ohio.

== Design ==
In 2002, the United States Navy initiated a program to develop the first of a fleet of littoral combat ships. The Navy initially ordered two trimaran hulled ships from General Dynamics, which became known as the Independence-class littoral combat ship after the first ship of the class, USS Independence. Even-numbered U.S. Navy littoral combat ships are built using the Independence-class trimaran design, while odd-numbered ships are based on a competing design, the conventional monohull Freedom-class littoral combat ship. The initial order of littoral combat ships involved a total of four ships, including two of the Independence-class design. On 29 December 2010, the Navy announced that it was awarding Austal USA a contract to build ten additional Independence-class littoral combat ships. Cincinnati has a crew of up to 40 sailors and can hold two MH-60R/S Seahawk helicopters.

== Construction and career ==
Cincinnati was christened on 7 May 2018 by former Secretary of Commerce Penny Pritzker and commissioned on 5 October 2019. She has been assigned to Littoral Combat Ship Squadron One. Cincinnati is currently stationed in San Diego, CA.

== Awards ==
- Battle "E" – (2019)
