= USS Manchester (LCS-14) =

Independence-class littoral combat ship of the United States Navy

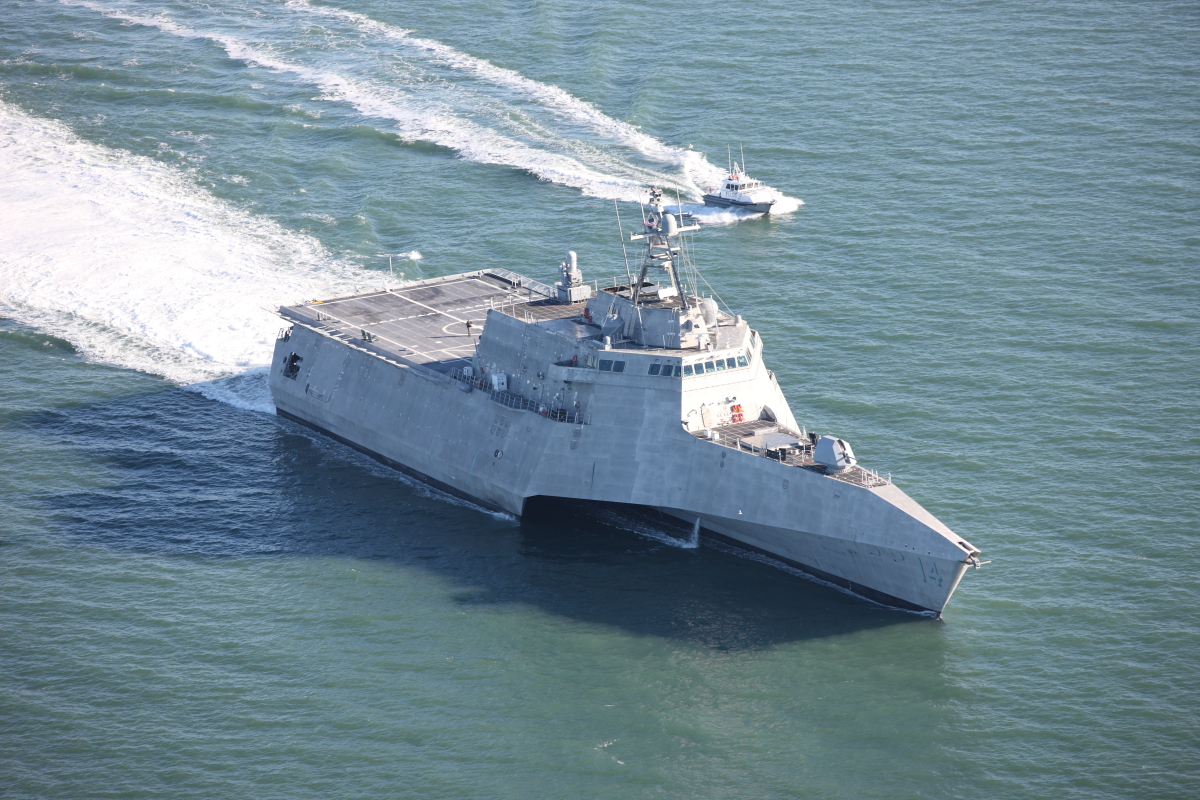
- USS Manchester on 5 December 2017

History

United States
- Name: Manchester
- Namesake: Manchester
- Awarded: 29 December 2010
- Builder: Austal USA
- Laid down: 29 June 2015
- Launched: 12 May 2016
- Sponsored by: Jeanne Shaheen
- Christened: 7 May 2016
- Acquired: 28 February 2018
- Commissioned: 26 May 2018
- Home port: San Diego
- Motto: Labor Vincit; (Work Wins)
- Status: Active
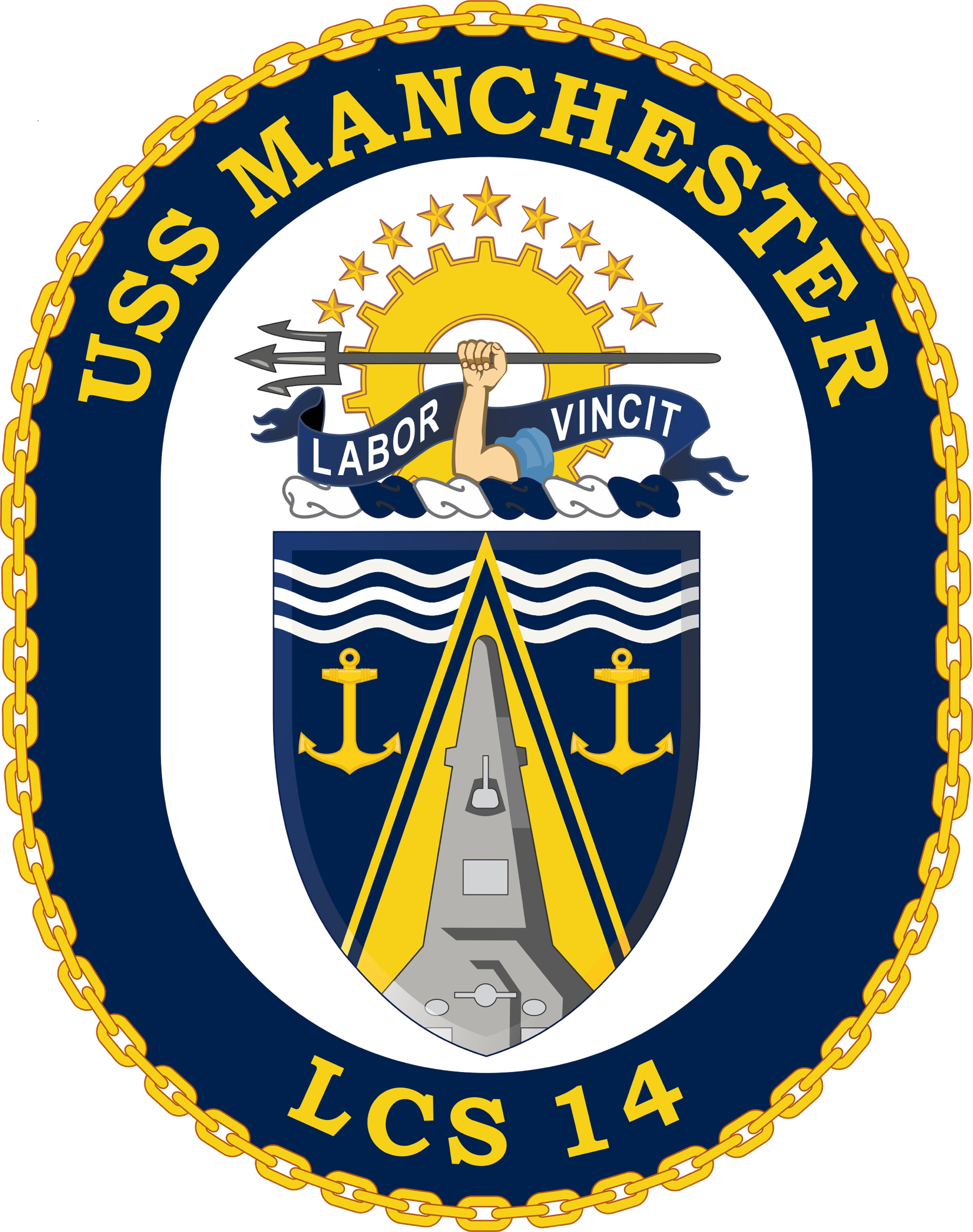
- Badge

General characteristics
- Class & type: Independence-class littoral combat ship
- Displacement: 2,307 metric tons light, 3,104 metric tons full, 797 metric tons deadweight
- Length: 127.4 m (418 ft)
- Beam: 31.6 m (104 ft)
- Draft: 14 ft (4.27 m)
- Propulsion: 2× gas turbines, 2× diesel, 4× waterjets, retractable Azimuth thruster, 4× diesel generators
- Speed: 40 knots (74 km/h; 46 mph)+, 47 knots (54 mph; 87 km/h) sprint
- Range: 4,300 nautical miles (8,000 km; 4,900 mi) at 20 knots (37 km/h; 23 mph)+
- Capacity: 210 tonnes
- Complement: 53 core crew (11 officers, 42 enlisted) plus up to 35 mission crew
- Sensors & processing systems: Sea Giraffe 3D Surface/Air RADAR; Bridgemaster-E Navigational RADAR; AN/KAX-2 EO/IR sensor for GFC
- Electronic warfare & decoys: EDO ES-3601 ESM; 4× SRBOC rapid bloom chaff launchers
- Armament: BAE Systems Mk 110 57 mm gun; 4× .50 cal (12.7 mm) guns (2 aft, 2 forward); Evolved SeaRAM 11 cell missile launcher; Mission modules
- Aircraft carried: 2× MH-60R/S Seahawks

USS Manchester (LCS-14) is an Independence-class littoral combat ship in the United States Navy. She is the second ship to be named for Manchester, New Hampshire.

== Design ==
In 2002, the United States Navy initiated a program to develop the first of a fleet of littoral combat ships. The Navy initially ordered two trimaran hulled ships from General Dynamics, which became known as the Independence-class littoral combat ship after the first ship of the class, USS Independence. Even-numbered U.S. Navy littoral combat ships are built using the Independence-class trimaran design, while odd-numbered ships are based on a competing design, the conventional monohull Freedom-class littoral combat ship. The initial order of littoral combat ships involved a total of four ships, including two of the Independence-class design. On 29 December 2010, the Navy announced that it was awarding Austal USA a contract to build ten additional Independence-class littoral combat ships.

== Construction and career ==
The ship's keel was laid on 29 June 2015, at Mobile, Alabama. The initials of New Hampshire senator Jeanne Shaheen, the ship's sponsor, were welded into the hull of Manchester during the traditional keel laying ceremony. Manchester was christened on 7 May 2016 and she was launched on 12 May 2016. Manchester was commissioned on 26 May 2018.

She is assigned to Littoral Combat Ship Squadron One.

From March 2023 to 26 August 2023 a clandestine Wi-Fi network was operated for the benefit of the chiefs mess using a Starlink satellite dish.

== Awards ==
- Battle "E" – (2019)
