= USS Savannah (LCS-28) =

Littoral combat ship of the United States Navy

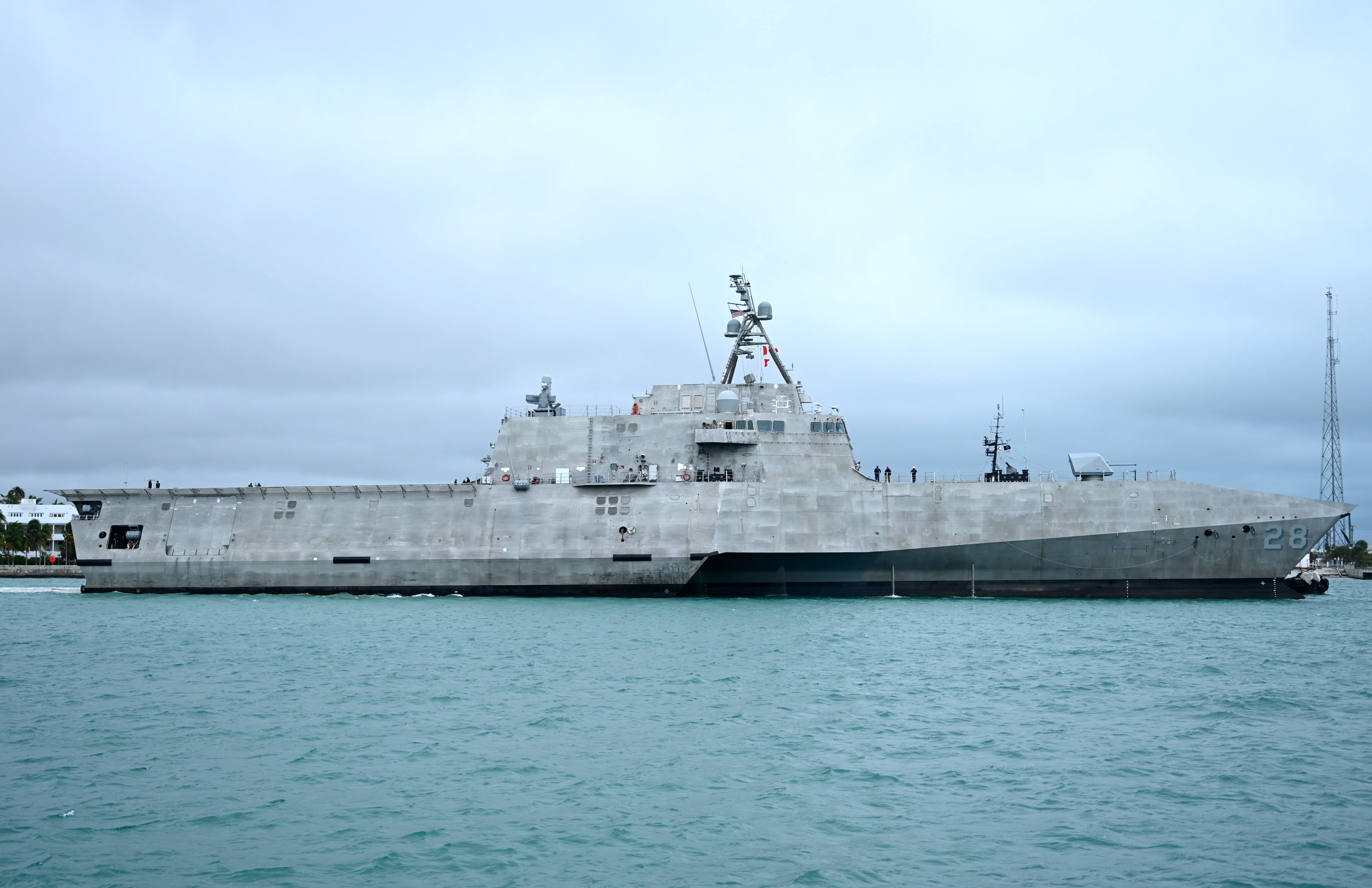
- Savannah on 9 February 2022

History

United States
- Name: Savannah
- Namesake: Savannah
- Awarded: 23 June 2017
- Builder: Austal USA
- Laid down: 20 September 2019
- Launched: 3 September 2020
- Sponsored by: Dianne Isakson
- Christened: 29 August 2020
- Acquired: 25 June 2021
- Commissioned: 5 February 2022
- Home port: San Diego
- Identification: Hull number: LCS-28
- Motto: Not for Self, but for Others
- Status: Active
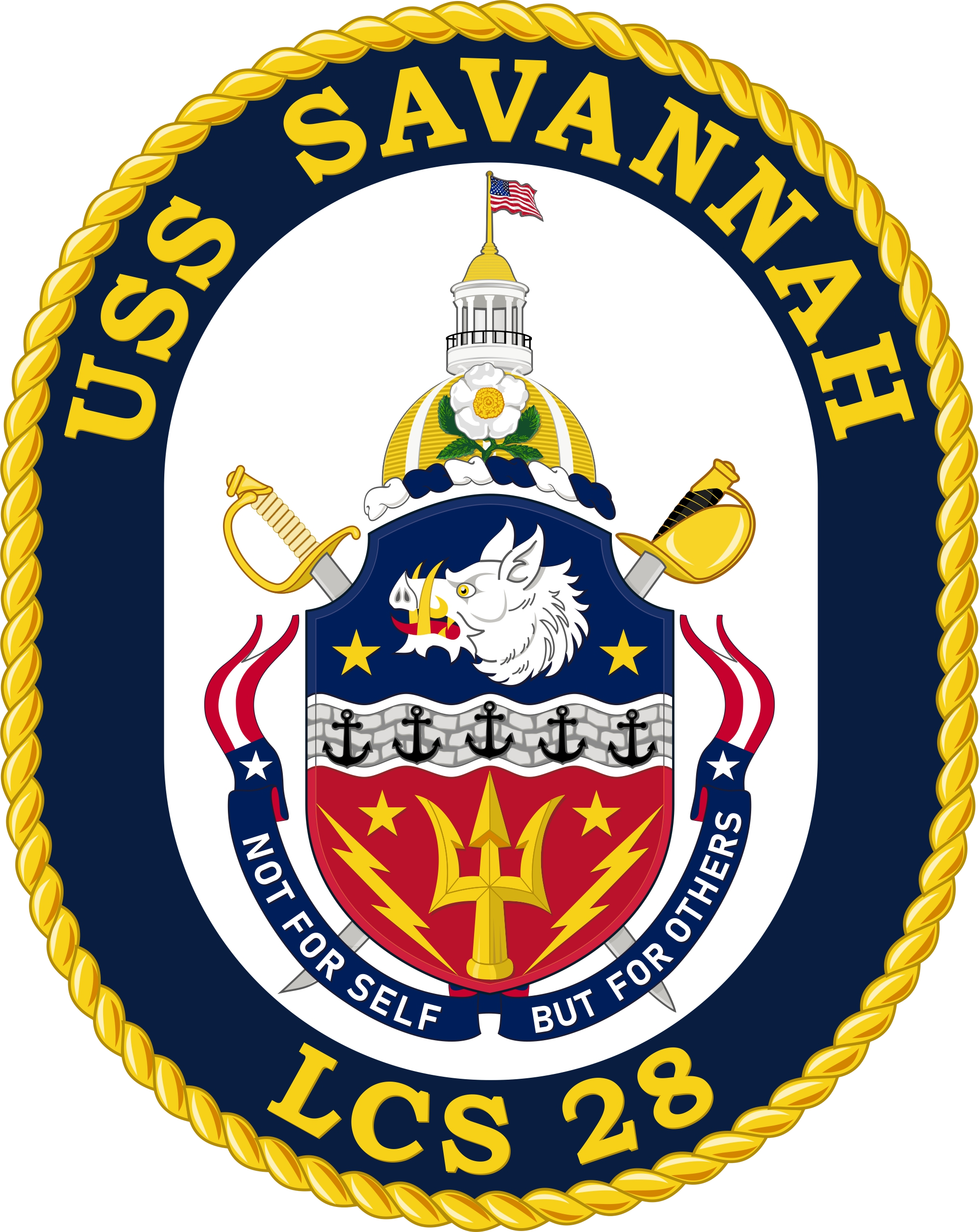
- Badge

General characteristics
- Class & type: Independence-class littoral combat ship
- Displacement: 2,307 metric tons light, 3,104 metric tons full, 797 metric tons deadweight
- Length: 127.4 m (418 ft)
- Beam: 31.6 m (104 ft)
- Draft: 14 ft (4.27 m)
- Propulsion: 2× gas turbines, 2× diesel, 4× waterjets, retractable Azimuth thruster, 4× diesel generators
- Speed: 40 knots (74 km/h; 46 mph)+, 47 knots (54 mph; 87 km/h) sprint
- Range: 4,300 nautical miles (8,000 km; 4,900 mi) at 20 knots (37 km/h; 23 mph)+
- Capacity: 210 tonnes
- Complement: 40 core crew (8 officers, 32 enlisted) plus up to 35 mission crew
- Sensors & processing systems: Sea Giraffe 3D Surface/Air RADAR; Bridgemaster-E Navigational RADAR; AN/KAX-2 EO/IR sensor for GFC
- Electronic warfare & decoys: EDO ES-3601 ESM; 4× SRBOC rapid bloom chaff launchers
- Armament: BAE Systems Mk 110 57 mm gun; 4× .50 cal (12.7 mm) guns (2 aft, 2 forward); Evolved SeaRAM 11 cell missile launcher; Mission modules
- Aircraft carried: 2× MH-60R/S Seahawks

USS Savannah (LCS-28) is an Independence-class littoral combat ship of the United States Navy. She is the sixth ship to be named Savannah.

== Design ==
In 2002, the United States Navy initiated a program to develop the first of a fleet of littoral combat ships. The Navy initially ordered two trimaran hulled ships from General Dynamics, which became known as the Independence-class littoral combat ship after the first ship of the class, USS Independence. Even-numbered US Navy littoral combat ships are built using the Independence-class trimaran design, while odd-numbered ships are based on a competing design, the conventional monohull Freedom-class littoral combat ship. The initial order of littoral combat ships involved a total of four ships, including two of the Independence-class design. On 29 December 2010, the Navy announced that it was awarding Austal USA a contract to build ten additional Independence-class littoral combat ships.

== Construction and career ==
Savannah was built in Mobile, Alabama by Austal USA. Austal delivered Savannah to the Navy, in Mobile on 28 June 2021. Savannah was commissioned on 5 February 2022 in Brunswick, Georgia before sailing to her new home port in San Diego, California.
