= USS Charleston (LCS-18) =

Independence-class littoral combat ship of the United States Navy

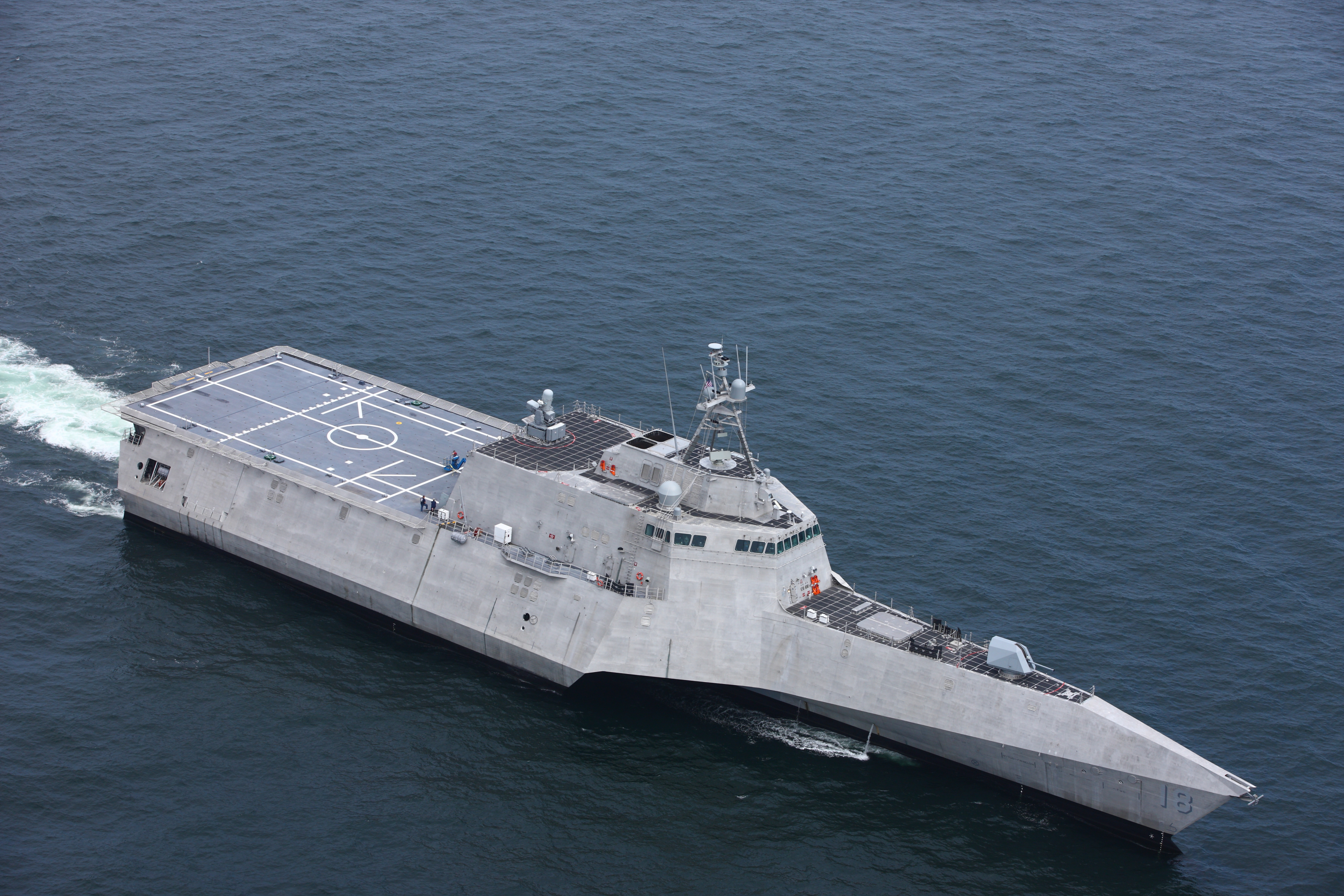
- USS Charleston on 18 July 2018

History

United States
- Name: Charleston
- Namesake: Charleston
- Awarded: 29 December 2010
- Builder: Austal USA
- Laid down: 28 June 2016
- Launched: 14 September 2017
- Sponsored by: Bradley Byrne and Charlotte Riley
- Christened: 26 August 2017
- Acquired: 31 August 2018
- Commissioned: 2 March 2019
- Home port: San Diego
- Identification: MMSI number: 368926271; Hull number: LCS-18
- Motto: While We Breathe, We Fight
- Status: Active
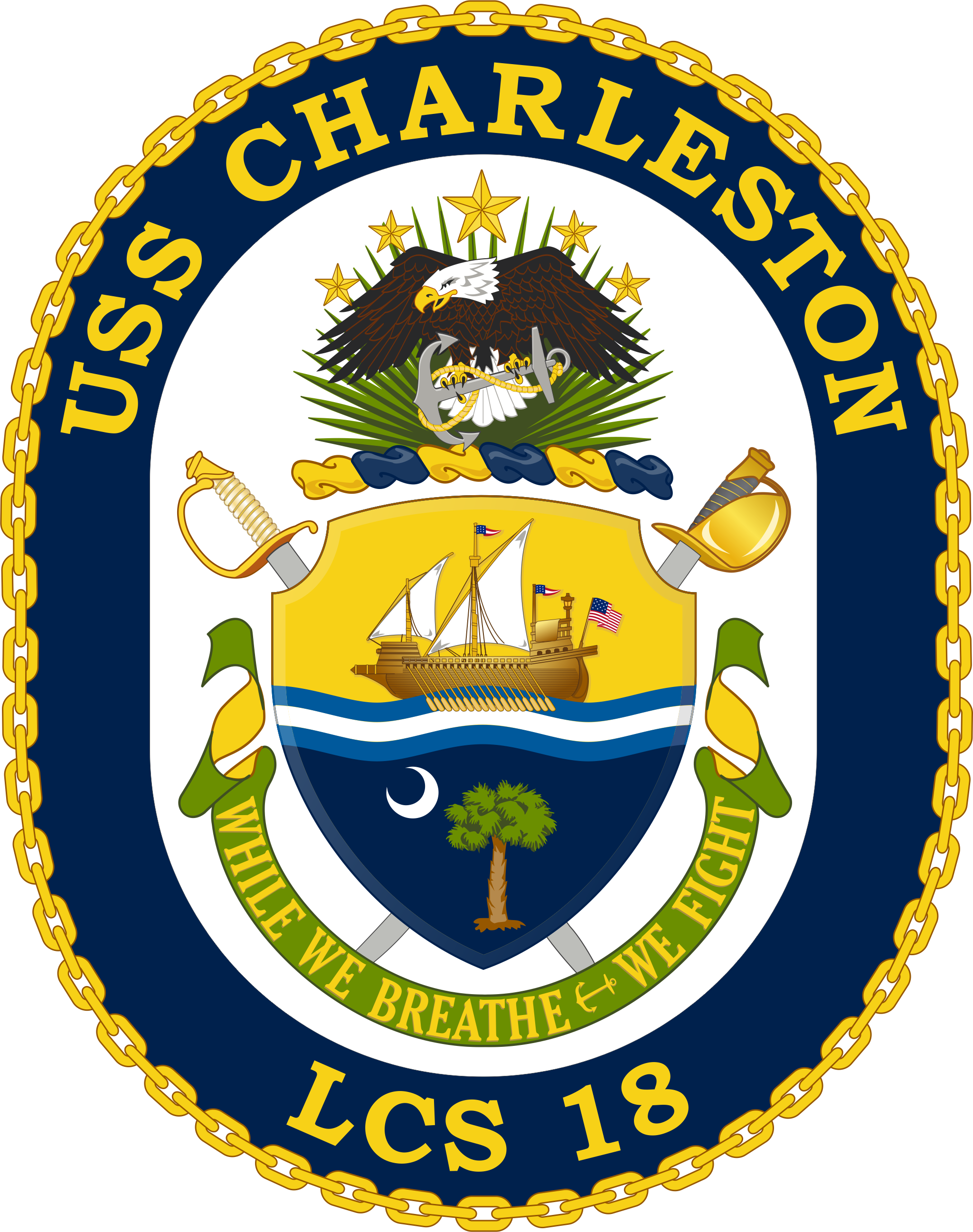
- Badge

General characteristics
- Class & type: Independence-class littoral combat ship
- Displacement: 2,307 metric tons light, 3,104 metric tons full, 797 metric tons deadweight
- Length: 127.4 m (418 ft)
- Beam: 31.6 m (104 ft)
- Draft: 14 ft (4.27 m)
- Propulsion: 2× gas turbines, 2× diesel, 4× waterjets, retractable Azimuth thruster, 4× diesel generators
- Speed: 40 knots (74 km/h; 46 mph)+, 47 knots (54 mph; 87 km/h) sprint
- Range: 4,300 nautical miles (8,000 km; 4,900 mi) at 20 knots (37 km/h; 23 mph)+
- Capacity: 210 tonnes
- Complement: 40 core crew (8 officers, 32 enlisted) plus up to 35 mission crew
- Sensors & processing systems: Sea Giraffe 3D Surface/Air RADAR; Bridgemaster-E Navigational RADAR; AN/KAX-2 EO/IR sensor for GFC
- Electronic warfare & decoys: EDO ES-3601 ESM; 4× SRBOC rapid bloom chaff launchers
- Armament: BAE Systems Mk 110 57 mm gun; 4× .50 cal (12.7 mm) guns (2 aft, 2 forward); Evolved SeaRAM 11 cell missile launcher; Mission modules
- Aircraft carried: 2× MH-60R/S Seahawks

USS Charleston (LCS-18) is an Independence-class littoral combat ship of the United States Navy. She is the sixth ship to be named for Charleston, the oldest and largest city in the U.S. state of South Carolina.

== Design ==
In 2002, the United States Navy initiated a program to develop the first of a fleet of littoral combat ships. The Navy initially ordered two trimaran hulled ships from General Dynamics, which became known as the Independence-class littoral combat ship after the first ship of the class, USS Independence. Even-numbered U.S. Navy littoral combat ships are built using the Independence-class trimaran design, while odd-numbered ships are based on a competing design, the conventional monohull Freedom-class littoral combat ship. The initial order of littoral combat ships involved a total of four ships, including two of the Independence-class design. On 29 December 2010, the Navy announced that it was awarding Austal USA a contract to build ten additional Independence-class littoral combat ships.

== Construction and career ==
Charleston was built by Austal USA in Mobile, Alabama. A ceremonial laying of the keel was held at the Austal USA shipyards in Mobile on 28 June 2016. The ship's sponsor, U.S. Representative Bradley Byrne, welded his initials into the keel of Charleston as part of the ceremony.

Charleston was commissioned on 2 March 2019 and she has been assigned to Littoral Combat Ship Squadron One at her homeport of San Diego.

On 27 April 2021, an unmanned helicopter, a MQ-8 Fire Scout, took off from the ship at about 3:40 a.m. The aircraft, which is 31.7 feet long and roughly 10 feet tall, then crashed into the side of Charleston and was not recovered after falling into the sea. Despite damage to a safety net on the ship and a strike to the hull, Charleston was able to safely operate after the crash.
