= Independence-class littoral combat ship =

US Navy small coastal combat ships

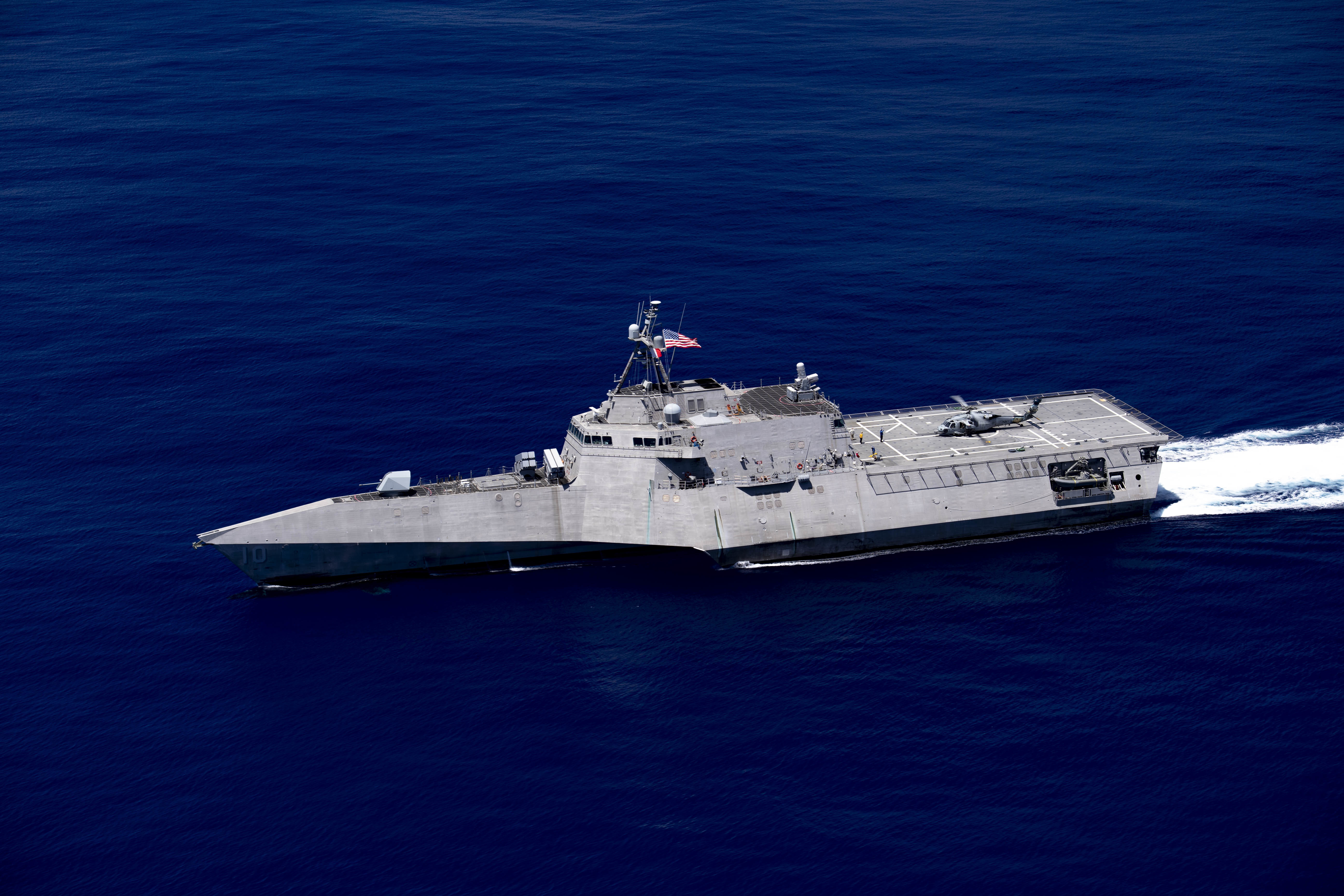
- USS Gabrielle Giffords in the Philippine Sea, October 2019

Class overview
- Name: Independence class
- Builders: Austal USA
- Operators: United States Navy
- Preceded by: N/A
- Succeeded by: Constellation class
- Cost: $360 million
- Built: 2008–2025
- In commission: 2010–present
- Planned: 19
- Completed: 19
- Active: 17
- Retired: 2

General characteristics
- Type: Littoral combat ship
- Displacement: 2,307 tons light, 3,104 tons full
- Length: 418 ft (127 m)
- Beam: 104 ft (32 m)
- Draft: 14 ft (4.3 m)
- Installed power: CODOG system; 2 × General Electric LM2500 gas turbines; 2 × MTU Friedrichshafen 20V 8000 Series diesel engines; 4 × diesel generators
- Propulsion: 2 × American Vulkan light weight multiple-section carbon fiber propulsion shaftlines; 4 × Wärtsilä waterjets; 2 × LJ150E; 2 × LJ160E; 2 × retractable bow-mounted azimuth thrusters
- Speed: 44 knots (51 mph; 81 km/h)
- Range: 4,300 nautical miles (7,964 km) at 18 knots (33 km/h)
- Capacity: 210 metric tons (206 long tons, 231 short tons)
- Complement: 40 core crew (8 officers, 32 enlisted) plus up to 35 mission crew
- Sensors & processing systems: SAAB AN/SPS-77(V)1 Sea GIRAFFE 3D air and surface search radar; Sperry Marine BridgeMaster E navigational radar; AN/KAX-2 electro-optical sensor with TV and FLIR; Northrop Grumman ICMS (Integrated Combat Management System)
- Electronic warfare & decoys: ITT Corporation ES-3601 ESM system; 4 × SRBOC decoy launchers for chaff and infrared decoys; BAE Systems Nulka active radar decoy system
- Armament: 1 × BAE Systems Mk 110 57 mm gun; 1 × Raytheon SeaRAM CIWS; 4 × .50-cal guns (2 aft, 2 forward); 2 × 30 mm Mk44 Bushmaster II guns (part of SUW module); 8 × RGM-184A Naval Strike Missiles; 24 × AGM-114L Hellfire missiles (SUW vertical launch module); Other weapons as part of mission modules
- Aircraft carried: 1 × MH-60R/S Seahawk; 2 × MQ-8B Fire Scouts or 1 × MQ-8C Fire Scout

The Independence class is a class of littoral combat ships built for the United States Navy.

The hull design evolved from a project at Austal to design a high speed, 40-knot (74 km/h; 46 mph) cruise ship. That hull design evolved into the high-speed trimaran ferry Benchijigua Express and the Independence class was then proposed by General Dynamics and Austal as a contender for Navy plans to build a fleet of smaller, agile, multipurpose warships to operate nearshore in the littoral zone. Initially two ships were approved, to compete with Lockheed Martin's Freedom-class design.

Despite initial plans to only build ships of the winner out of the two competing Independence or Freedom classes, in 2010 the Navy announced plans to order up to ten additional ships of each class, for a total 12 ships per class. In March 2016 the Navy announced their intention to order an additional two ships, increasing the order to 13 ships of each class.

It was announced in early September 2016 that the first four vessels of the LCS program would be used as test ships rather than being deployed with the fleet. This included lead ship Independence and Coronado. As of May 2019, nine ships had been commissioned. In February 2020 it was announced that the Navy plans to retire the first four LCS ships. On 20 June 2020, the US Navy announced that all four would be taken out of commission in March 2021, and placed in inactive reserve, because it would be too expensive to upgrade them to match the later ships in the class.

== Planning and construction ==
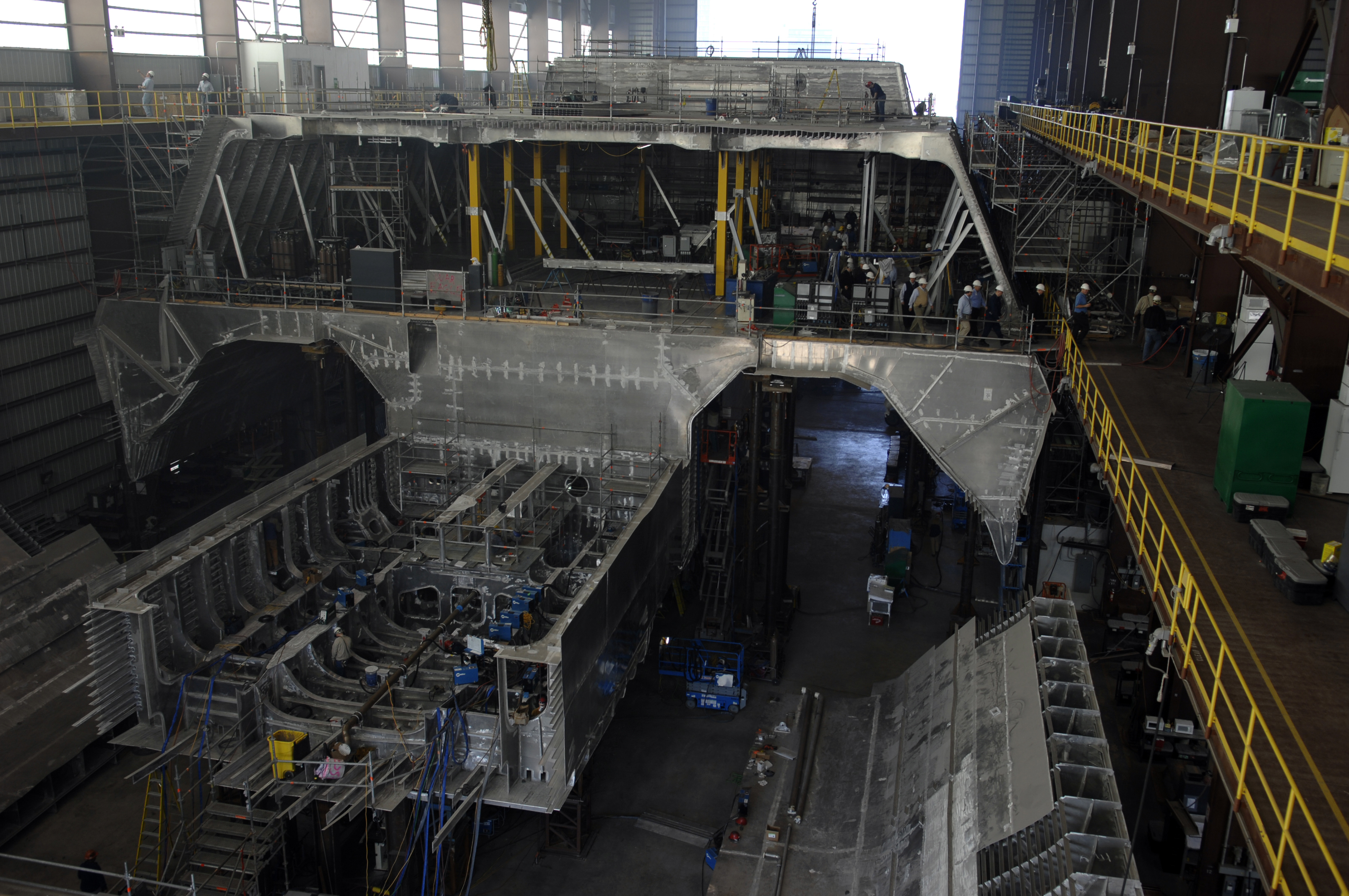
Independence under construction, 2007.

Planning for a class of smaller, agile, multipurpose warships to operate in the littoral zone began in the early 2000s. In July 2003, a proposal by General Dynamics (partnering with Austal USA, the American subsidiary of Australian shipbuilder Austal) was approved by the Navy, with a contract for two vessels. These would then be compared to two ships built by Lockheed Martin to determine which design would be taken up by the Navy for a production run of up to 55 ships.

The first ship, Independence was laid down at the Austal USA shipyard in Mobile, Alabama, on 19 January 2006. The planned second ship was cancelled in November 2007, but reordered in May 2009, and laid down in December of that year as Coronado, shortly before Independence was launched.

The development and construction of Independence as of June 2009 was running at more than 3 times budget. The total projected cost for the ship was $704 million. The Navy had originally projected the cost at $220 million. Independence began builder's trials in July 2009, three days behind schedule because of maintenance issues. A leak in the port gas turbine saw the order of trials altered, but builder's and acceptance trials were completed by November, and although her first INSURV inspection revealed 2,080 deficiencies, these were rectified in time for the ship to be handed over to the Navy in mid-December, and commissioned in mid-January 2010.

Navy leaders said that the fixed price competition offered the Austal design an equal shot, in spite of its excess size, cost and limited service. After much inconsistency on how testing and orders were to proceed, in November 2010, the Navy asked that Congress approve ten of each of the Independence and Freedom classes.

== Design ==
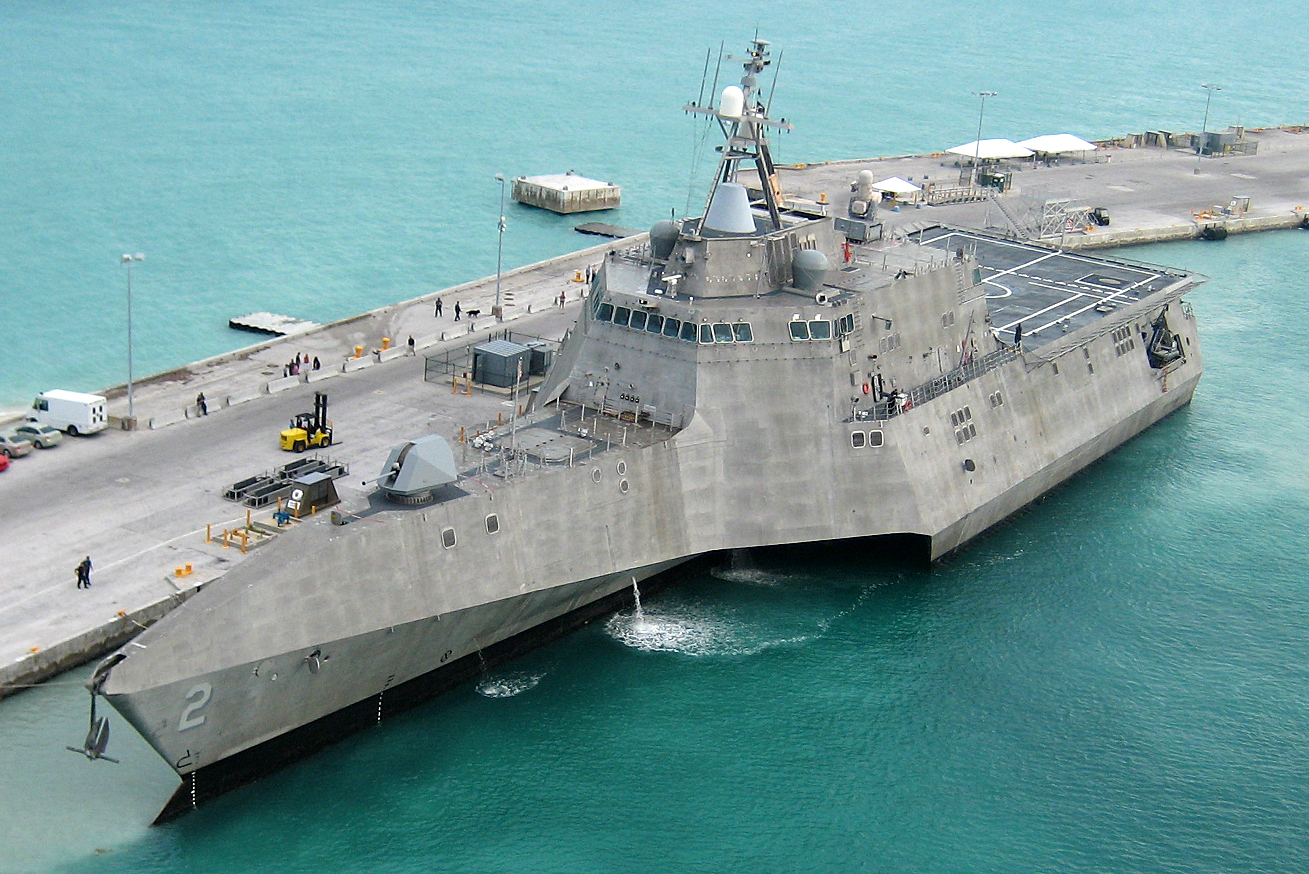
The trimaran design USS Independence

The Independence-class design began life at Austal as a platform for a high-speed cruise ship. The principal requirements of that project were speed, stability and passenger comfort, and Austal's team determined that the trimaran hull form offered significant passenger comfort and stability advantages over both a catamaran and a monohull. The high-speed cruise ship project evolved into Austal's commercial high-speed trimaran ferry Benchijigua Express.

The ships are 127.4 m (418 ft) long, with a beam of 31.6 m (104 ft), and a draft of 13 ft (3.96 m). Their displacement is rated at 2,377 tons light, 3,228 tons full, and 851 tons deadweight. The standard ship's company is 40, although this can increase depending on the ship's role with mission-specific personnel. The habitability area with bunks is located under the bridge. The helm is controlled by joysticks instead of traditional steering wheels.

The trimaran hull increases the total surface area but still allows for Independence-class to be able to reach sustainable speeds of about 50 knots (93 km/h; 58 mph), with a range of 10,000 nautical miles (19,000 km; 12,000 mi). Austal claims that the design will use a third less fuel than the competing Freedom class. Nontheless, the Congressional Budget Office found that fuel would account for 18 percent or less of the total lifetime cost of Freedom. The lack of bridge wings on the Independence class had been noted as the top problem in the entire LCS program to the extent that these will need to be retrofitted onto existing ships. The lightweight aluminum construction of the Independence-class ships makes them more vulnerable to damage than the Freedom-class ships.

The first ships of both LCS classes were delivered before the designs were mature so that improvements could be built into future ships. The Navy is improving the Independence class with bridge wings for safety and replacing the 5.1-metre (17 ft) Rigid Hull Inflatable Boat (RHIB) with a 7-metre (23 ft) boat. An improved cathodic protection system will enhance corrosion protection. Like the Freedom class, the Independence vessels will be getting axial flow water jets which pushes water parallel to the shaft of the impeller to improve efficiency and reduce maintenance; they will also be upgraded to handle the horsepower provided by the gas turbine propulsion system. A winch control system will modulate the motion of the anchor to reduce the reliance on manual hand brakes. The mission bay side door will be redesigned for reliability and the platform lift elevator reconfigured to better handle weapons and ordnance.

=== Mission modules ===
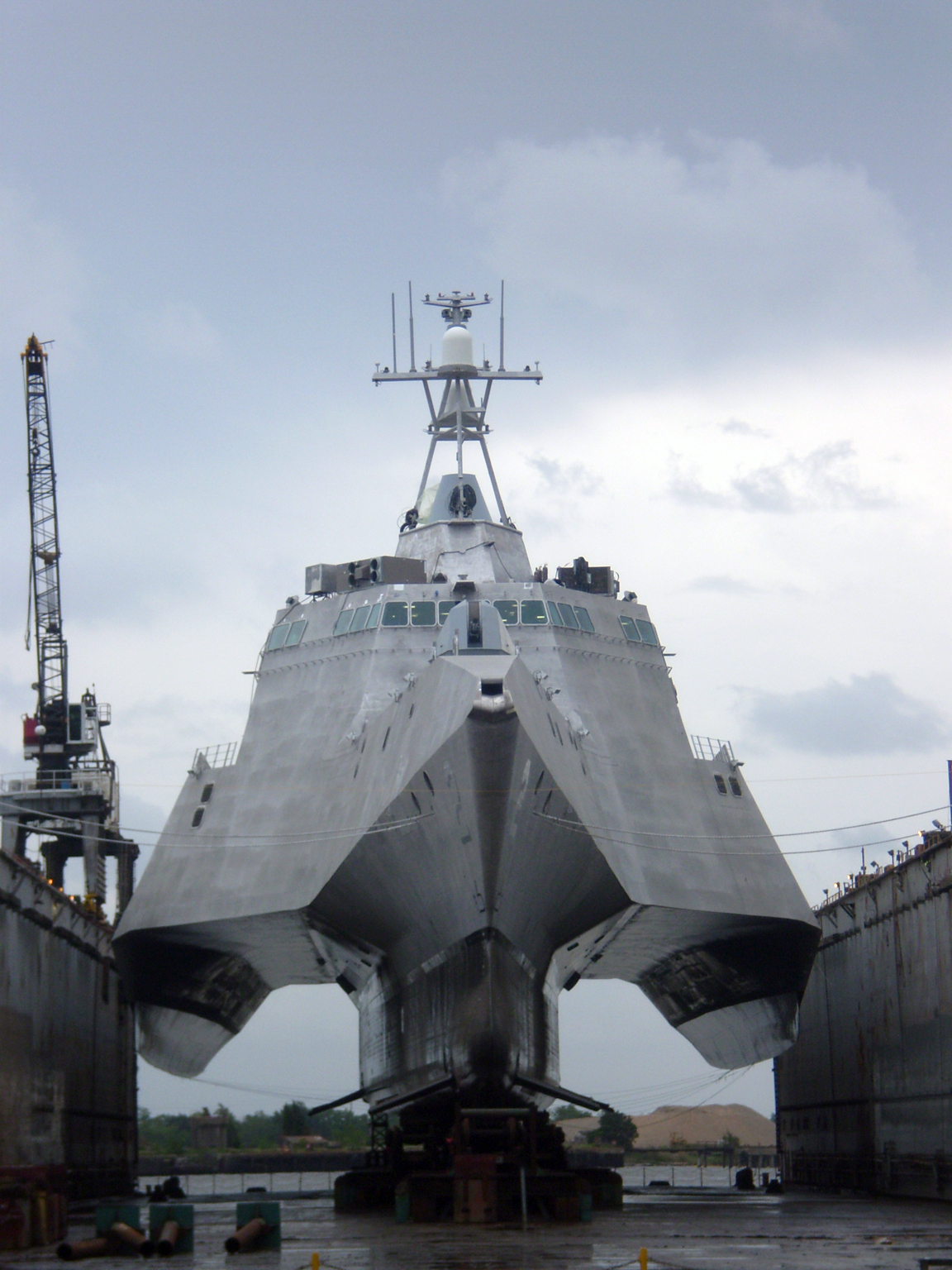
The Trimaran hull of an Independence-class LCS

The LCS is reconfigured for various roles by changing mission packages, each of which includes mission module equipment (weapon systems, sensors, etc.), carried craft and mission crews. Modules include Anti-submarine warfare (ASW), mine countermeasures (MCM), surface warfare (SUW), and special warfare missions. The MCM and SUW modules are planned to reach initial operating capability in Fiscal year 2014, and the ASW module in FY2016. Module changes were envisioned to allow a single LCS to change roles in a matter of hours at any commercial port allowing it to rapidly optimize effectiveness against a threat. A report from the Office of the Chief of Naval Operations (OPNAV) on a January 2012 sustainment wargame reportedly stated that, possibly for logistics reasons, the mission module changes may take as long as weeks, and that in the future the navy plans to use LCS ships with a single module, with module changes being a rare occurrence. In 2014, Independence switched from countermine to surface warfare modes in 96 hours on short notice.

In an 8 September 2016 announcement, the Navy revealed a radical change in operations and organization plans for the LCS. Of the 28 Flight 0 ships built or on order, the first four, two of each class, will be turned into training ships and the remaining 24 will be divided into six divisions of four ships each; three divisions of the Freedom class based at Naval Station Mayport, Florida and three divisions of the Independence class based at Naval Station San Diego, California. The new organization does away with the LCS' signature interchangeable mission module concept, with each division being tasked to fulfill one of the three mission sets. Crewing is also changed into a more simplified two-crew "blue/gold" model, like that used on submarines and minesweepers, where ships cycle to forward deployed locations with the two crews swapping roles every 4–5 months; aviation detachments will also deploy with the same LCS crew, creating an arrangement of a core 70-sailor crew to conduct the warfare mission and a 23-person air detachment.

=== Modular mission capability ===
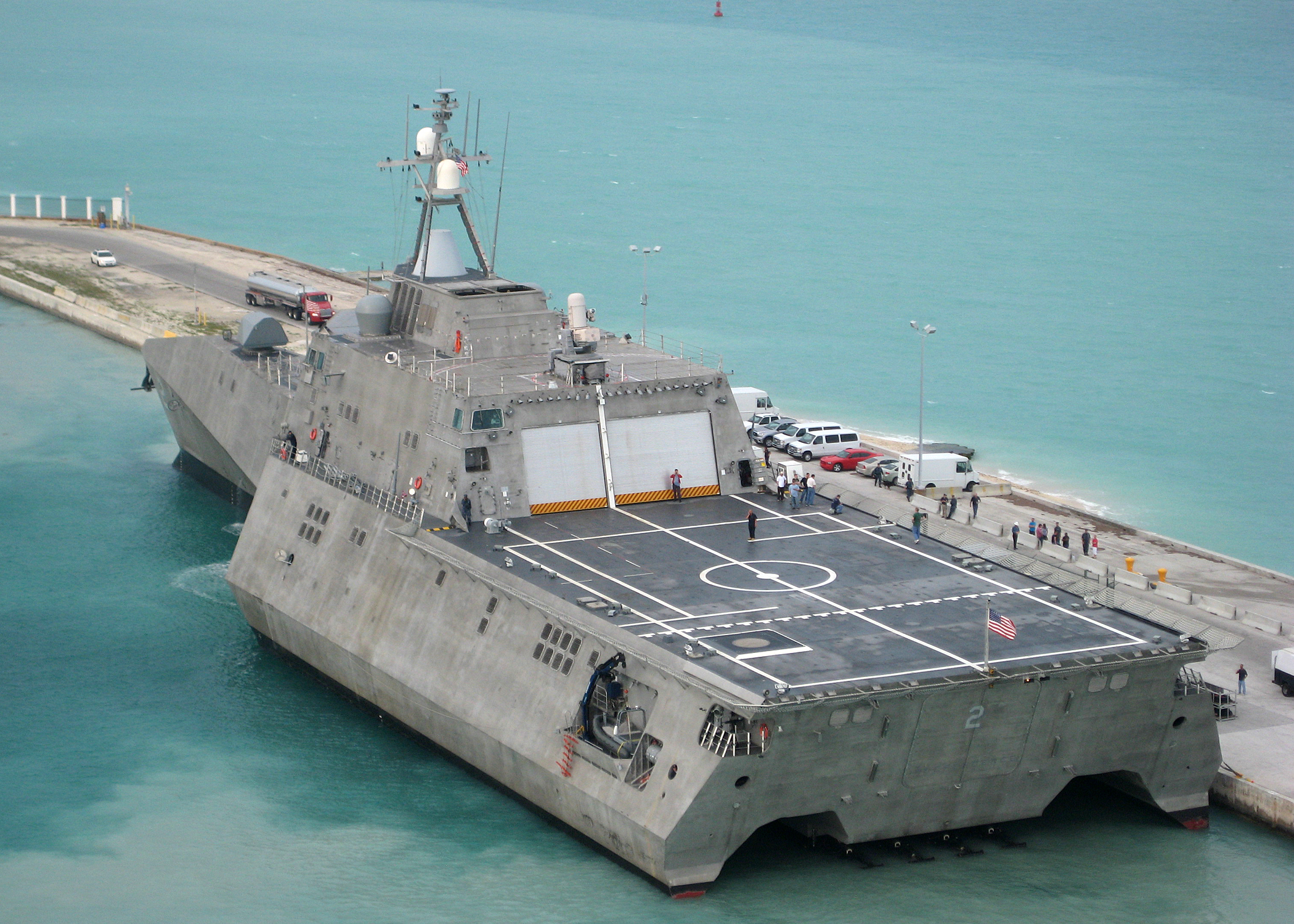
Stern view of Independence while in port at NAS Key West

The Independence class carries a default armament for self-defense, and command and control. Unlike traditional fighting ships with fixed armament such as guns and missiles, tailored mission modules can be configured for one mission package at a time. Modules may consist of manned aircraft, unmanned vehicles, off-board sensors, or mission-manning detachments. The interior volume and payload is greater than some destroyers and is sufficient to serve as a high-speed transport and maneuver platform. The mission bay is 15,200 square feet (1,410 m^{2}), and takes up most of the deck below the hangar and flight deck. With 11,000 cubic metres (390,000 cu ft) of payload volume, it was designed with enough payload and volume to carry out one mission with a separate mission module in reserve, allowing the ship to do multiple missions without having to be refitted.

One Mobicon Flexible Container Handling System is carried on each ship in order to move mission containers. In addition to cargo or container-sized mission modules, the bay can carry four lanes of multiple Strykers, armored Humvees, and their associated troops. An elevator allows air transport of packages the size of a 20-foot-long (6.1 m) shipping container that can be moved into the mission bay while at sea. A side access ramp allows for vehicle roll-on/roll-off loading to a dock and would have allowed the ship to transport the since-cancelled Expeditionary Fighting Vehicle.

=== Armament and sensors ===
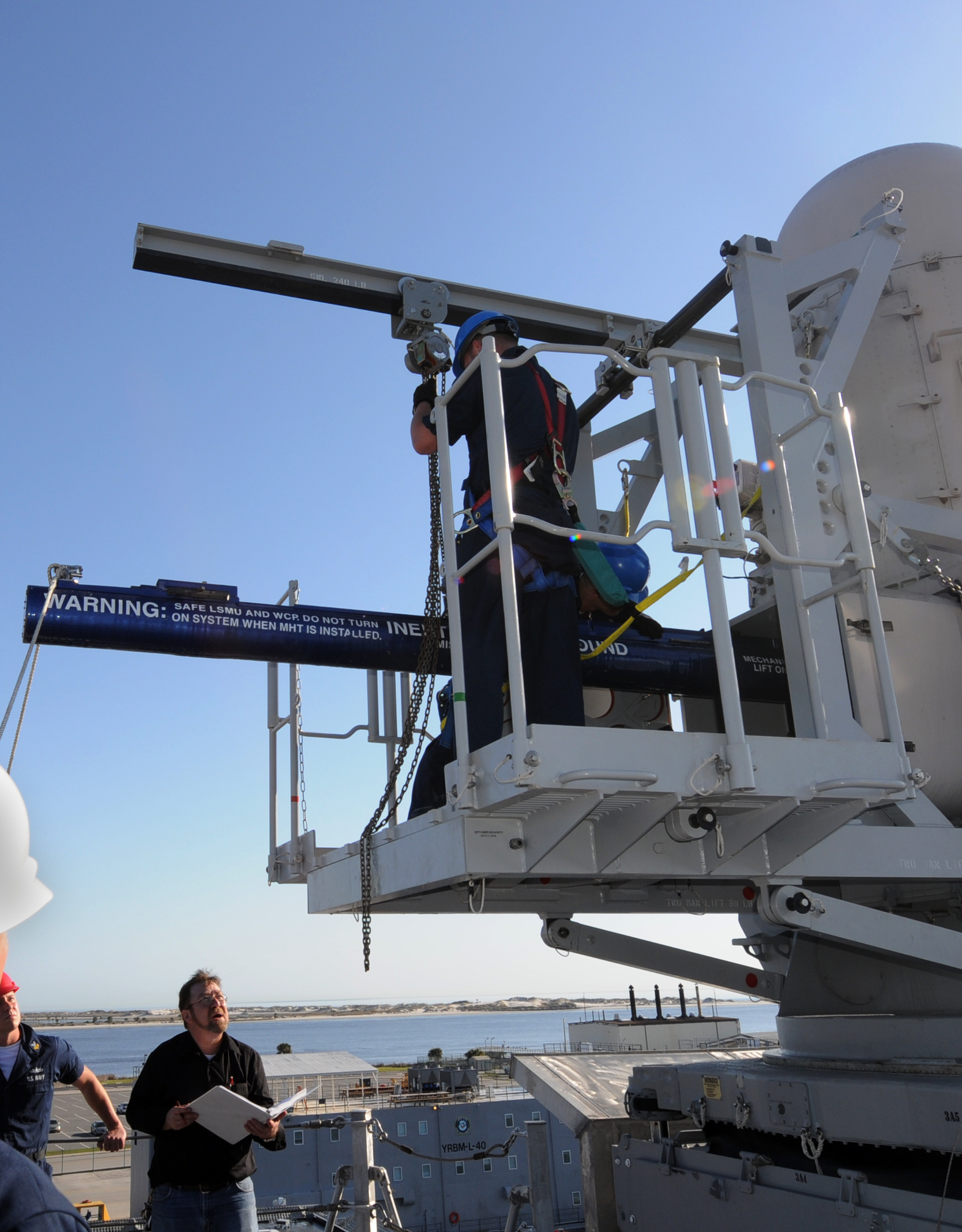
Crew loading a SeaRAM missile launcher

The Raytheon SeaRAM missile defense system is installed on the hangar roof. The SeaRAM combines the sensors of the Phalanx 1B close-in weapon system with an 11-missile launcher for the RIM-116 Rolling Airframe Missile, creating an autonomous system. The Independence-class ships also have an integrated LOS Mast, Sea Giraffe 3D Radar and SeaStar Safire FLIR. Northrop Grumman has demonstrated sensor fusion of on and off-board systems in the Integrated Combat Management System (ICMS) used on the LCS. The vessels have an Interior Communications Center that can be curtained off from the rest of bridge instead of the heavily protected Combat Information Center found on other Navy warships.

Side and forward surfaces are angled for reduced radar profile. The Fleet-class unmanned surface vessel is designed for operations from Independence-class ships. The flight deck, 1,030 m^{2} (11,100 sq ft), can support the operation of two SH-60 Seahawk helicopters, multiple unmanned aerial vehicles, or one CH-53 Sea Stallion helicopter. H-60 series helicopters provide airlift, rescue, anti-submarine, radar picket and anti-ship capabilities with torpedoes and missiles. DARPA's Tactically Exploited Reconnaissance Node (TERN) program aims to build a Medium-altitude long-endurance unmanned aerial vehicle (MALE UAV) that can operate from LCS-2 and can carry a payload of 600 pounds (270 kg) out to an operational radius of 600–900 nautical miles (1,100–1,700 km). First flight of a TERN demonstrator is expected in 2017. The trimaran hull will allow flight operations up to sea state 5. Austal USA vice president Craig Hooper has responded to critics of the class's light armament by suggesting that the ships employ long range drones instead.

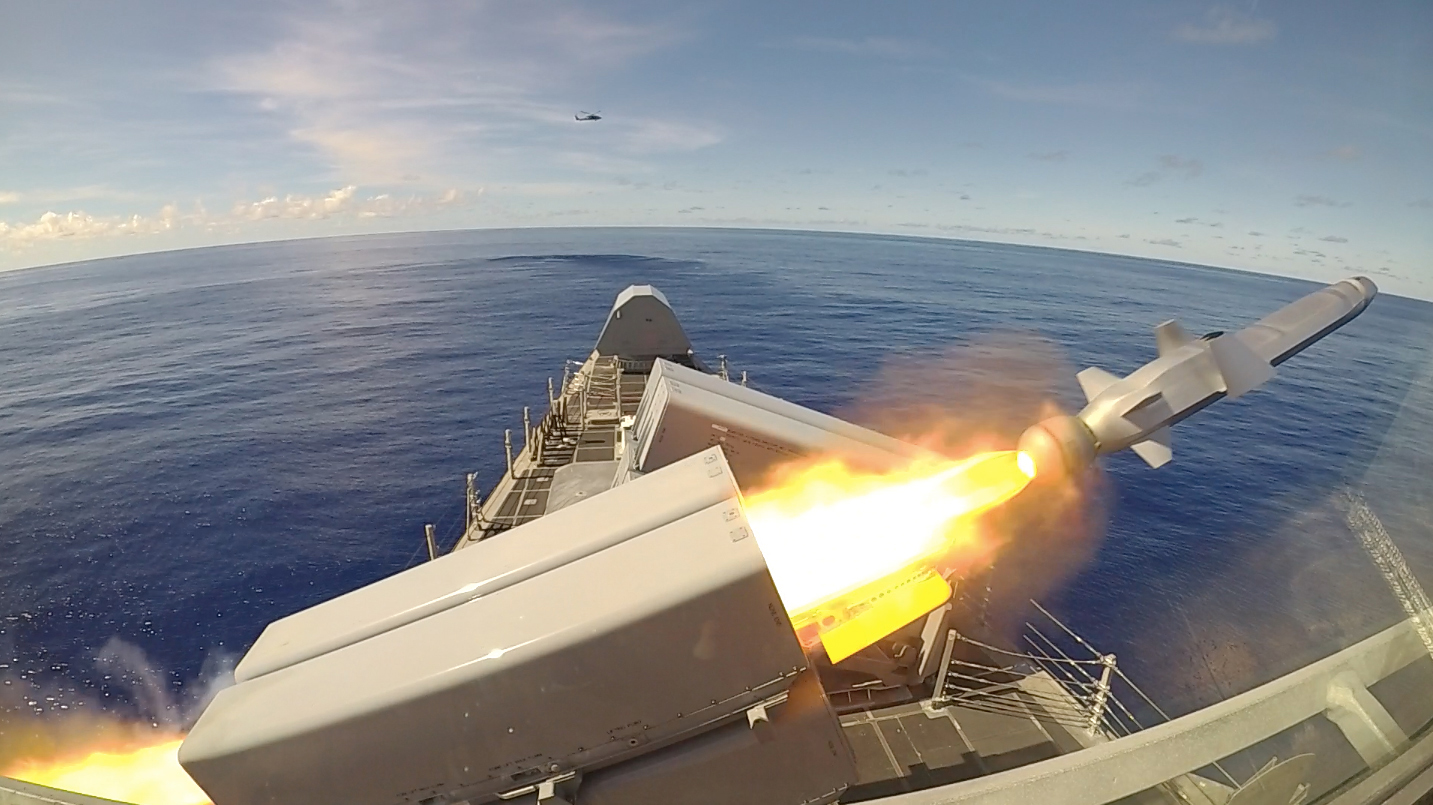
A Naval Strike Missile is fired from the USS Gabrielle Giffords (LCS-10) in 2019

On 8 March 2017, Detroit successfully test fired a vertical-launched AGM-114 Hellfire missile, the first such launch from a littoral combat ship. The Hellfire system on littoral combat ships is meant to engage smaller agile vessels and strike targets on land.

In late July 2014, the US Navy confirmed that the Naval Strike Missile would be tested aboard the littoral combat ship USS Coronado (LCS-4). The test occurred successfully on 24 September 2014. Kongsberg and Raytheon teamed to pitch the NSM to equip the LCS as its over-the-horizon anti-ship missile in 2015. By May 2017, the extended-range Boeing RGM-84 Harpoon and Lockheed Martin LRASM had been withdrawn from the Navy's Over-the-Horizon Weapon System (OTH-WS) competition, leaving the NSM as the only remaining contender.

On 31 May 2018, the Navy officially selected the NSM to serve as the LCS' OTH anti-ship weapon. The $14.8 million initial contract award to Raytheon calls for the delivery of Kongsberg-designed "encanistered missiles loaded into launching mechanisms; and a single fire control suite," and buys about a dozen missiles; the entire contract value could grow to $847.6 million if all contract options are exercised. The NSM will be designated as the RGM-184A in US service.

=== Control system ===
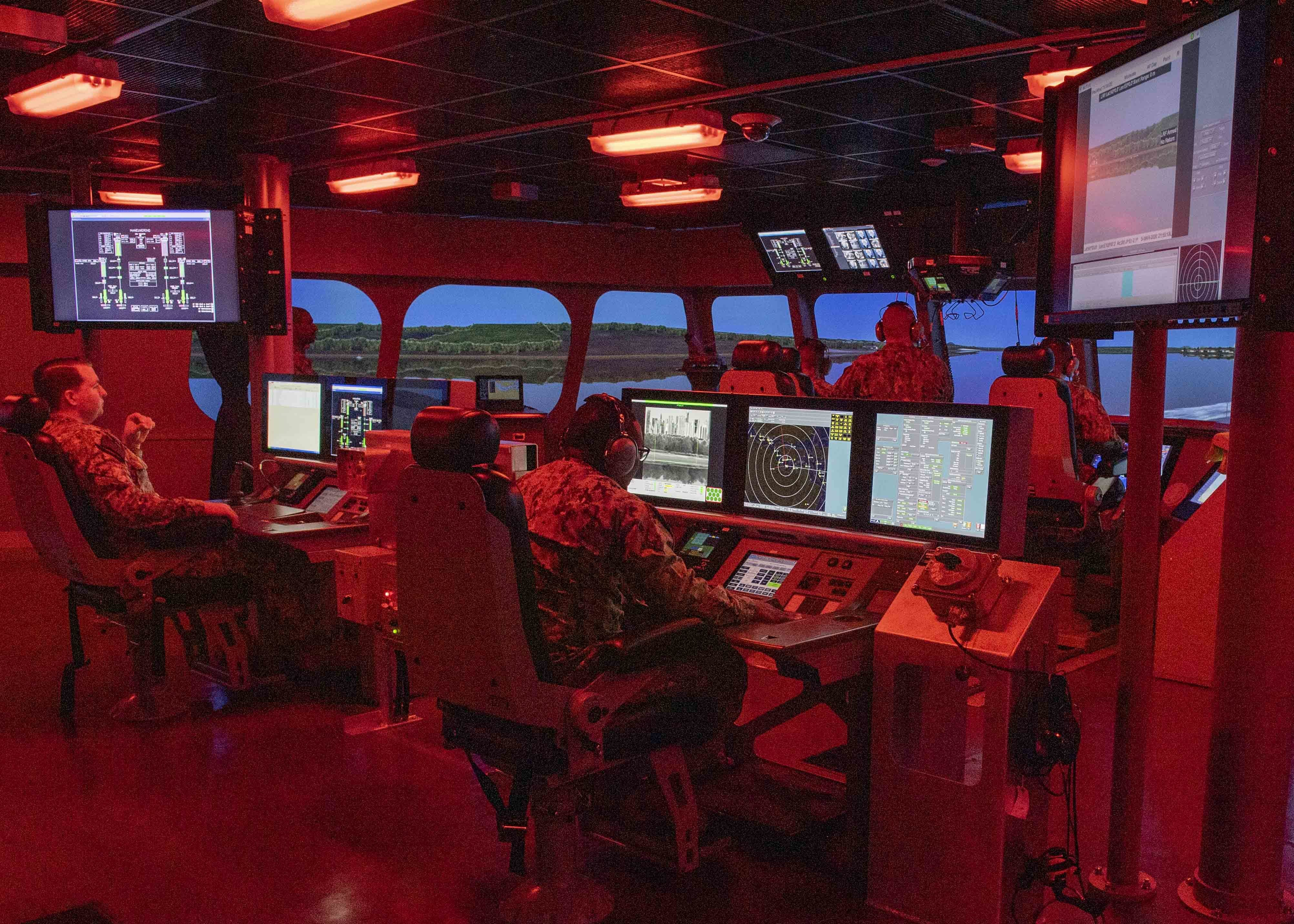
US sailors training in a simulated LCS bridge

The control system for this class is provided by General Dynamics Advanced Information Systems through an open architecture computing infrastructure (OPEN CI), while Lockheed provides their own control system for their variant of the LCS. OPEN CI includes the information technology (IT) infrastructure for the combat and seaframe control systems. This IT infrastructure also includes the primary operator interface for the control and monitoring of mission module operations. The General Dynamics OPEN CI is also used on the Austal-built Spearhead-class Joint High Speed Vessel.

=== Corrosion management ===
After the lead ship of the class suffered from aggressive disintegration due to galvanic corrosion, Austal has made changes to the remaining ships in the class. Coronado will have "new anti-corrosion surface treatments", and Jackson will have "an array of tested corrosion-management tools and processes".

=== Hull cracks ===
On 10 May 2022, it was reported that six of the Navy's fleet of 13 Independence class LCS suffered from hull cracks above the waterline where the deck plate and shell plate join. The cracks may develop if the ships travel faster than 15 knots (28 km/h; 17 mph) in seas with maximum wave heights of about 8 feet (2.4 m). The issue was first identified in 2019 in the second commissioned ship, Coronado. The solution to the issue was to replace the deck plate and shell plate with plates of thicker material. Austal making a statement that the cracks do not "pose a risk to the safety of Sailors on board the ships" and NAVSEA stating that the cracks do not affect the ships' ability to execute their missions; however, at least one of the affected ships, Omaha, was under speed and sea state restrictions.

== Small Surface Combatant ==
In December 2014, the Navy's recommendation to base the Small Surface Combatant on upgraded versions of both Independence and Freedom LCSs was accepted. The SSC is an attempt by the Navy to increase the LCS' firepower and protection. Although Austal submitted improvements including vertical launch systems, 76 mm guns, and advanced combat systems and sensors, the Navy opted to keep the 57 mm gun, not add a VLS, and chose to add an upgraded 3-D radar. Other changes included installation of an unspecified over-the-horizon missile, Mark 38 25 mm guns, a torpedo countermeasures system, a multifunction towed array system, installation of a SeaRAM launcher (on the Freedom class), an upgraded countermeasures decoy system, an upgraded electronic warfare system, armor added to vital spaces, and improved signature management.

The SSC focuses on Surface Warfare (SUW) and Anti-submarine Warfare (ASW) with these additions, as well as retaining all other features of their mission packages. The SSC is not required to perform Mine Counter Measures (MCM), which continues to be handled by the LCS. The vessels will retain a degree of modularity to concentrate on one mission set and will still have mission bays, although they may be reduced. SSC vessels were planned to begin procurement by 2019, and was being investigated if the enhancements could be added to existing LCS hulls.

== Derivative designs ==
Austal has proposed a much smaller and slower trimaran, called the 'Multi Role Vessel' (MRV 80). Though it is only half the size of their LCS design, it would still be useful for border protection and counter piracy operations.

Austal unsuccessfully entered the FFG(X) competition for the US Navy's new class of 20 frigates, unveiling a larger more heavily armed design called the "Austal Frigate" in April 2017. Their Frigate design was selected as one of the five finalists. Based on the Independence LCS trimaran hull, it features a slightly shorter flight deck for an aft section that can hold eight anti-ship missiles, an addition to the eight missile launchers in the forward section, for 16 total. The Austal Frigate design can feature an optional 16-cell Mk 41 VLS. For anti-submarine warfare, a variable depth sonar is planned as well as a towed array with its handling system.

== Ships ==
=== Ship order and naming history ===
The Navy originally ordered two Independence-class littoral combat ships, the lead ship Independence (LCS-2) and Coronado (LCS-4), named in March 2009 by then-Secretary of the Navy Donald C. Winter, with odd numbers being used for Freedom-class littoral combat ships. On 29 December 2010, the Navy announced that it would be ordering up to ten additional Independence-class ships, for a total of 12 ships in the class. On 25 March 2011, then-Secretary of the Navy Ray Mabus announced the names of the third and fourth Independence-class ships, Jackson (LCS-6) and Montgomery (LCS-8), during a press conference in Mobile, Alabama. In February 2012, Secretary Mabus announced that the fifth ship of the class would be named Gabrielle Giffords (LCS-10), and the sixth named Omaha (LCS-12). The Navy announced the name Manchester (LCS-14) in April 2013 Tulsa (LCS-16) the following June.

On 11 March 2014, the Navy awarded contract options to fund construction of LCS-18 and LCS-20, the seventh and eighth ships in a 10-ship contract. In January 2015, Secretary Mabus announced the name of Charleston (LCS-18). and Cincinnati (LCS-20) the following July. On 1 April 2015, the Navy awarded build contracts for LCS-22 and LCS-24 to Austal USA. On 20 July 2015, at a Kansas City Royals baseball game being played at Kauffman Stadium in Kansas City, Missouri, Secretary Mabus and Mayor Sly James announced the name of Kansas City (LCS-22). On 20 August 2015, Secretary Mabus announced that the twelfth ship would be named Oakland (LCS-24).

On 31 March 2016, Austal announced the order to build the thirteenth Independence-class vessel with a congressional cost cap of $564 million, which had been placed as an option under Austal's existing 10-vessel block-buy contract. LCS-26 will be the eleventh vessel built under that contract and the thirteenth Independence-class vessel overall (the first two ships, Independence and Coronado were built prior to award of the 10-vessel contract). In September 2016, Secretary Mabus announced the name of the next ship, Mobile (LCS-26).

On 26 June 2017, Austal announced the order to build the fourteenth Independence-class vessel with a congressional cost cap of $584 million. On 8 October 2017 Austal announced the order for LCS-30, the fifteenth ship of the class, to be built at a cost under the congressional cost cap of $584 million. On 13 February 2018, Navy Secretary Richard V. Spencer announced the name of LCS-28 as Savannah, and on 23 February 2018, President Donald Trump announced the name of LCS-30 as Canberra.

On 18 September 2018, the Navy announced that two additional Independence-class ships, and one Freedom-class ship, have been ordered, with hull numbers LCS-32, LCS-34 and LCS-29 respectively. On 10 October 2018, Navy Secretary Richard Spencer announced the names of LCS-29 as Beloit, for Beloit, Wisconsin and LCS-32 as Santa Barbara, for Santa Barbara, California.

On 16 December 2018, the Navy announced that two additional Independence-class ships had been ordered with hull numbers LCS-36, and LCS-38.

=== Ships in class ===
Ship	Hull Number	Laid down	Launched	Commissioned	Decommissioned	Status
Independence	LCS-2	19 January 2006	26 April 2008	16 January 2010	29 July 2021	Decommissioned
Coronado	LCS-4	17 December 2009	14 January 2012	5 April 2014	14 September 2022	Decommissioned
Jackson	LCS-6	1 August 2011	14 December 2013	5 December 2015		Active in service
Montgomery	LCS-8	25 June 2013	6 August 2014	10 September 2016		Active in service
Gabrielle Giffords	LCS-10	16 April 2014	25 February 2015	10 June 2017		Active in service
Omaha	LCS-12	18 February 2015	20 November 2015	3 February 2018		Active in service
Manchester	LCS-14	29 June 2015	12 May 2016	26 May 2018		Active in service
Tulsa	LCS-16	11 January 2016	16 March 2017	16 February 2019		Active in service
Charleston	LCS-18	28 June 2016	14 September 2017	2 March 2019		Active in service
Cincinnati	LCS-20	10 April 2017	22 May 2018	5 October 2019		Active in service
Kansas City	LCS-22	15 November 2017	19 October 2018	20 June 2020		Active in service
Oakland	LCS-24	20 July 2018	21 July 2019	17 April 2021		Active in service
Mobile	LCS-26	14 December 2018	11 January 2020	22 May 2021		Active in service
Savannah	LCS-28	20 September 2019	8 September 2020	5 February 2022		Active in service
Canberra	LCS-30	10 March 2020	30 March 2021	22 July 2023		Active in service
Santa Barbara	LCS-32	27 October 2020	12 November 2021	1 April 2023		Active in service
Augusta	LCS-34	30 July 2021	23 May 2022	30 September 2023		Active in service
Kingsville	LCS-36	23 February 2022	23 March 2023	24 August 2024		Active in service
Pierre	LCS-38	16 June 2023	5 August 2024	15 November 2025		Active in service

==== Plan to retire LCS hulls ====
During planning for the FY21 Budget proposal, the US Navy recommended the decommissioning of hulls 1–4 in 2021, some 10 years ahead of prior planning. This was explained by Chief of Naval Operations, Admiral Mike Gilday, during the WEST Conference on 2 March 2020, when he said:

We made a decision a number of years ago. ... In order to give capability to LCS 5 and beyond, particularly the block buys we did in 2015, we decided we needed to do much more testing and use those first four hulls, so that we could better understand what were the issues with respect to hull maintenance and engineering that kept plaguing us and kept us from getting those ships to sea. ... We used those first hulls to test and we put no money into upgrading them like the rest of the fleet. ... Those first four ships are not bringing lethality to the fight. ... I just didn't see the return on investment.

There was also a comment that it would cost another $2 billion to get the first four hulls prepped for sea duty.

On 20 June 2020, the US Navy announced that they would be taking Independence out of commission in March 2021, and placing her, along with Freedom, Fort Worth, and Coronado in reserve.

In May 2021, the Navy confirmed it would decommission the first two littoral combat ships in 2021. On 29 July 2021, the Navy decommissioned Independence. Freedom was decommissioned on 29 September 2021. Both ships will join the reserve fleet.

In June 2021, the Navy released an abbreviated long-range shipbuilding report to Congress, which included ships planned to be decommissioned during fiscal year 2022. This included the Independence class Coronado and three Freedom class ships, Fort Worth, Detroit, and Little Rock. All four ships would be placed Out of Commission in Reserve and retained as reactivation candidates.

== In popular culture ==
USS Independence appears in the Discovery Channel documentary Inside: A 21st Century Warship, which also features USS Freedom (LCS-1).

USS Kansas City (LCS-22) and USS Mobile (LCS-26) appear prominently in the book Grey Dragons - Red Ascendant by author Olan Prentice.

A pair of heavily-equipped combat ships modeled after Independence-class appear in the opening sequence of the movie Cars 2.

The Independence-class served as the basis for the design of land battleships in Ace Combat 8: Wings of Theve.

== See also ==
- Freedom-class littoral combat ship
- Independence-class littoral mission vessel
- HSV Sea Slice, SLICE catamaran
- Sea Fighter (FSF-1), SWATH catamaran
- Sea Shadow (IX-529), stealth catamaran
- RV Triton, British trimaran warship demonstrator
- Type 056 corvette, Chinese class fulfilling the same role
