= USS Oakland (LCS-24) =

Independence-class littoral combat ship of the United States Navy

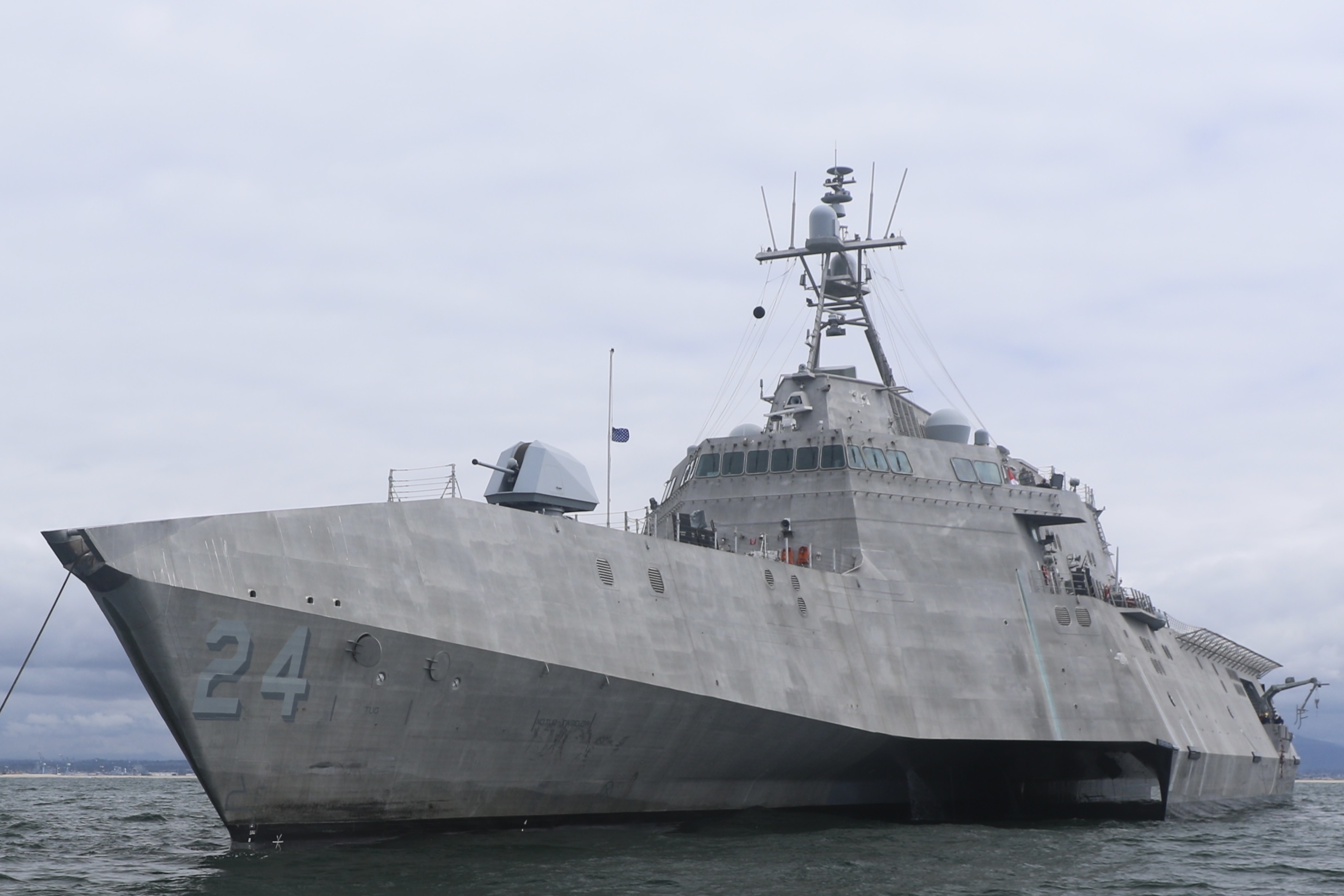
- USS Oakland in 8 March 2021

History

United States
- Name: Oakland
- Namesake: Oakland
- Awarded: 29 December 2010
- Builder: Austal USA
- Laid down: 20 July 2018
- Launched: 21 July 2019
- Sponsored by: Kate Brandt
- Christened: 29 June 2019
- Acquired: 26 June 2020
- Commissioned: 17 April 2021
- Home port: San Diego
- Identification: Hull number: LCS-24
- Motto: Fortitude, Determination, Communication
- Status: Active
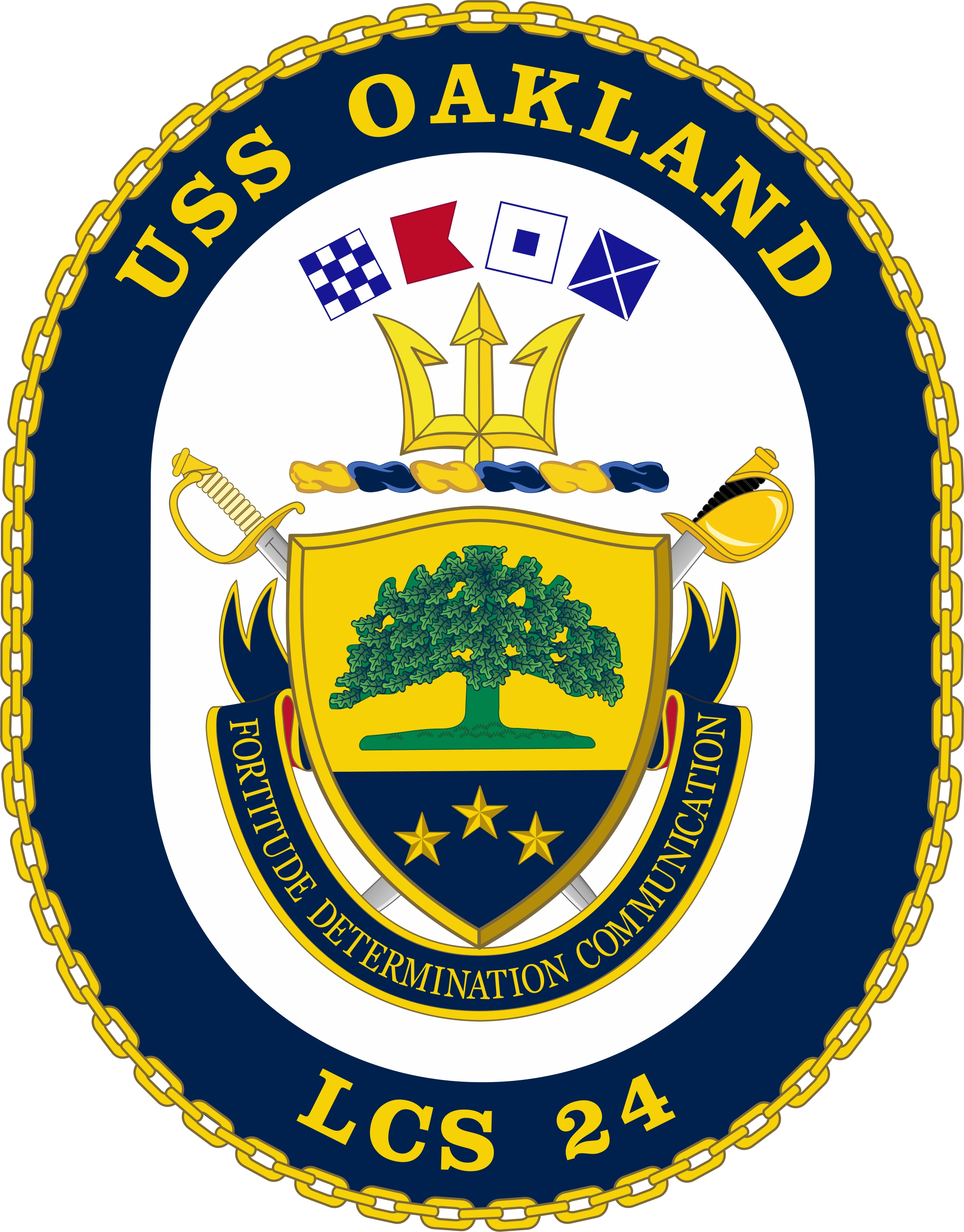
- Badge

General characteristics
- Class & type: Independence-class littoral combat ship
- Displacement: 2,307 metric tons light, 3,104 metric tons full, 797 metric tons deadweight
- Length: 127.4 m (418 ft)
- Beam: 31.6 m (104 ft)
- Draft: 14 ft (4.27 m)
- Propulsion: 2× gas turbines, 2× diesel, 4× waterjets, retractable Azimuth thruster, 4× diesel generators
- Speed: 40 knots (74 km/h; 46 mph)+, 47 knots (54 mph; 87 km/h) sprint
- Range: 4,300 nautical miles (8,000 km; 4,900 mi) at 20 knots (37 km/h; 23 mph)+
- Capacity: 210 tonnes
- Complement: 40 core crew (8 officers, 32 enlisted) plus up to 35 mission crew
- Sensors & processing systems: Sea Giraffe 3D Surface/Air RADAR; Bridgemaster-E Navigational RADAR; AN/KAX-2 EO/IR sensor for GFC
- Electronic warfare & decoys: EDO ES-3601 ESM; 4× SRBOC rapid bloom chaff launchers
- Armament: BAE Systems Mk 110 57 mm gun; 4× .50 cal (12.7 mm) guns (2 aft, 2 forward); Evolved SeaRAM 11 cell missile launcher; Mission modules
- Aircraft carried: 2× MH-60R/S Seahawks

USS Oakland (LCS-24) is an Independence-class littoral combat ship of the United States Navy. She is the third ship to be named for the City of Oakland, California.

== Design ==
In 2002, the United States Navy initiated a program to develop the first of a fleet of littoral combat ships. The Navy initially ordered two trimaran hulled ships from General Dynamics, which became known as the Independence-class littoral combat ship after the first ship of the class, USS Independence. Even-numbered US Navy littoral combat ships are built using the Independence-class trimaran design, while odd-numbered ships are based on a competing design, the conventional monohull Freedom-class littoral combat ship. The initial order of littoral combat ships involved a total of four ships, including two of the Independence-class design. On 29 December 2010, the Navy announced that it was awarding Austal USA a contract to build ten additional Independence-class littoral combat ships.

== Construction and career ==
Oakland was built by Austal USA in Mobile, Alabama. A ceremonial laying of the keel was held at the Austal USA shipyards in Mobile on 20 July 2018. The ship was christened on 29 June 2019 and then launched on 21 July 2019. She was delivered to the Navy on 26 June 2020, and was commissioned on 17 April 2021. The ship was in Honiara, Solomon Islands on 7 August 2022 for ceremonies marking the 80th anniversary of the Battle of Guadalcanal.
