= SeaRAM weapon system =

Close-in weapon system

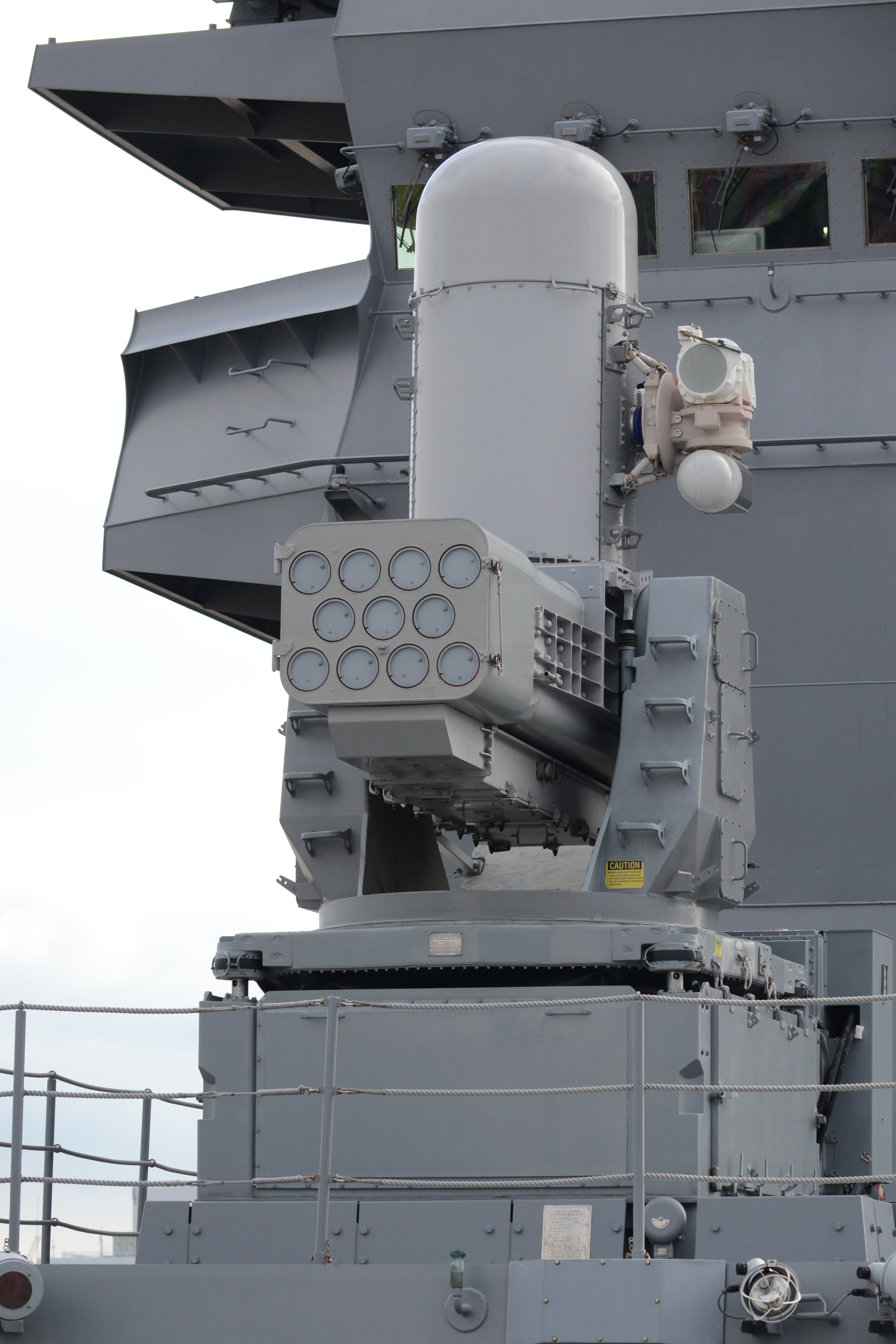
SeaRAM system on the JMSDF Izumo-class aircraft-carrying multi-role cruiser Izumo (DDH-183)

The SeaRAM weapon system is an American missile-based close-in weapon system (CIWS), combining the sensor systems of the US Navy's earlier Phalanx CIWS with the weapons systems of its RIM-116 Rolling Airframe Missile. The new system was conceived to add enhanced protection to existing Arleigh Burke-class destroyers dedicated to the BMD (Ballistic Missile Defense) mission using the Aegis Combat System. Raytheon is the primary contractor for the system, as it is also the primary contractors for both the Phalanx and Rolling Airframe Missile systems, which it became after acquiring Hughes, which owned General Dynamics' missile division, which originally designed and produced both, although German contractor Diehl Defense also contributed to development of the RIM-116.

== See also ==
- RIM-116 Rolling Airframe Missile § SeaRAM
