= USS Detroit (LCS-7) =

Freedom-class littoral combat ship of the US Navy

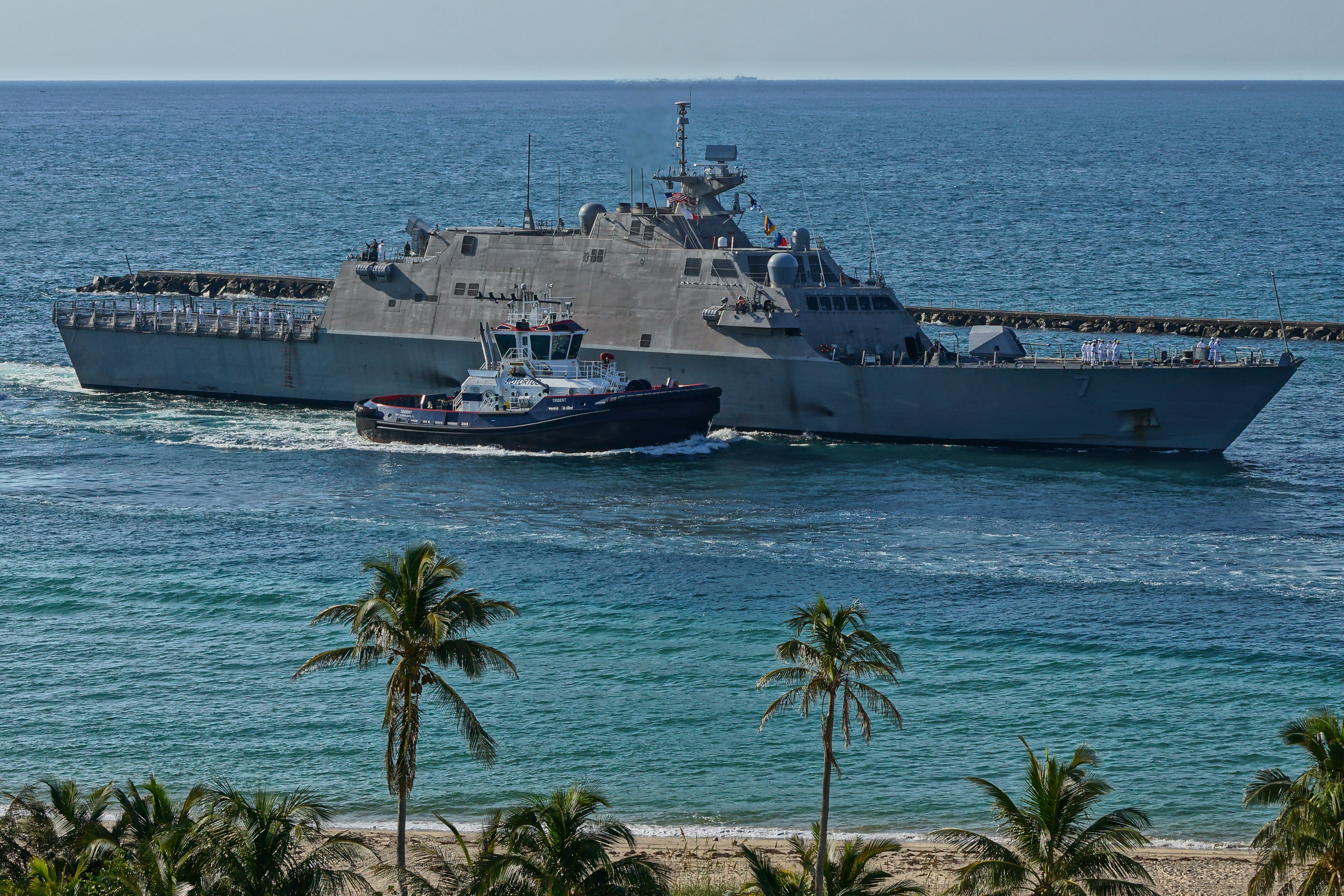
- USS Detroit on 30 April 2018

History

United States
- Name: Detroit
- Namesake: Detroit
- Awarded: 17 March 2011
- Builder: Marinette Marine
- Laid down: 8 November 2012
- Launched: 18 October 2014
- Sponsored by: Mrs. Barbara Levin
- Christened: 18 October 2014
- Acquired: 12 August 2016
- Commissioned: 22 October 2016
- Decommissioned: 29 September 2023
- Identification: Hull number: LCS-7
- Motto: Swift Vigilance
- Status: Stricken, Final Disposition Pending
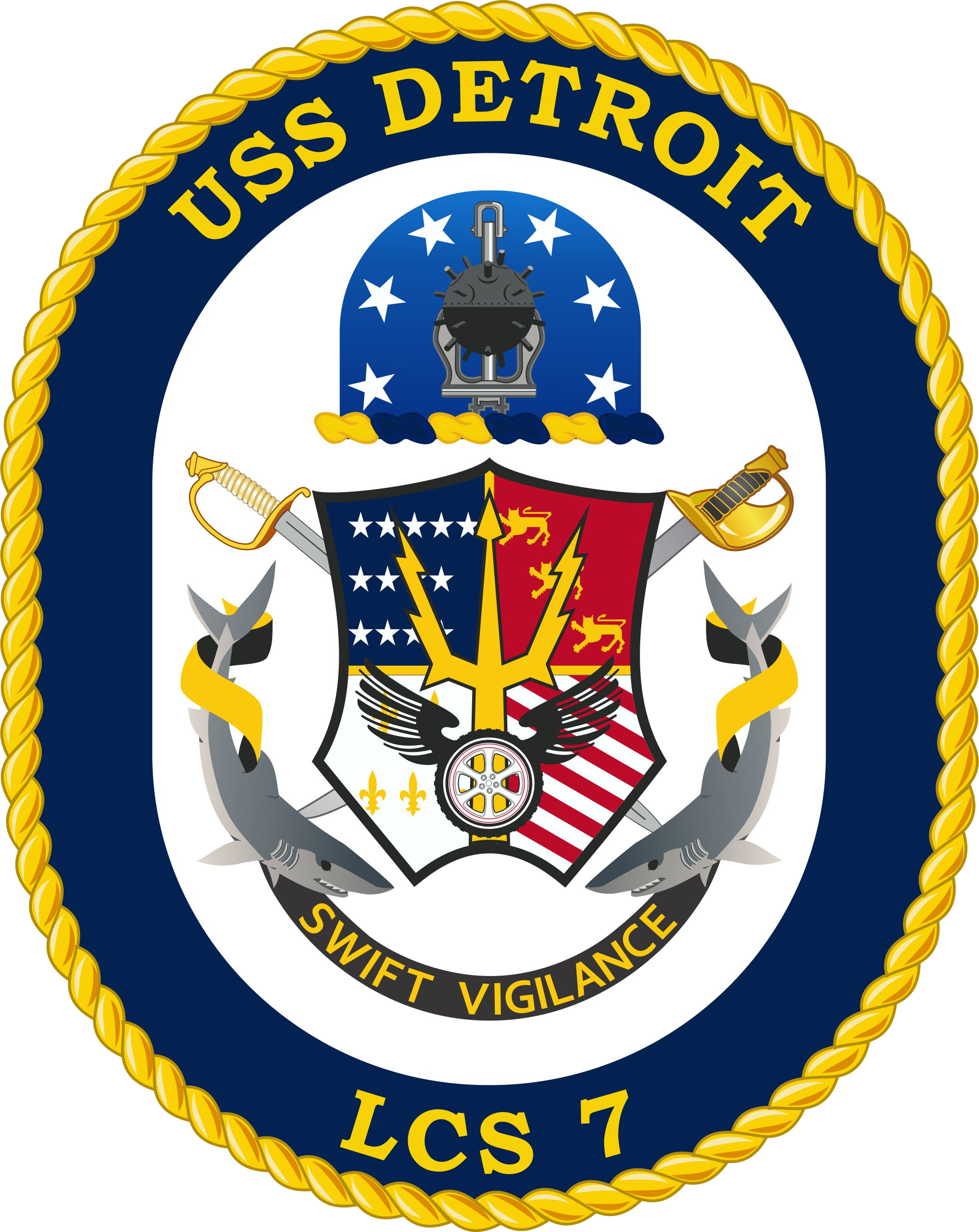
- Badge

General characteristics
- Class & type: Freedom-class littoral combat ship
- Displacement: 3,500 metric tons (3,900 short tons) full load
- Length: 378.3 ft (115.3 m)
- Beam: 57.4 ft (17.5 m)
- Draft: 13.0 ft (3.7 m)
- Propulsion: 2 Rolls-Royce MT30 36 MW gas turbines, 2 Colt-Pielstick diesel engines, 4 Rolls-Royce waterjets
- Speed: 40 knots (46 mph; 74 km/h) (sea state 3)
- Range: 3,500 nmi (6,500 km) at 18 knots (21 mph; 33 km/h)
- Endurance: 21 days (336 hours)
- Boats & landing craft carried: 11 m RHIB, 40 ft (12 m) high-speed boats
- Complement: 15 to 50 core crew, 75 mission crew (Blue and Gold crews)
- Armament: BAE Systems Mk 110 57 mm gun; 2 Mk44 Bushmaster II; RIM-116 Rolling Airframe Missiles; Honeywell Mk 50 Torpedo; AGM-114 Hellfire; 2 .50 cal (12.7 mm) guns
- Aircraft carried: 2 MH-60R/S Seahawks; MQ-8 Fire Scout
- Notes: Electrical power is provided by 4 Isotta Fraschini V1708 diesel engines with Hitzinger generator units rated at 800 kW each.

USS Detroit (LCS-7) is the fourth Freedom-class littoral combat ship of the United States Navy. She is the sixth ship to be named after the city of Detroit, Michigan. She was decommissioned on September 29th, 2023.

== Design ==
In 2002, the U.S. Navy initiated a program to develop the first of a fleet of littoral combat ships. The Navy initially ordered two monohull ships from Lockheed Martin, which became known as the Freedom-class littoral combat ships after the first ship of the class, USS Freedom. Odd-numbered U.S. Navy littoral combat ships are built using the Freedom-class monohull design, while even-numbered ships are based on a competing design, the trimaran hull Independence-class littoral combat ship from General Dynamics. The initial order of littoral combat ships involved a total of four ships, including two of the Freedom-class design. Detroit is the fourth Freedom-class littoral combat ship to be built.

Detroit includes additional stability improvements over the original Freedom design; the stern transom was lengthened and buoyancy tanks were added to the stern to increase weight service and enhance stability. The ship will also feature automated sensors to allow "conditions-based maintenance" and reduce crew overwork and fatigue issues that Freedom had on her first deployment.

== Construction and career ==
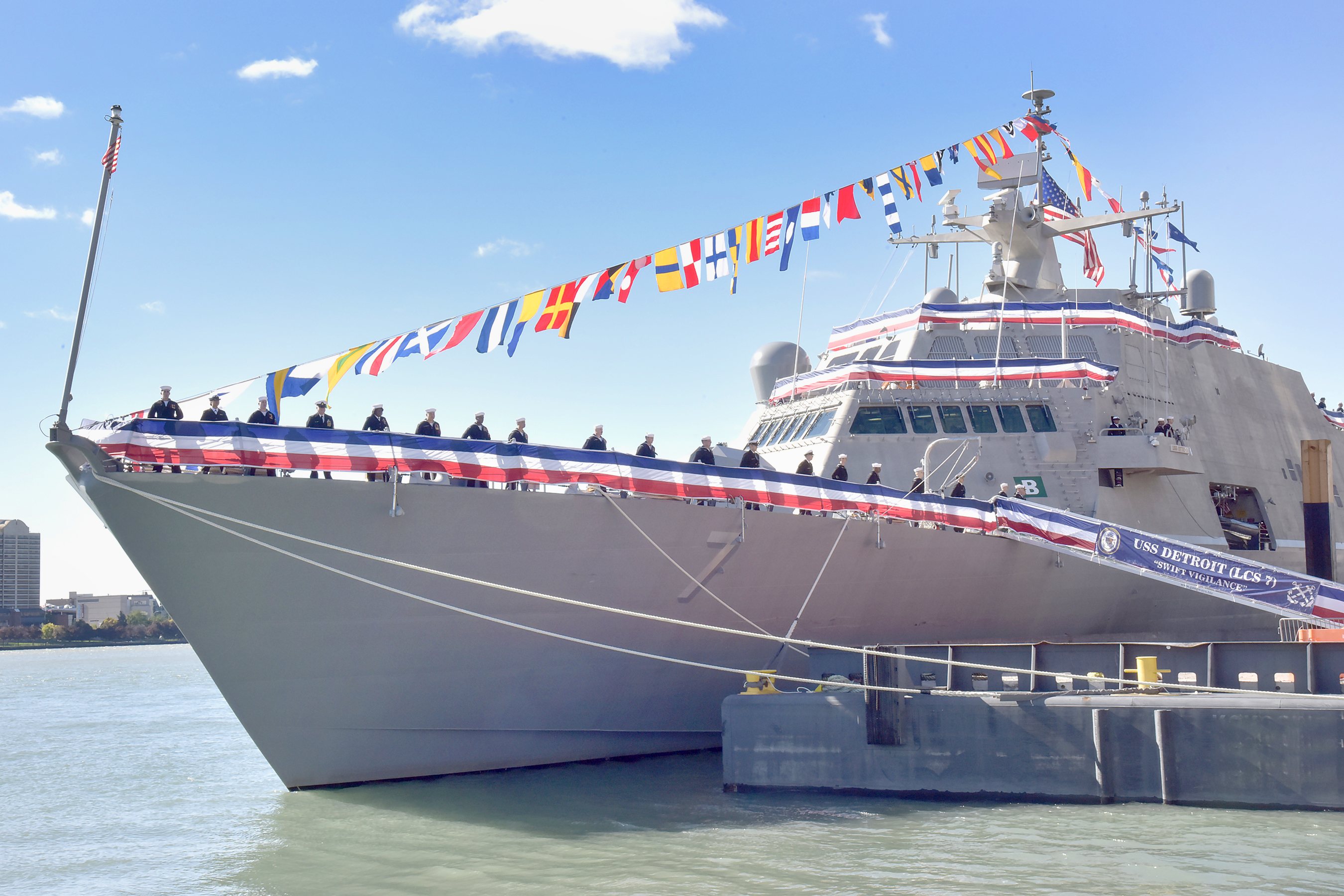
Commissioning of Detroit on 22 October 2016

The ceremonial "laying of the keel" was in early November 2012 at the Marinette Marine shipyards in Marinette, Wisconsin. The ship was launched on 18 October 2014. The US Navy accepted Detroit into service on 12 August 2016; the ship was commissioned on 22 October 2016. She is assigned to Littoral Combat Ship Squadron Two. The ship is sponsored by Mrs. Barbara Levin (Wife of Senator Carl Levin)

On 30 December 2016, Detroit participated in a homeport shift ceremony that took place at Naval Station Mayport. The ship was previously scheduled to be based out of Naval Base San Diego but was reassigned while en route.

On 13 January 2017, Detroit completed her first flight deck evolutions to certify the flight deck for future air operations. The landings and VERTREP were conducted by the "Swamp Foxes" of HSM-74. On 8 March 2017, Detroit fired a vertical-launched AGM-114 Hellfire missile, the first such launch from a littoral combat ship. The Hellfire system is meant to engage small vessels and strike targets on land.

In January 2020, Detroit conducted freedom of navigation and intelligence-gathering operations in the Caribbean Sea.

Detroit, the fourth ship of the Freedom-class, was planned to be inactivated in FY 2022, and to join the Out of Commission in Reserve (OCIR) list, along with three other ships in the class: Freedom, Fort Worth, and Little Rock. However, in the final 2022 budget, Congress blocked the Navy's request to retire the three ships.

On 21 June 2023 Detroit got underway for its final deployment to the 4th fleet AOR to support regional cooperation and security.

On 27 September 2023 Detroit returned to Mayport in preparation to decommission the ship two days later.

On 29 September 2023, Detroit was decommissioned at Mayport.

== Awards ==
- Battle "E" – (2019)
