= USS Milwaukee (LCS-5) =

Freedom-class littoral combat ship of the US Navy

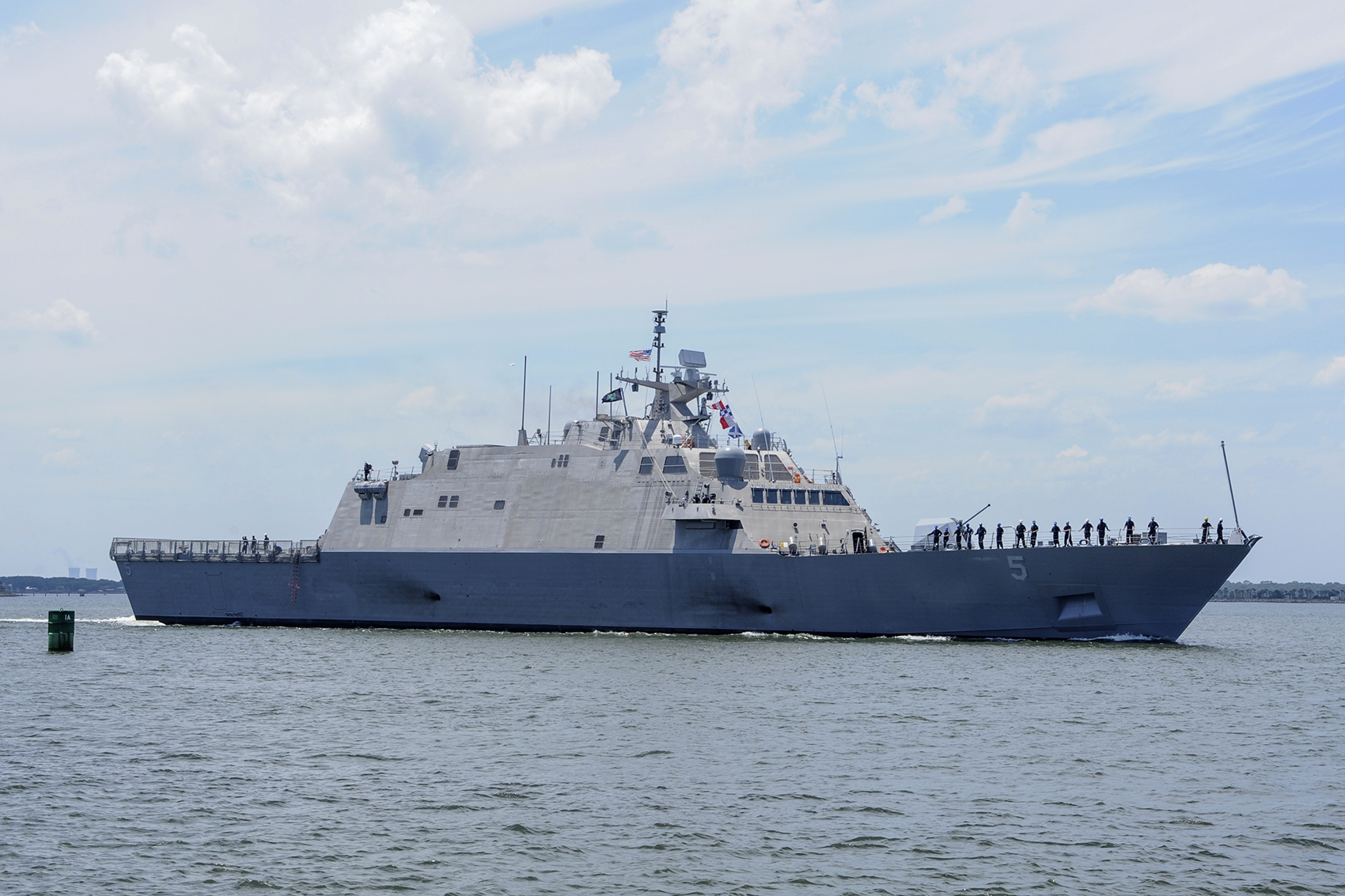
- USS Milwaukee on 8 June 2016

History

United States
- Name: Milwaukee
- Namesake: Milwaukee
- Awarded: 29 December 2010
- Builder: Marinette Marine, Marinette, Wisconsin
- Laid down: 27 October 2011
- Launched: 18 December 2013
- Christened: 18 December 2013
- Acquired: 16 October 2015
- Commissioned: 21 November 2015
- Decommissioned: 8 September 2023
- Home port: Mayport
- Identification: Hull number: LCS-5
- Motto: Strength - Freedom
- Status: Stricken, Final Disposition Pending
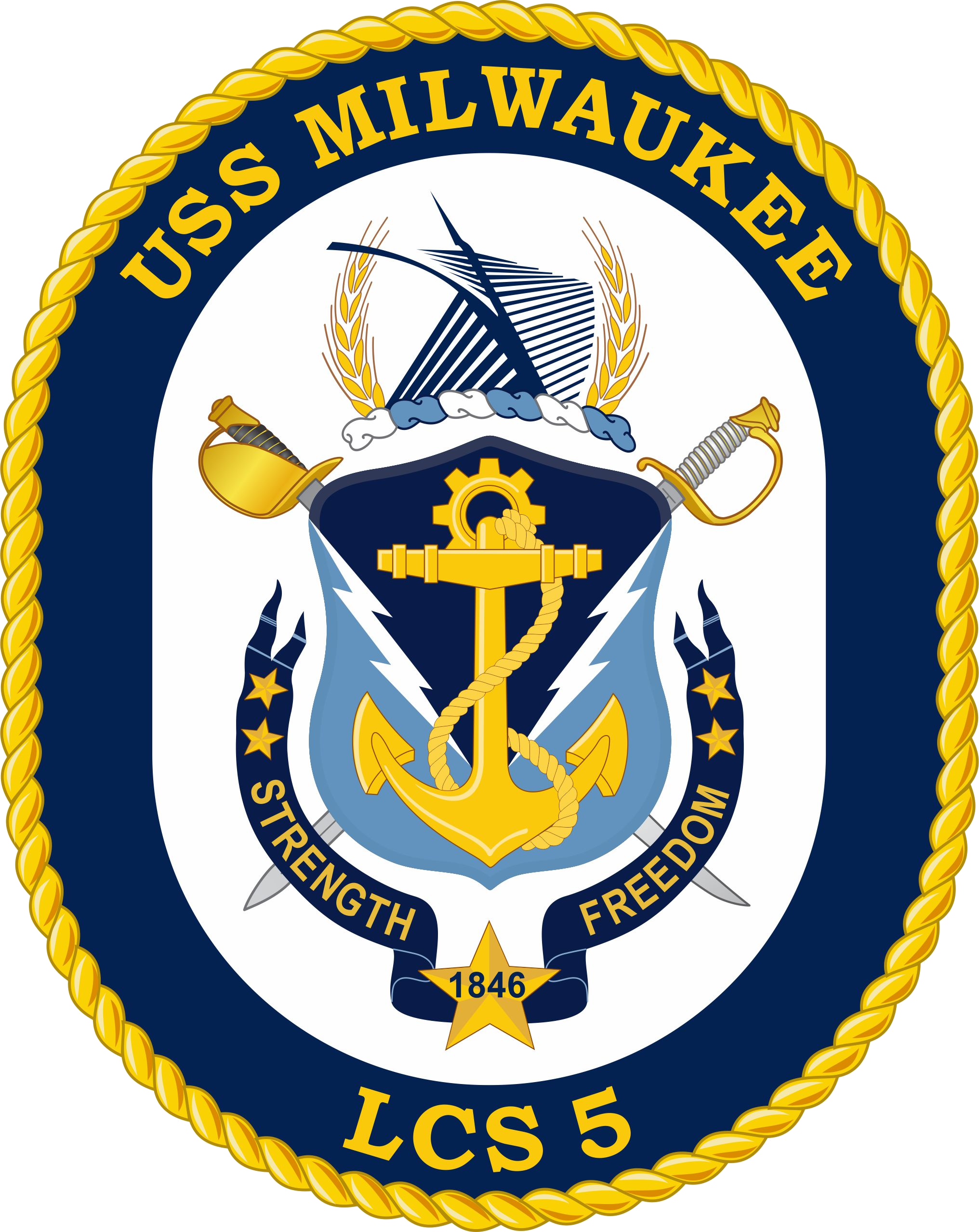
- Badge

General characteristics
- Class & type: Freedom-class littoral combat ship
- Displacement: 3,500 metric tons (3,900 short tons) full load
- Length: 378.3 ft (115.3 m)
- Beam: 43 ft (13 m) wl; 57.4 ft (17.5 m) (extreme)
- Draft: 13 ft (4.0 m) (navigational); 14 ft (4.3 m) (draft limit)
- Installed power: 2 × Rolls-Royce MT30 36 MW gas turbines; 2 × Colt-Pielstick diesel engines
- Propulsion: 4 × Rolls-Royce waterjets
- Speed: 45 knots (52 mph; 83 km/h) (sea state 3)
- Range: 3,500 nmi (6,500 km) at 18 knots (21 mph; 33 km/h)
- Endurance: 21 days (336 hours)
- Boats & landing craft carried: 11 m RHIB, 40 ft (12 m) high-speed boats
- Complement: 50 core crew, 75 with mission crew (Crews rotate through hulls)
- Sensors & processing systems: EADS TRS-3D C-band radar; X-Band Navigational Radar; S-Band Navigational Radar
- Electronic warfare & decoys: WBR 2000; Super RBOCs; Nulka decoy launchers
- Armament: 1 × BAE Systems Mk 110 57 mm gun; 1 × RIM-116 Rolling Airframe Missiles; 6 × Mark 50 torpedo tubes; 2 × Mk44 Bushmaster II 30 millimeter guns; 4 × .50-cal guns; "Mission modules"
- Aircraft carried: 2 MH-60R/S Seahawks; MQ-8 Fire Scout
- Notes: Electrical power is provided by 4 Isotta Fraschini V1708 diesel engines with Hitzinger generator units rated at 800 kW each.

USS Milwaukee (LCS-5) is a decommissioned Freedom-class littoral combat ship of the United States Navy. She was the fifth ship to be named for the city of Milwaukee, the largest city in Wisconsin.

== Design ==
In 2002, the U.S. Navy initiated a program to develop the first of a fleet of littoral combat ships. The Navy initially ordered two monohull ships from Lockheed Martin, which became known as the Freedom-class littoral combat ships after the first ship of the class, USS Freedom. Odd-numbered U.S. Navy littoral combat ships are built using the Freedom-class monohull design, while even-numbered ships are based on a competing design, the trimaran hull littoral combat ships from General Dynamics. The initial order of littoral combat ships involved a total of four ships, including two of the Freedom-class design. Milwaukee is the third Freedom-class littoral combat ship to be built.

Milwaukee includes additional stability improvements over the original Freedom design; the stern transom was lengthened and buoyancy tanks were added to the stern to increase weight service and enhance stability. The ship will also feature automated sensors to allow "conditions-based maintenance" and reduce crew overwork and fatigue issues that Freedom had on her first deployment.

== Construction ==
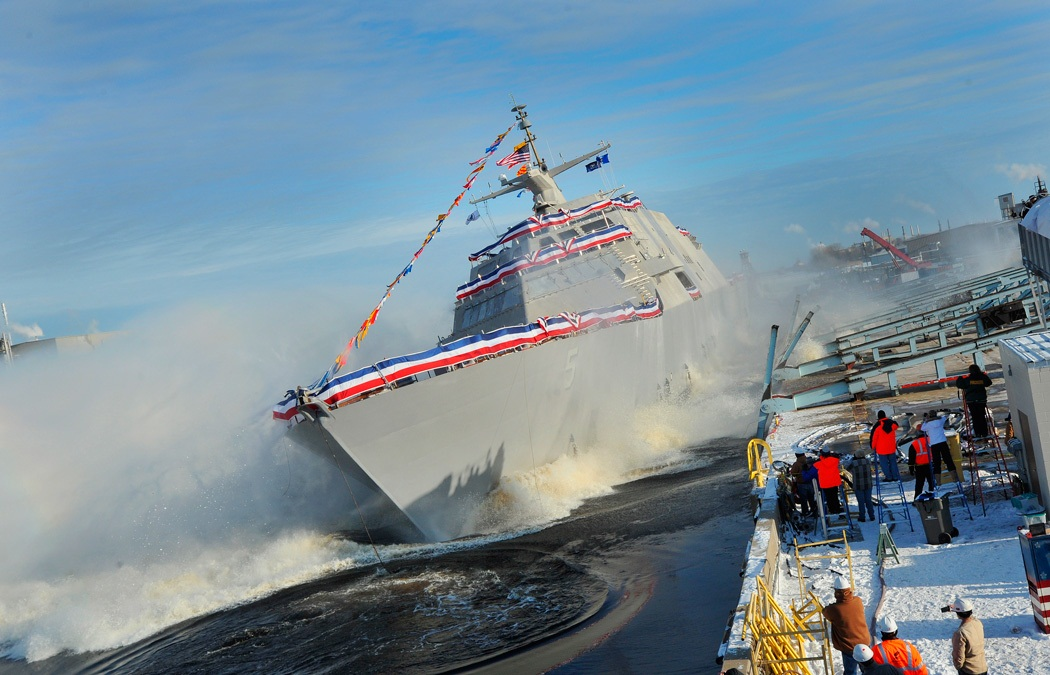
Launching of Milwaukee on 18 December 2013

She was laid down on 27 October 2011 at Marinette Marine, Marinette, Wisconsin; launched on 18 December 2013; sponsored by Mrs. Sylvia M. Panetta, wife of Secretary of Defense Leon E. Panetta; and commissioned on 21 November 2015.

Over the 2015 Labor Day weekend holiday, it was reported that Milwaukee generated waves greater than five feet tall during test runs near Door County's Chambers Island which damaged more than 40 boats. Milwaukee was still in the custody of Marinette Marine at the time of the incident and was conducting pre-commissioning acceptance trials. In June 2016, the Coast Guard announced that their investigation was complete and that no enforcement action would be taken against any of the parties involved.

Milwaukee completed her acceptance trials prior to 1 November 2015 and was commissioned in Milwaukee, Wisconsin on 21 November 2015. She had improved systems as well as mission modules compared to USS Freedom and USS Independence, the first two Littoral Combat Ships. Her keel was laid down on 27 October 2011. Lockheed VP Joe North has said that starting with Milwaukee, the Lockheed LCS design is "done, locked and stable". This was after thirty or so changes from USS Fort Worth on top of hundreds of changes from USS Freedom. One of the improvements for Milwaukee was specially designed waterjets that replace the commercial versions used on previous Littoral Combat Ships. Ultimately, this design plan failed and the ship was decommissioned after combing gear failures and less than 8 years of service. The mission modules never panned out.

== Career ==
On 11 December 2015, on its way to San Diego from Halifax, Nova Scotia, the vessel experienced a "complete loss of propulsion" and was towed to Joint Expeditionary Base Little Creek, Virginia.

On 23 February 2016, CNN reported an update on the status of Milwaukee. In that update Navy Lt. Rebecca Haggard stated that Milwaukee "is designed to operate with gas turbine and diesel engines, which can operate in tandem or independently, In the case of Milwaukee when switching from one system to the other, a clutch failed to disengage as designed. Instead, the clutch remained spinning and some of the clutch gears were damaged." Lt. Haggard also stated that quick action by the crew prevented more serious problems and the damaged clutch was repaired in Virginia.

On 30 December 2016, Milwaukee participated in a homeport shift ceremony that took place at Naval Station Mayport. The ship never made it to her previously planned homeport of San Diego. She was assigned to Littoral Combat Ship Squadron Two.

On May 16, 2018, Milwaukee fired four "Longbow" Hellfire missiles at Fast Inshore Attack Craft (FIAC) targets, as part of an experimental platform development programme.

In 2021, the navy decided against decommissioning Milwaukee alongside several other older Freedom-class ships due to Milwaukee's active testing of a new anti-submarine mission package.

On 2 April 2022, Milwaukee returned to Mayport following a 15 week deployment to the 4th Fleet.

On 29 July 2022, a major electrical fire damaged the ship while she was docked in Jacksonville.

On 19 October 2022, Milwaukee left Mayport for her second deployment in 2022 to the 4th Fleet. The ship returned to Mayport in June 2023 after a 243 day deployment to Central and South America.

Milwaukee was decommissioned 8 September 2023 at a ceremony in Mayport.

== In popular culture ==
- USS Milwaukee is featured in the book Tom Clancy's Op-Center: Into the Fire.
