= USS Independence =

USS Independence may refer to:

- Independence (1776 brigantine) was a brigantine built at Kingston, Massachusetts in mid-1776. The brig served in the Massachusetts State Navy and cruised off New England until captured by the Royal Navy in early 1777.
- USS Independence (1776 sloop) was a 10-gun sloop commissioned in September 1776 and wrecked in 1778.
- USS Independence (1814) was the first ship of the line in the Navy, launched 22 June 1814 and finally used as a receiving ship until being decommissioned 1912.
- USS Independence (SP-3676) was a steamer commissioned 16 November 1918 and decommissioned 20 March 1919. She was later renamed Neville and used in World War II.
- USS Independence (CVL-22), was a light aircraft carrier, launched 22 August 1942; decommissioned 28 August 1946 and sunk during weapon testing 29 January 1951.
- USS Independence (CVA-62), was an aircraft carrier commissioned in 1959 and decommissioned in 1998.
- USS Independence (LCS-2) is a littoral combat ship commissioned in 2010 and decommissioned in 2021.
