= USS Independence (LCS-2) =

Independence-class littoral combat ship

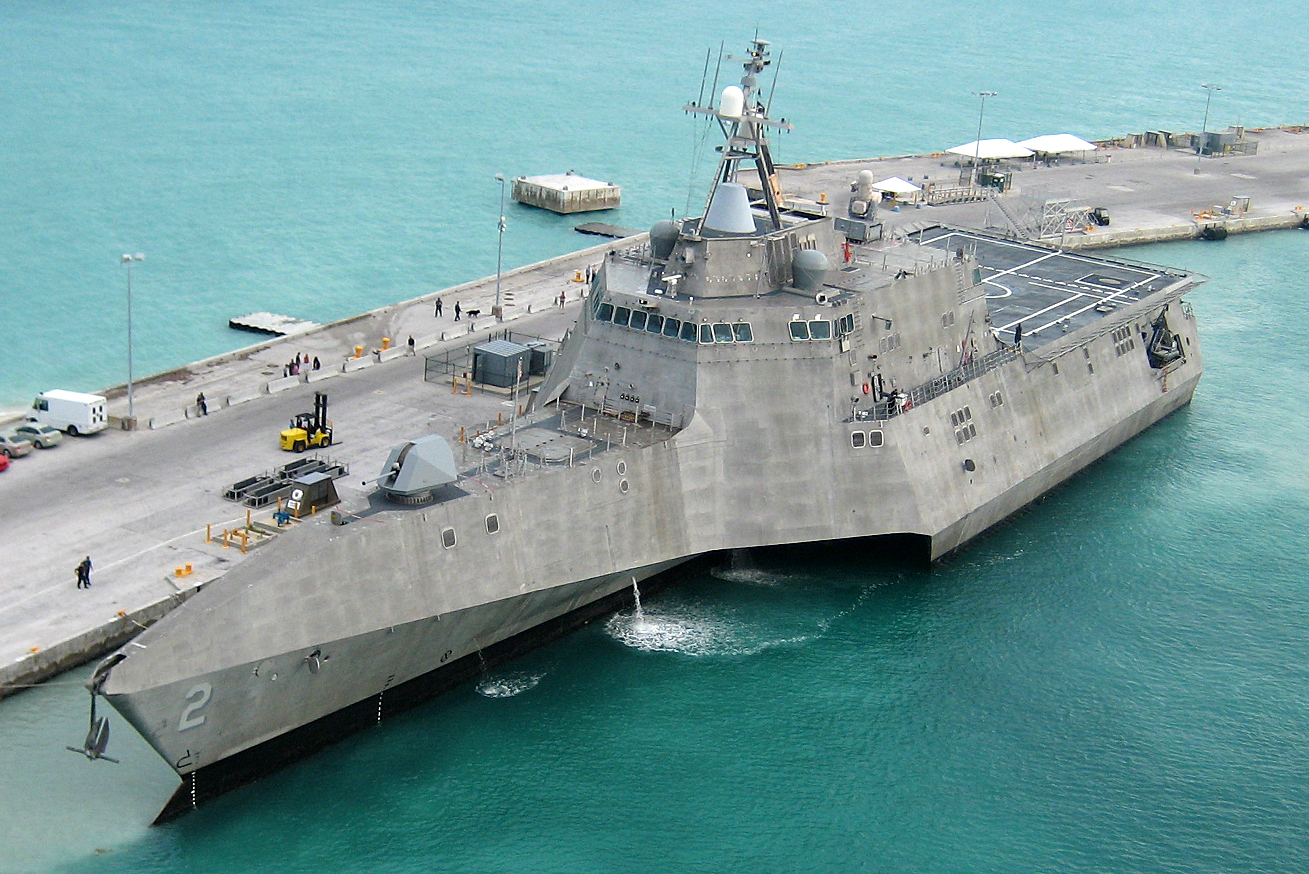
- USS Independence at Key West on 29 March 2010

History

United States
- Name: Independence
- Namesake: Independence
- Awarded: 14 October 2005
- Builder: Austal USA
- Laid down: 19 January 2006
- Launched: 26 April 2008
- Christened: 4 October 2008
- Commissioned: 16 January 2010
- Decommissioned: 29 July 2021
- Identification: Hull number: LCS-2
- Motto: Libertas Per Laborum Audentium; (Independence Through Bold Action)
- Status: Decommissioned
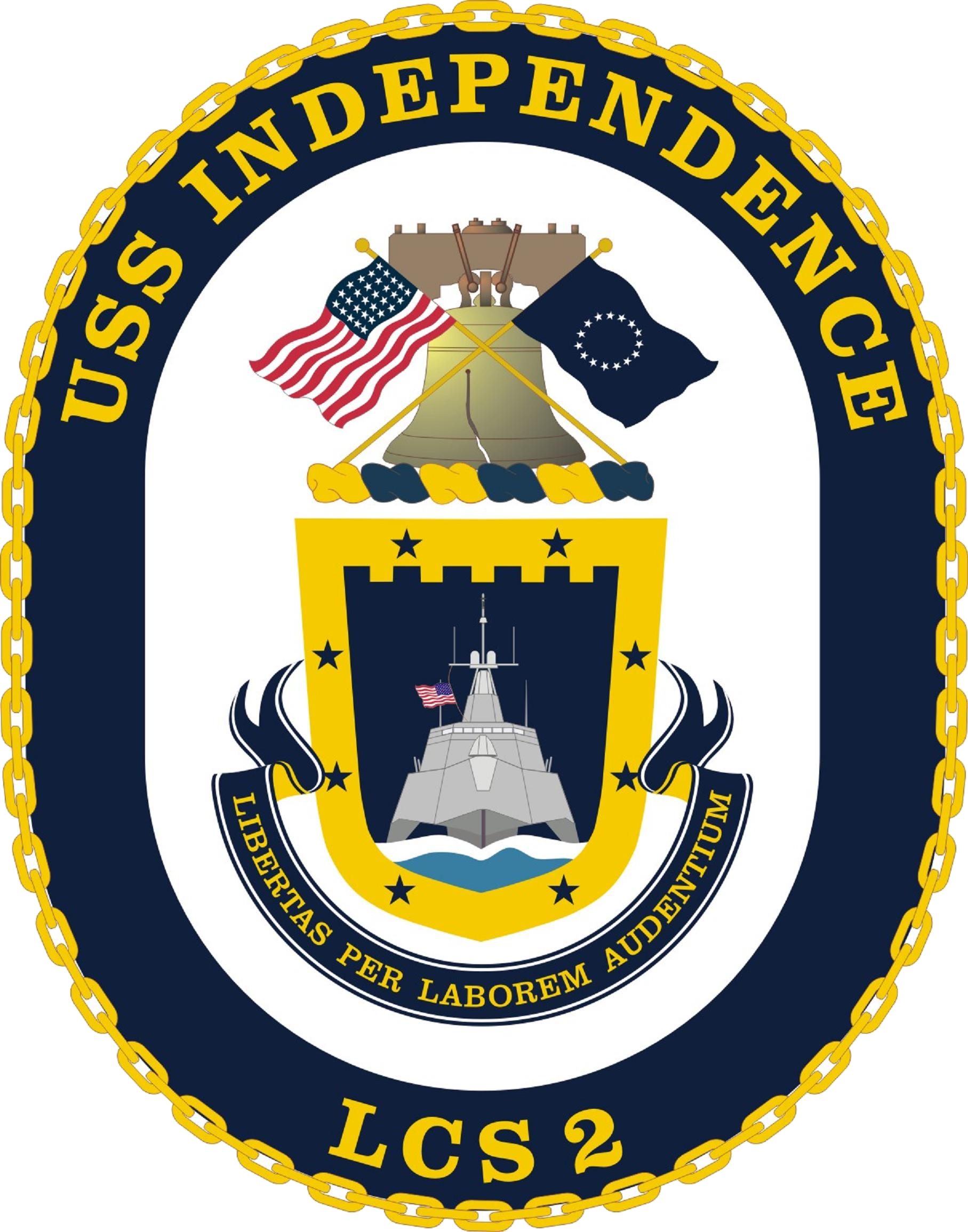
- Badge

General characteristics
- Class & type: Independence-class littoral combat ship
- Displacement: 2,271 long tons (2,307 t) light; 3,055 long tons (3,104 t) full; 784 long tons (797 t) deadweight
- Length: 128.4 m (421 ft)
- Beam: 31.6 m (104 ft)
- Draft: 14 ft (4.27 m)
- Propulsion: 2× MTU Friedrichshafen 20V 8000 Series diesel engines, 2× General Electric LM2500 gas turbines, 2× American VULKAN light weight multiple-section carbon fiber propulsion shaft lines, 4× Wärtsilä waterjets, retractable bow-mounted azimuth thruster, 4× diesel generators
- Speed: 44 knots (51 mph; 81 km/h)
- Range: 4,300 nm at 18 knots
- Capacity: 210 t (210 long tons; 230 short tons)
- Complement: 43 core crew (11 officers, 32 enlisted) plus up to 35 mission crew
- Sensors & processing systems: SAAB Sea GIRAFFE 3D air and surface search radar; Sperry Marine BridgeMaster E navigational radar; AN/KAX-2 electro-optical sensor with TV and FLIR; Northrop Grumman ICMS (Integrated Combat Management System)
- Electronic warfare & decoys: ITT Corporation ES-3601 ESM system; 4× SRBOC decoy launchers for chaff and infrared decoys; BAE Systems NULKA active radar decoy system
- Armament: 1× BAE Systems Mk 110 57 mm gun; 4× .50 cal (12.7 mm) guns (2 aft, 2 forward); 1× Raytheon SeaRAM CIWS; Other weapons as part of mission modules
- Aircraft carried: 2× MH-60R/S Seahawk; MQ-8 Fire Scout

USS Independence (LCS-2) is the lead ship of the Independence-class of littoral combat ships. It is the sixth ship of the United States Navy to be named for the concept of independence. The design was produced by the General Dynamics consortium for the Navy's LCS program, and competes with the Lockheed Martin–designed Freedom variant.

Independence, delivered to the Navy at the end of 2009, was a high-speed, small-crew corvette, although the U.S. Navy does not use the term, intended to operate in littoral waters. It can swap out various systems to take on various missions, including finding and destroying mines, hunting submarines in and near shallow water, and fighting small boats (it is not intended to fight warships). The ship is a trimaran design with a wide beam above the waterline that supports a larger flight deck than those of the Navy's much larger destroyers and cruisers, as well as a large hangar and a similarly large mission bay below. The trimaran hull also exhibits low hydrodynamic drag, allowing efficient operation on two diesel-powered water jets at speeds up to 18 knots (33 km/h; 21 mph), and high-speed operation on two gas turbine–powered water jets at a sustainable 44 knots (81 km/h; 51 mph) and even faster for short periods.

On 29 July 2021, the Navy decommissioned Independence during a private ceremony at Naval Base San Diego, California.

== Description ==
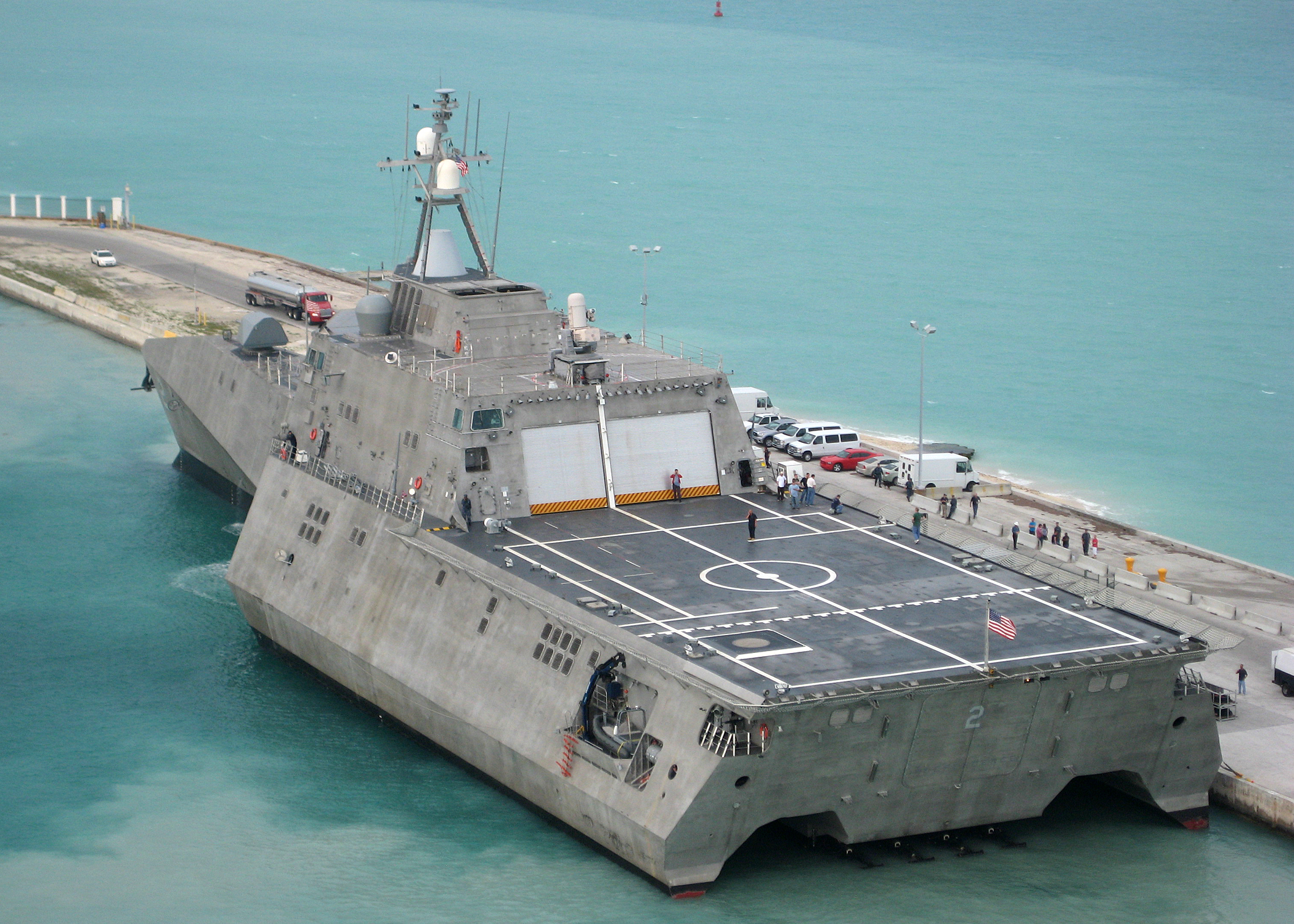
Helicopter facilities and the mission bay dominate the stern of the Independence class.

The design for Independence is based on a high-speed trimaran (Benchijigua Express) hull built by Austal (Henderson, Australia). The 418-foot (127 m) surface combatant design requires a crew of 43 sailors.

With 11,000 cubic meters (390,000 cu ft) of payload volume, it was designed to carry two mission modules, allowing the ship to do multiple missions without having to be refitted. The flight deck, at 1,030 m^{2} (11,100 sq ft), can support two SH-60 Seahawk helicopters, multiple unmanned aerial vehicles, or one CH-53 Sea Stallion-class helicopter. The trimaran aluminum hull will allow flight operations up to sea state 5.

Independence carries a default armament for self-defense. Unlike traditional combatants with fixed armament such as guns and missiles, tailored mission modules can be configured for one mission package at a time. Modules may consist of manned aircraft, unmanned vehicles, offboard sensors, or mission manning detachments.

The interior volume and payload is greater than some destroyers, allowing the ship to serve as a high-speed transport-and-maneuver platform. The 15,200-square-foot (1,410 m^{2}) mission bay takes up most of the deck below the hangar and flight deck. Packages the size of a 20-foot-long (6.1 m) shipping container can be airlifted onto the deck at sea, then moved by an elevator into the mission bay.

In addition to cargo or container-sized mission modules, the bay can carry four lanes of multiple Strykers, armored Humvees, and their associated troops. A side ramp allows vehicle roll-on/roll-off loading to a dock and would have allowed the ship to transport the cancelled Expeditionary Fighting Vehicle.

Bunks and living spaces are below the bridge. The helm is controlled by joysticks instead of a traditional steering wheel.

Independence also has an integrated LOS Mast, Sea Giraffe 3D radar and SeaStar Safire FLIR. Side and forward surfaces are angled to reduce the ship's radar profile. In addition, H-60-series helicopters provide airlift, rescue, anti-submarine, radar picket and anti-ship capabilities with torpedoes and missiles.

The Raytheon Evolved SeaRAM missile defense system is installed on the hangar roof. The SeaRAM combines the sensors of the Phalanx 1B close in weapon system with an eleven missile launcher for the Rolling Airframe Missile (RAM), creating an autonomous system.

Northrop Grumman has demonstrated sensor fusion of on and off board systems in the Integrated Combat Management System (ICMS) used on Independence.

Instead of the heavily protected Combat Information Center found on other Navy warships, Independence has an Interior Communications Center that can be curtained off from the rest of the bridge.

Austal claims that Independence will use one-third less fuel than Freedom, but the Congressional Budget Office found that fuel would account for 18 percent or less of the total lifetime cost of Freedom. While it was unable to judge the fuel usage of Independence, the higher purchase price of Independence would dominate its lifetime costs.

== History ==
The contract was awarded to General Dynamics in July 2003. The contract to build it was then awarded to Austal USA of Mobile, Alabama, on 14 October 2005 and its keel was laid down on 19 January 2006. Delivery to the United States Navy was scheduled for December 2008.

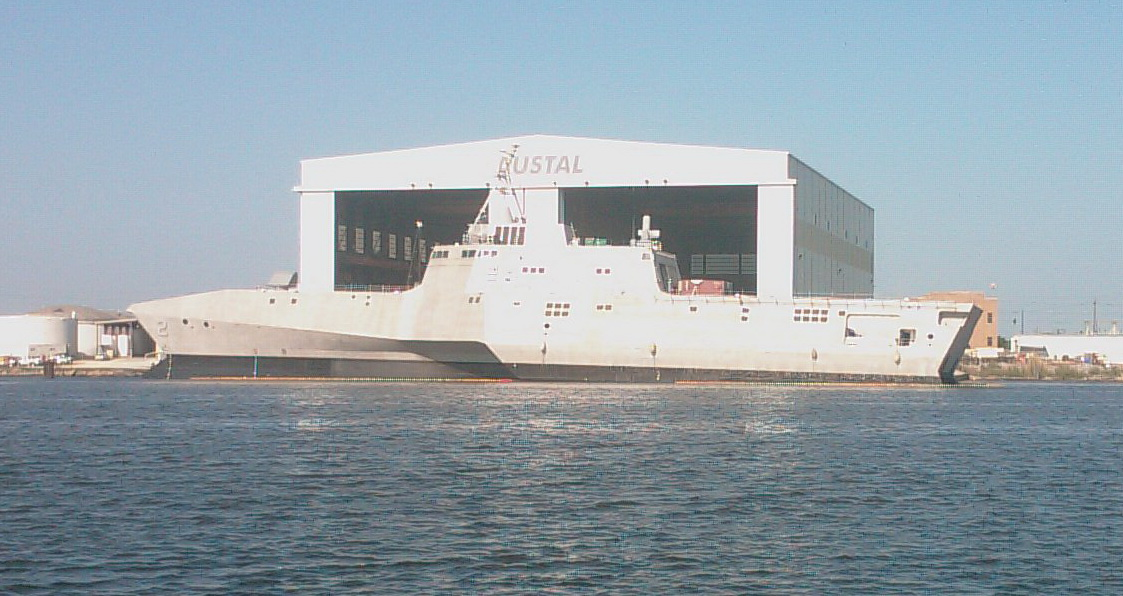
Side view of Independence on 29 April 2008

The originally planned second General Dynamics ship (LCS-4) was canceled on 1 November 2007. On 1 May 2009, a second vessel was reordered by the Navy, USS Coronado. The keel was laid on 17 December 2009, with delivery scheduled for May 2012. The ship was delivered 27 September 2013.

For fiscal year 2010, the Navy planned a competition between Lockheed Martin and General Dynamics for the next three littoral combat ships, with the winner building two ships and the loser only one. Independence was christened 5 October 2008 by Doreen Scott, wife of 10th Master Chief Petty Officer of the Navy Terry D. Scott.

Navy leaders said that the fixed price competition offered the Austal design an equal shot, in spite of its excess size, cost and limited service. In June 2009, the development and construction of Independence was 220% over-budget. The total projected cost for the ship was $704 million. The Navy had originally projected the cost at $220 million. Independence began builder's trials near Mobile, Alabama on 2 July 2009, three days behind schedule because of maintenance issues.

In response to problems with the propulsion plant (the port gas turbine shaft seal sprang a leak), General Dynamics rearranged builder's trials to test other systems until this was fixed. The ship completed builder's trials on 21 October 2009 and acceptance trials on 19 November 2009.

On 9 December 2009, the Navy announced that the ship had completed the first INSURV inspection. The inspection found 2,080 discrepancies, including 39 high-priority deficiencies, but concluded that all could be resolved before the Navy accepted the ship as scheduled. The ship was delivered to the Navy on 17 December 2009, and the service officially accepted her the next day. However, the ship was found to be incomplete and a second round of acceptance trials was scheduled for 2011.

The ship was commissioned on 16 January 2010 at Mobile, Alabama and completed her maiden voyage in April 2010.

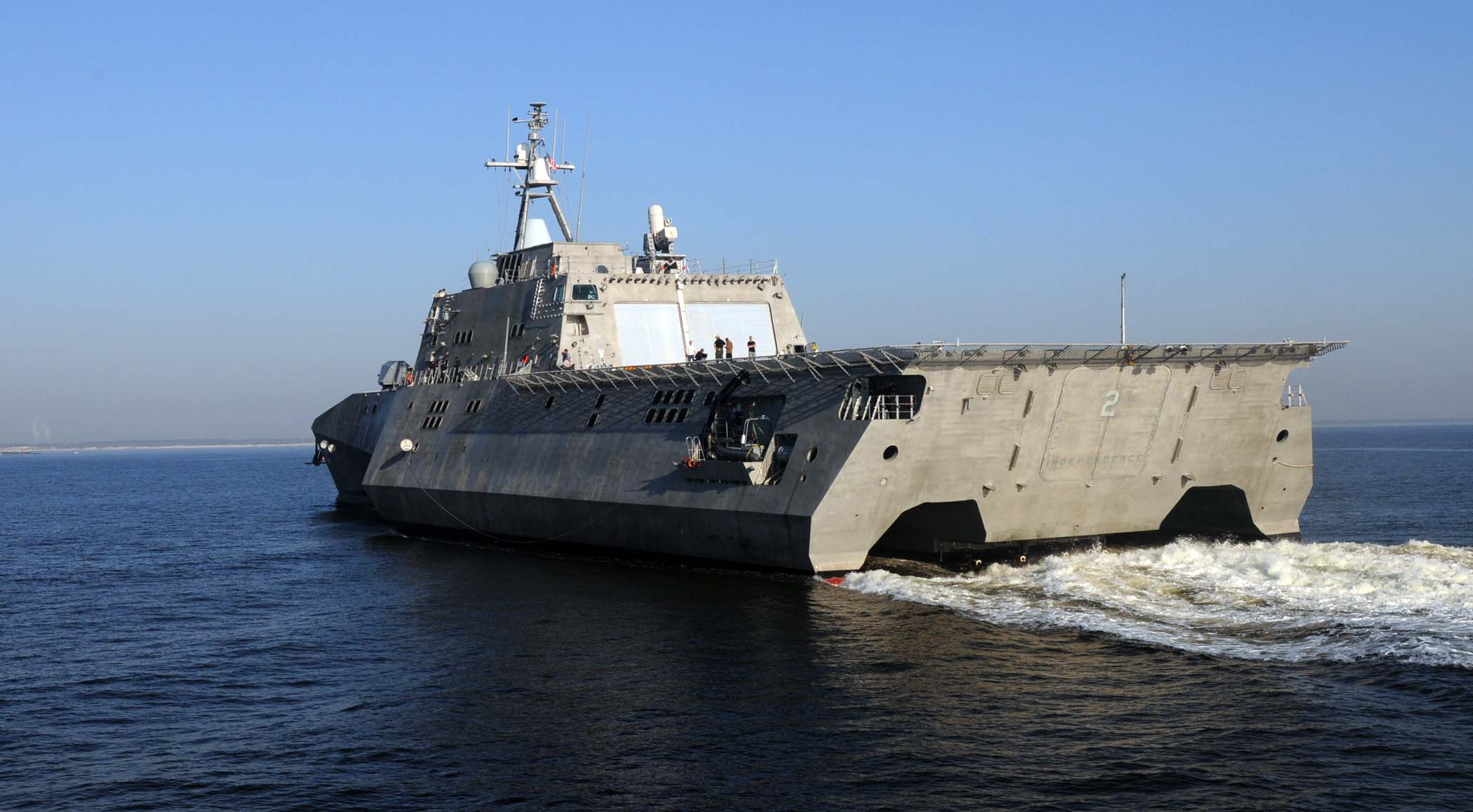
Rear view of Independence approaching Mayport, Florida, on 2 April 2010

In 2010, the Navy asked for an additional $5.3 million to correct problems found in the sea trials. Galvanic corrosion caused by an aluminum hull acts as an anode in contact with the stainless steel propulsion system with sea water acting as an electrolyte, and electrical currents not fully isolated, caused "aggressive corrosion." Prior to the discovery of corrosion, Austal and General Dynamics had both agreed to dissolve their relationship with each other and agree to act as competitors in March. The cause of the split was due to the planned competition between Lockheed Martin and General Dynamics. Prior to the split, General Dynamics was to continue maintenance on the ship after it entered service. In 2011 the corrosion problem was found to be even worse than expected and repair would require time in a drydock to completely remove the water jets. In response, Austal blamed the U.S. Navy for not properly maintaining the ship. However the Navy replied that the electrical insulation had been improperly installed during construction. Later Austal said it had found a fix for the problem that would be tested on the third Austal LCS ship. In 2011, seven U.S. senators sent a letter to the Department of Defense questioning the management of the corrosion problems of Independence. In July 2011, a Navy Public Information Officer reported that a "cathodic protection system" would be installed on the ship. Such systems generally consist of strategically located deposits of "sacrificial metals" which act as an anode to reduce corrosion of the metal being protected.

On 2 May 2012, Independence completed her maiden voyage to its homeport, Naval Base San Diego, CA, where she was assigned to Littoral Combat Ship Squadron One.

In 2013, leaked U.S. Navy documents that showed that the ship was originally to be named USS Liberty, but the name was changed due to the controversial 1967 USS Liberty incident. This was uncovered by a Freedom of Information Act request that showed Liberty appearing on a list of recommended names to the Secretary of the Navy; the Naval Vessel Register identified LCS-2 as the Liberty before it was changed to the Independence.

On 19 May 2014, a spokesman for the U.S. Pacific Fleet confirmed that Independence would take part in RIMPAC 2014, reversing an earlier decision to keep littoral combat ships in southern California to carry out tests and various exercises. The ship would join more than two dozen foreign ships and a similar number of Navy ships in exercises off Hawaii from 6–25 July 2014. Independence was operating out of San Diego testing her MCM package when it was decided that it would take part in RIMPAC 2014, so the ship returned to port and switched it out for the surface warfare package in 96 hours. The first RIMPAC scenario was acting as plane guard for the aircraft carrier USS Ronald Reagan, for which it received "Bravo Zulu" (well done) from the strike group commander. In a four-hour event, the ship played opposition force alone against four other vessels, going nearly two hours without being located. Independence performed its first joint combined operations, acting as an afloat forward staging base for Navy and foreign fast-roping helicopter operating teams, and operated two helicopters near simultaneously while launching and recovering boats. The ship performed two to three tasks per day and completed them all while not needing to pull into port and being refueled twice. RIMPAC exercises were at a much higher operating tempo than previous tests, and Independence accomplished all tasks without experiencing any major difficulties.

Independence tested the MCM and ASW mission modules for the littoral combat ship designs during the summer of 2014. It was the first time the ship had conducted end-to-end missions, and the crew successfully performed at the high operational tempos. When moving through a mock minefield twice, the suite of counter-mine technologies detected mines each instance and completed search, detect, and destroy phases; it was also the first time all three components of the MCM package had been integrated on board the ship. Testing of the ASW package was conducted in September, where for the first time both the active and passive sonars were towed at once to make sure the two systems did not cross.

On 20 June 2020, the US Navy announced that they would be taking Independence out of commission in March 2021, and placing it, along with Freedom, Fort Worth, and Coronado in reserve. On 29 July 2021, the Navy decommissioned Independence during a private ceremony at Naval Base San Diego, CA.

As of 2022, Independence resides with the US Naval Inactive Ship Maintenance Facility in Bremerton, WA.

== See also ==
- Absalon-class command and support ship
- Sea Shadow (IX-529) United States
- USS Independence, United States
- Sea Fighter, United States
- RV Triton, a trimaran concept for Britain's Future Surface Combatant program
- Future Surface Combatant, United Kingdom
- La Fayette-class frigate
- Skjold-class patrol boat
- Visby-class corvette
- Houbei-class missile boat
- Braunschweig-class corvette
- Milgem-class corvette
- F125-class frigate
- Buque de Acción Marítima, modular ship with several variants for the Spanish Navy built by Navantia, Spain
