= USS Little Rock (LCS-9) =

Freedom-class littoral combat ship of the US Navy

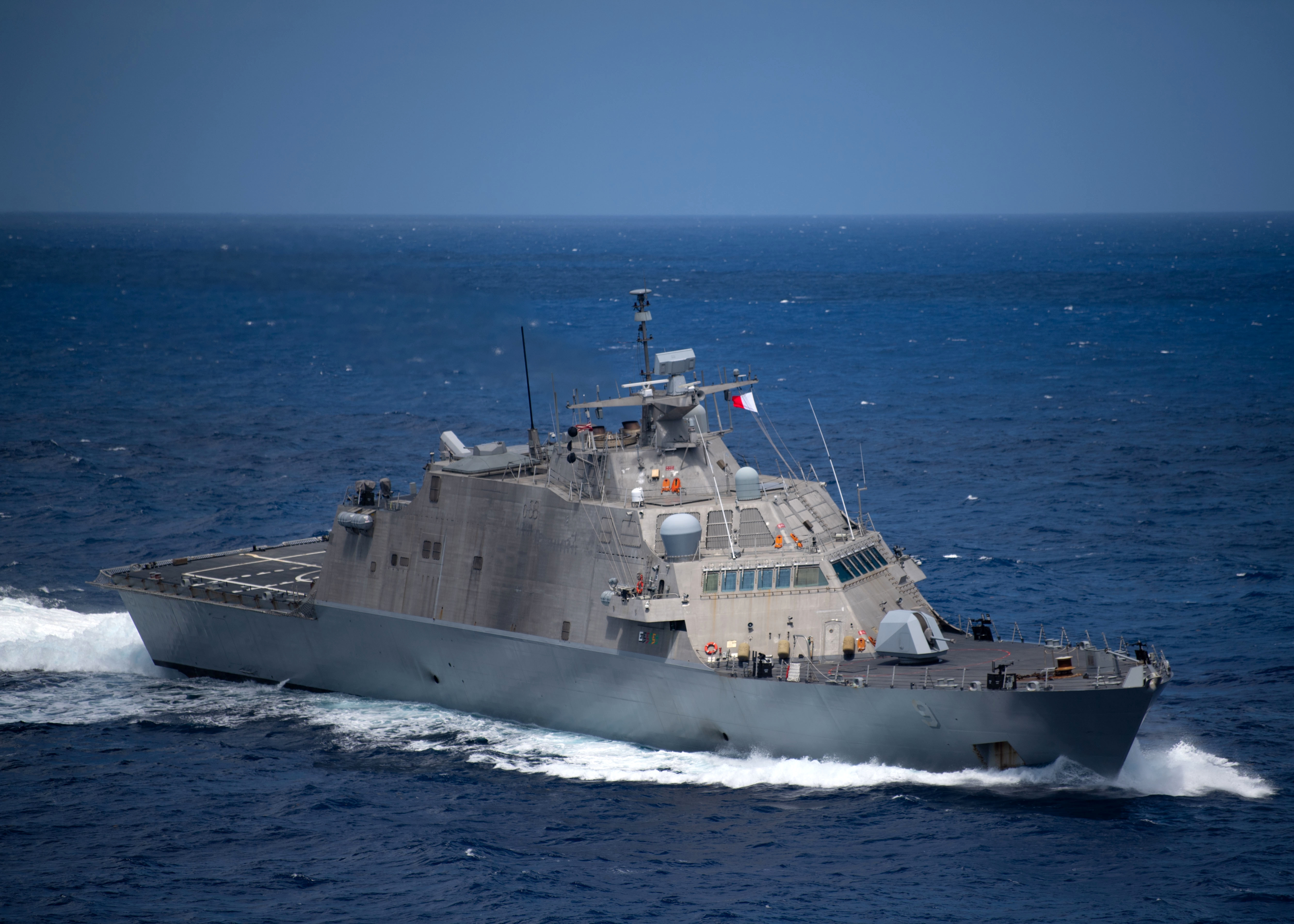
- USS Little Rock underway on 16 February 2020

History

United States
- Name: Little Rock
- Namesake: Little Rock
- Awarded: 29 December 2010
- Builder: Marinette Marine
- Laid down: 27 June 2013
- Launched: 18 July 2015
- Sponsored by: Janée L. Bonner
- Christened: 18 July 2015
- Acquired: 25 September 2017
- Commissioned: 16 December 2017
- Decommissioned: 29 September 2023
- Identification: Hull number: LCS-9
- Motto: Back With A Vengeance
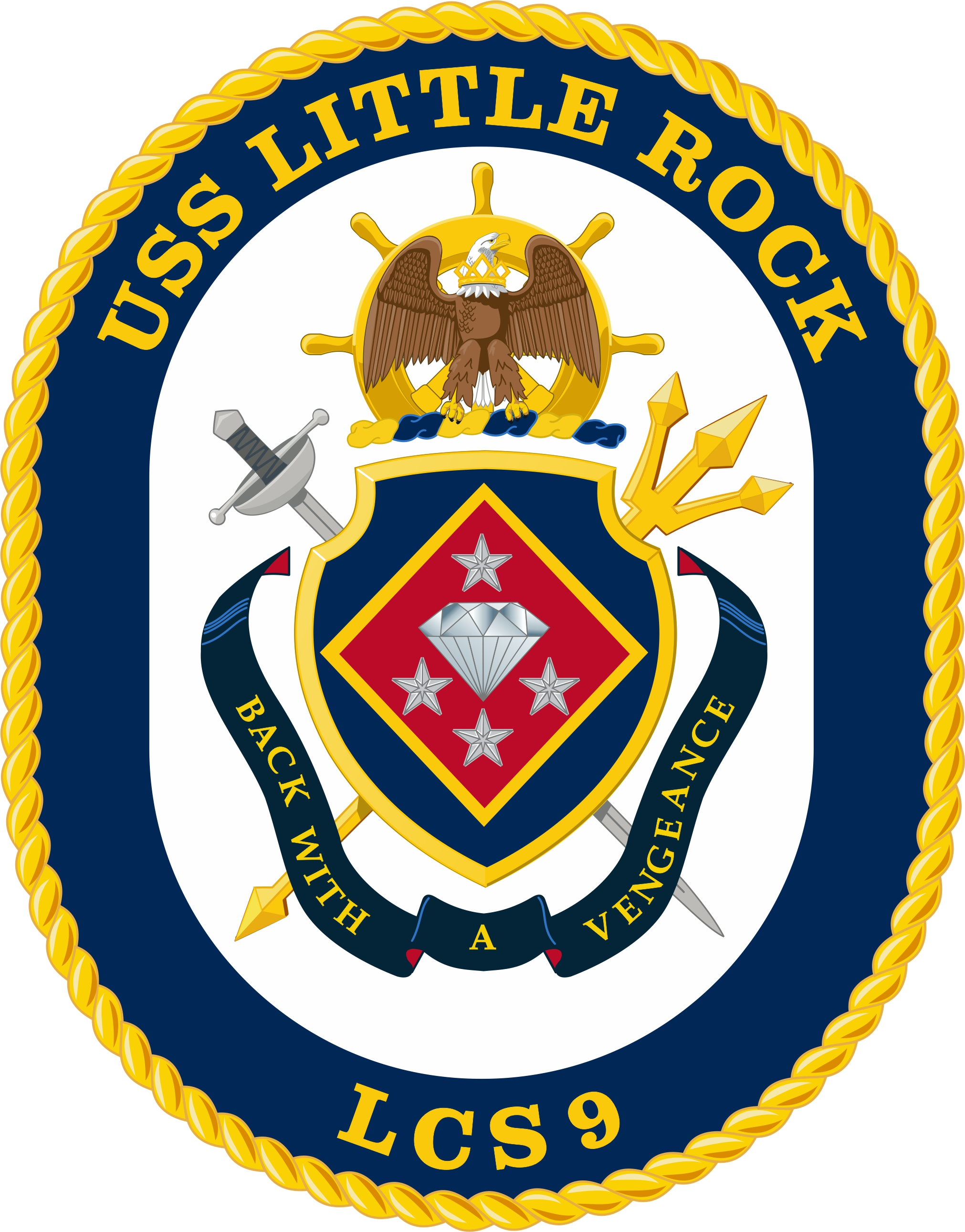
- Badge

General characteristics
- Class & type: Freedom-class littoral combat ship
- Displacement: 3,500 metric tons (3,900 short tons) full load
- Length: 378.3 ft (115.3 m)
- Beam: 57.4 ft (17.5 m)
- Draft: 13.0 ft (4.0 m)
- Installed power: 4 Isotta Fraschini V1708 diesel engines with Hitzinger generator units rated at 800 kW each.
- Propulsion: 2 Rolls-Royce MT30 36 MW gas turbines, 2 Colt-Pielstick diesel engines, 4 Rolls-Royce waterjets
- Speed: 45 knots (52 mph; 83 km/h) (sea state 3)
- Range: 3,500 nmi (6,500 km) at 18 knots (21 mph; 33 km/h)
- Endurance: 21 days (336 hours)
- Boats & landing craft carried: 11 m RHIB, 40 ft (12 m) high-speed boats
- Complement: 15 to 50 core crew, 75 mission crew (Blue and Gold crews)
- Armament: BAE Systems Mk 110 57 mm gun; RIM-116 Rolling Airframe Missiles; Honeywell Mk 50 torpedo; NETFIRES PAM missile in the ASuW module; 2 × .50 cal (12.7 mm) machine guns; Can be fitted with up to 4 Bushmaster 30 mm guns
- Aircraft carried: 2 MH-60R/S Seahawks; MQ-8 Fire Scout
- Aviation facilities: Flight deck, hangar

USS Little Rock (LCS-9) is a decommissioned Freedom-class littoral combat ship (LCS) of the United States Navy. She is the second ship named after Little Rock, the capital city of Arkansas.

== Design ==
In 2002, the U.S. Navy initiated a program to develop the first of a fleet of littoral combat ships. The Navy initially ordered two monohull ships from Lockheed Martin, which became known as the Freedom-class littoral combat ships after the first ship of the class, USS Freedom. Odd-numbered U.S. Navy littoral combat ships are built using the Freedom-class monohull design, while even-numbered ships are based on a competing design, the trimaran hull Independence-class littoral combat ship from General Dynamics. The initial order of littoral combat ships involved a total of four ships, including two of the Freedom-class design. Little Rock is the fifth Freedom-class littoral combat ship to be built.

Little Rock includes additional stability improvements over the original Freedom design; the stern transom was lengthened and buoyancy tanks were added to the stern to increase weight service and enhance stability. The ship will also feature automated sensors to allow "conditions-based maintenance" and reduce crew overwork and fatigue issues that Freedom had on her first deployment.

== Construction and career ==
Little Rock in Buffalo

The ship's estimated construction costs are between $300 million and $350 million. The keel laying ceremony for Little Rock was on 27 June 2013. The mast stepping ceremony took place on 23 April 2015, followed by the christening ceremony on 18 July 2015.

On 25 August 2017, Little Rock, the fifth Freedom-variant LCS built by Lockheed Martin and Fincantieri Marinette Marine, completed acceptance trials on Lake Michigan with the highest score of any Freedom-variant LCS to date, earning the right to fly brooms atop her mast signifying a clean sweep of the ship's sea trials. The ship was delivered to the United States Navy on 25 September 2017. The ship was commissioned alongside the earlier Galveston-class cruiser USS Little Rock at Buffalo, New York on 16 December 2017. The commissioning ceremony marked the first time a U.S. Navy ship has commissioned next to her namesake.

After commissioning in Buffalo, New York, she headed to home port at Mayport Naval Station, Florida where she is assigned to Littoral Combat Ship Squadron Two. However, harsh winter conditions caused delays, preventing her from leaving St. Lawrence Seaway and she was stuck in ice at the port in Montreal. Little Rock remained there until 31 March 2018.

From 23 to 29 May 2018, Little Rock participated in New York City's annual Fleet Week celebrations. She was docked in Staten Island and open to public tours during the time.

In January 2020 it was reported that the ship would be equipped with a laser weapon system, most likely the 150-kilowatt class HELIOS system developed by Lockheed Martin.

On 6 February 2020 Little Rock began its first deployment. Deployed to U.S. Southern Command, the ship is expected to conduct operations in support of the multinational campaign Operation Martillo targeting international drug trafficking in Central American coastal waters. Little Rock deployed with the surface warfare mission-package and a U.S. Coast Guard law enforcement detachment.

Little Rock was planned to be inactivated in FY 2022, and to join the Out of Commission in Reserve (OCIR) list, but in the final 2022 budget, Congress blocked the Navy's request to retire the ship.

U.S. Navy officials first announced in 2022 that nine Freedom-class littoral combat ships would be decommissioned as part of the 2023 fiscal year budget. Little Rock was scheduled to be decommissioned on 31 March 2023 at Mayport Naval Station in Florida, but this was postponed to the last week of FY23.

Little Rock was decommissioned at Mayport Naval Station on 29 September 2023. She will be moored at the Philadelphia Navy Yard, while a possible sale to a foreign military is arranged.

On 29 March 2024, Little Rock was towed into the Philadelphia Navy Yard back basin.

== Gallery ==
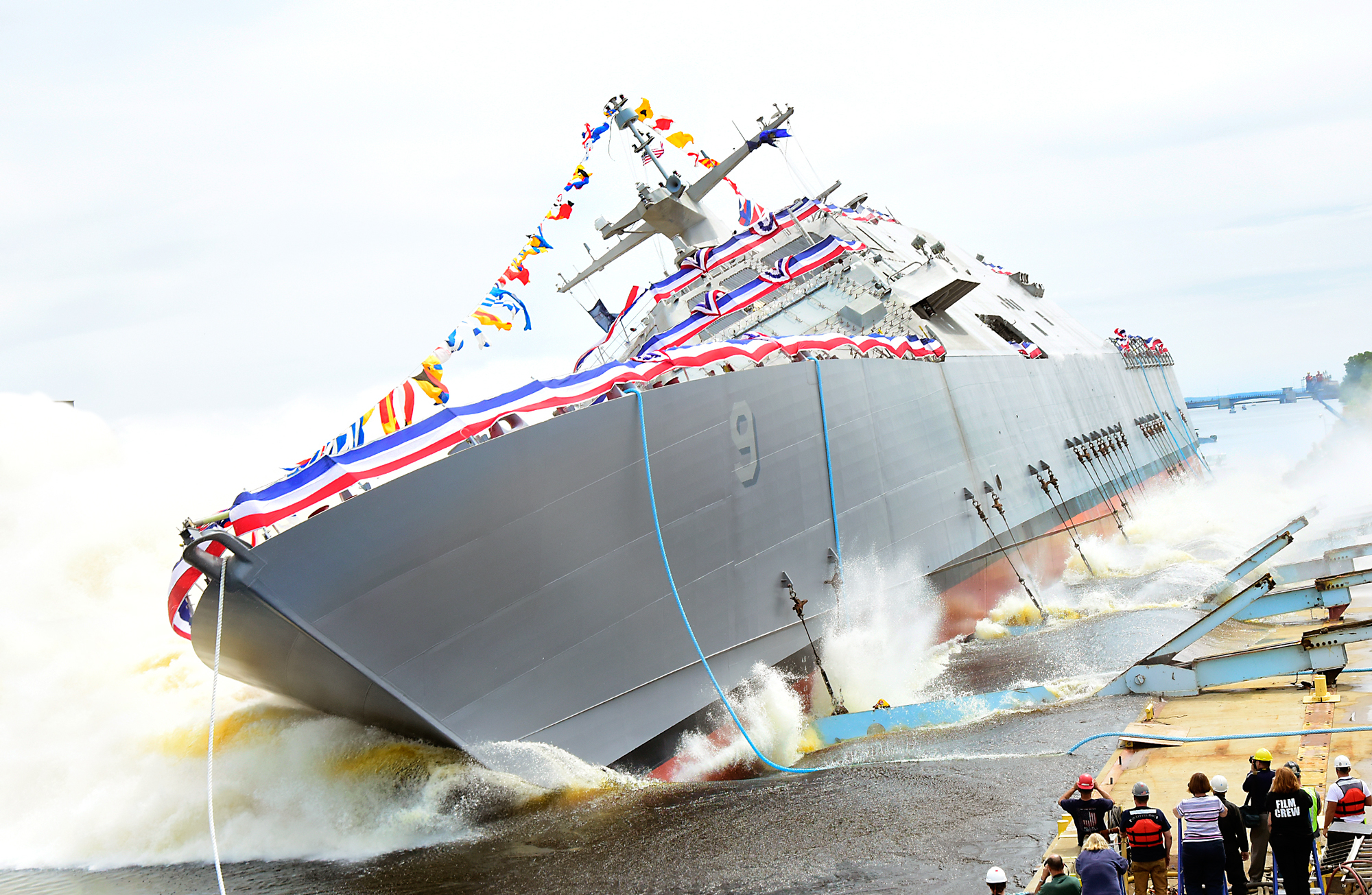
Launch of Little Rock on 18 July 2015

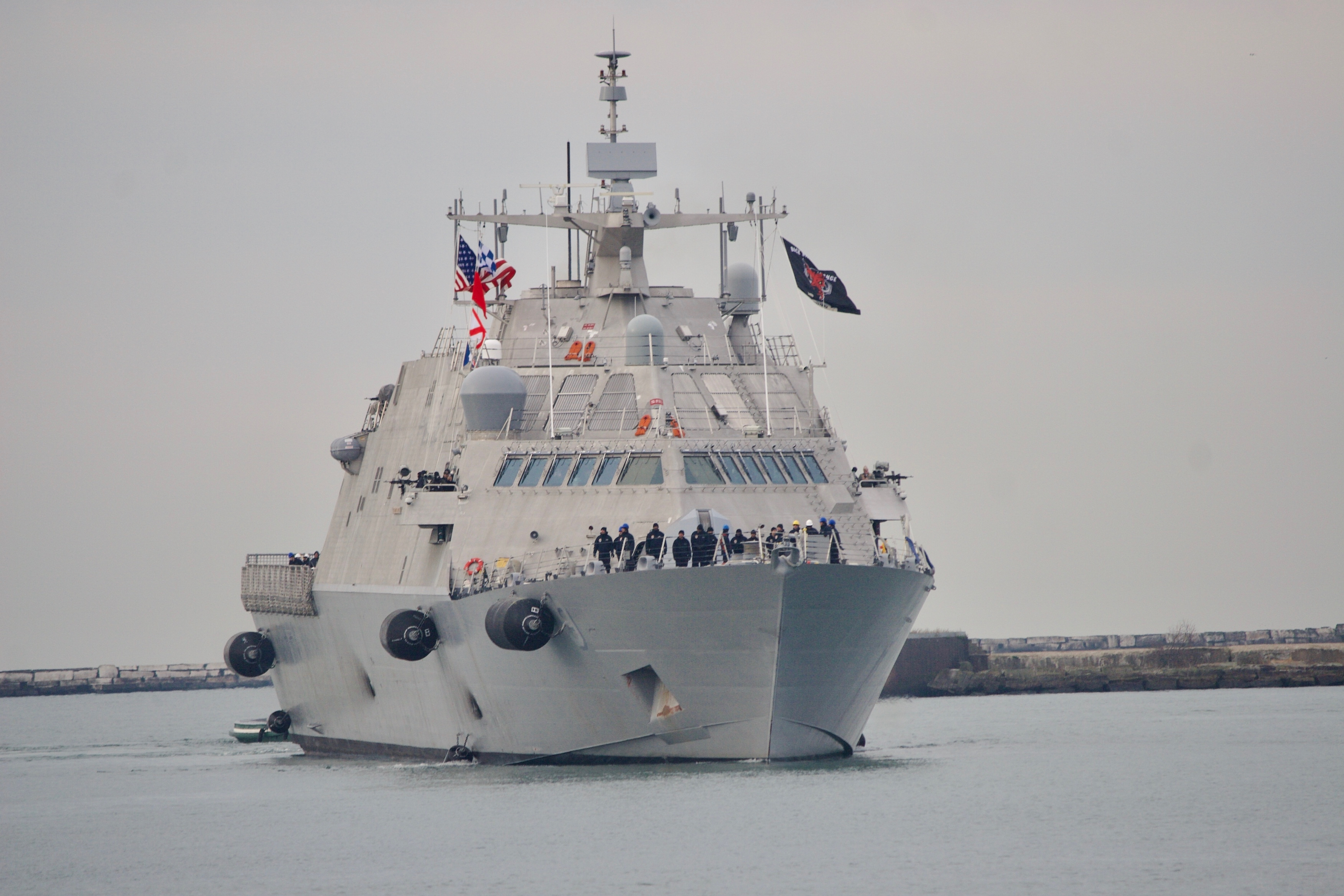
Little Rock enters Buffalo's Inner Harbor

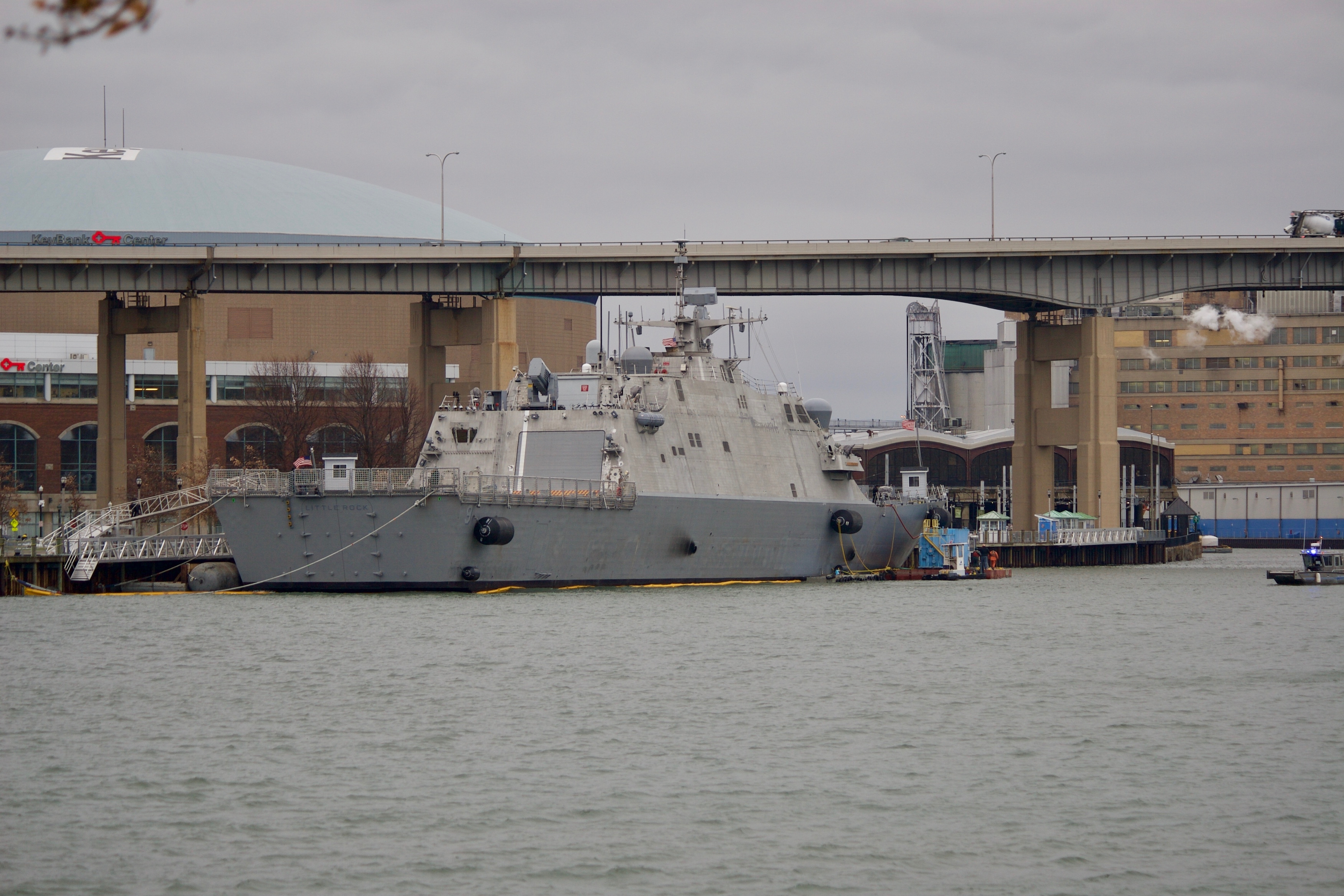
Little Rock docked at Canalside, Buffalo, New York

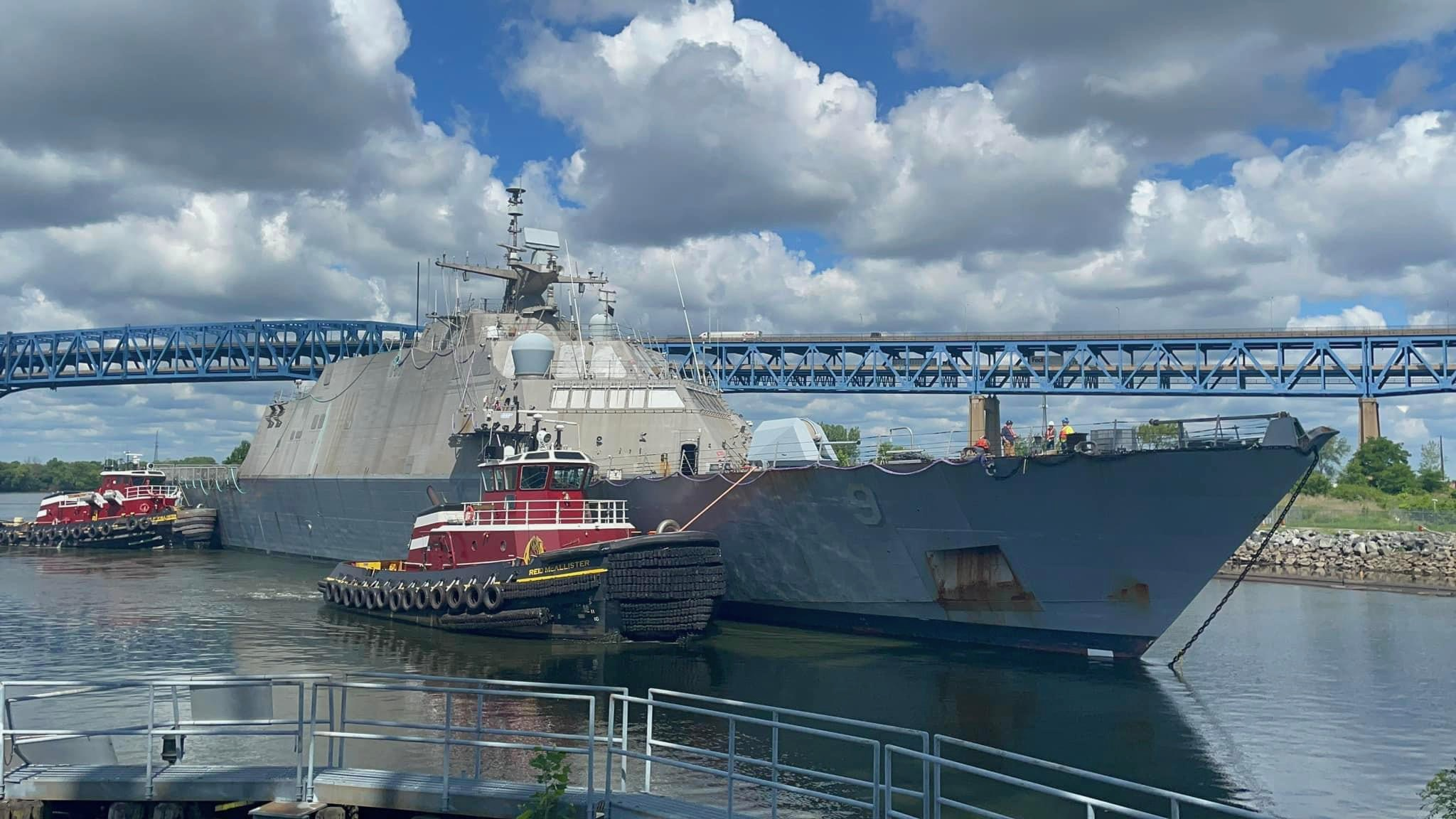
Little Rock entering Philadelphia Navy Yard
