= USS Fort Worth =

Freedom-class littoral combat ship of the US Navy

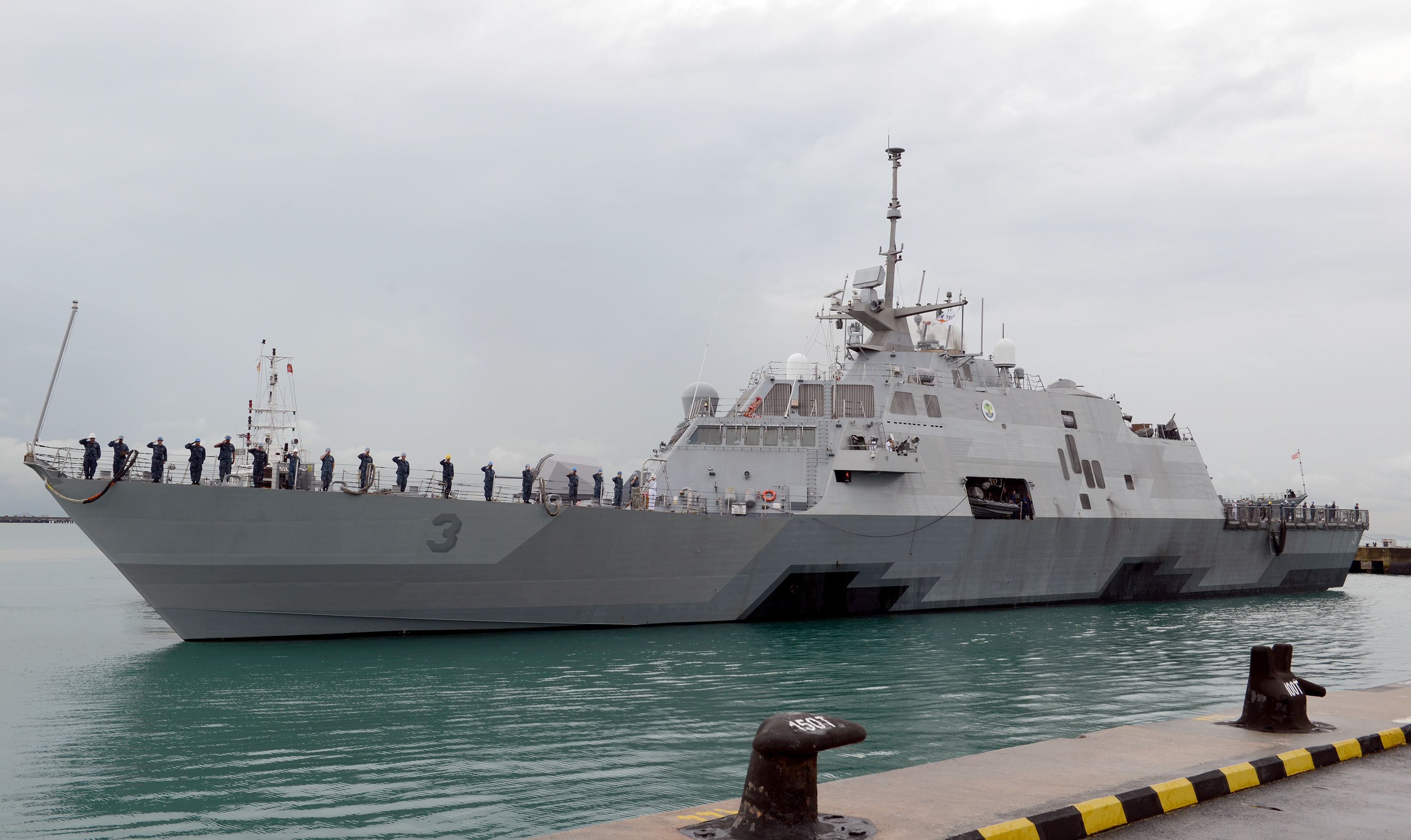
- USS Fort Worth on 22 November 2012

History

United States
- Name: Fort Worth
- Namesake: Fort Worth, Texas
- Awarded: 23 March 2009
- Builder: Marinette Marine
- Laid down: 11 July 2009
- Launched: 4 December 2010
- Sponsored by: Kay Granger
- Christened: 4 December 2010
- Acquired: 6 June 2012
- Commissioned: 22 September 2012
- Decommissioned: 29 July 2026
- Home port: San Diego
- Motto: Grit and Tenacity
- Honors and awards: See Awards
- Status: Decommissioned
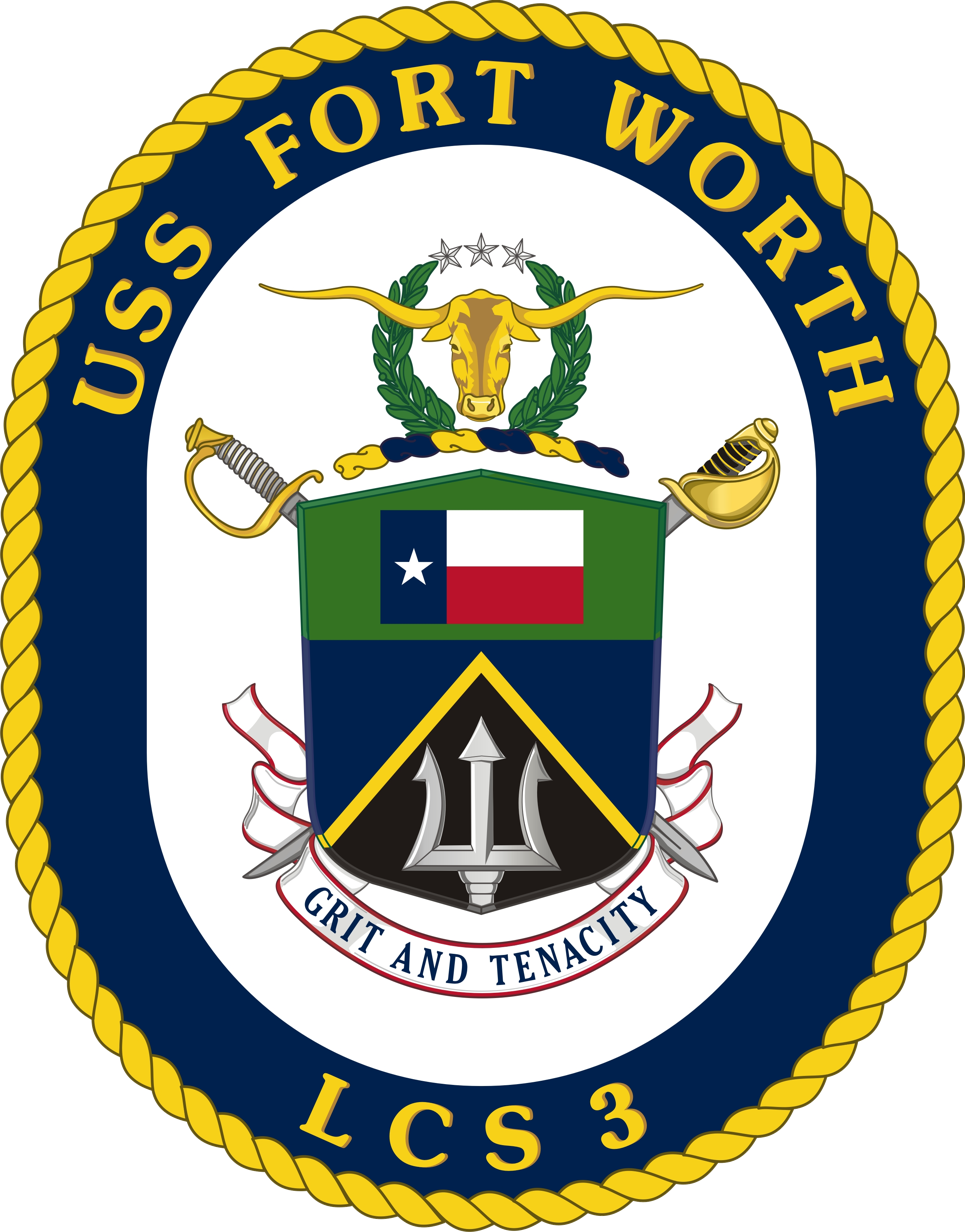
- Badge

General characteristics
- Class & type: Freedom-class littoral combat ship
- Displacement: 3,500 metric tons (3,900 short tons) (full load)
- Length: 387 ft (118 m)
- Beam: 58 ft (17.7 m)
- Draft: 13.0 ft (3.9 m)
- Propulsion: 2 Rolls-Royce MT30 36 MW gas turbines, 2 Colt-Pielstick diesel engines, 4 Rolls-Royce waterjets
- Speed: 45 knots (52 mph; 83 km/h) (sea state 3)
- Range: 3,500 nmi (6,500 km; 4,000 mi) at 18 knots (21 mph; 33 km/h)
- Endurance: 21 days (504 hours)
- Boats & landing craft carried: 11 m RHIB, 40 ft (12 m) high-speed boats
- Complement: 35–50 core crew, 75 mission crew (rotating crews)
- Armament: BAE Systems Mk 110 57 mm gun; RIM-116 Rolling Airframe Missiles; Mark 50 torpedo; 2 .50 cal (12.7 mm) guns; 2 Mk44 Bushmaster II cannons
- Aircraft carried: 2 MH-60R/S Seahawks; MQ-8 Fire Scout
- Notes: Electrical power is provided by 4 Isotta Fraschini V1708 diesel engines with Hitzinger generator units rated at 800 kW each.

USS Fort Worth (LCS-3) is a decommissioned Freedom-class littoral combat ship of the United States Navy. She is the first ship to be named after Fort Worth, Texas.

On 20 June 2020, the US Navy announced that they would be taking Fort Worth out of commission in March 2022, and placing her, along with Freedom, Independence, and Coronado in reserve.

On 18 June 2021, Naval News reported that Fort Worth would be inactivated in FY 2022 and put on the Out of Commission in Reserve (OCIR) list.

The Navy officially rescheduled USS Fort Worth to be inactivated in San Diego on 31 July 2026. She was decommissioned on 29 July.

== Design ==
In 2002, the U.S. Navy initiated a program to develop the first of a fleet of littoral combat ships. The Navy initially ordered two monohull ships from Lockheed Martin, which became known as the Freedom-class littoral combat ships after the first ship of the class, USS Freedom. Odd-numbered U.S. Navy littoral combat ships are built using the Freedom-class monohull design, while even-numbered ships are based on a competing design, the trimaran hull Independence-class littoral combat ship from General Dynamics. The initial order of littoral combat ships involved a total of four ships, including two of the Freedom-class design. Fort Worth is the second Freedom-class littoral combat ship to be built.

Fort Worth includes additional stability improvements over the original Freedom design; the stern transom was lengthened and buoyancy tanks were added to the stern to increase weight service and enhance stability. The ship will also feature automated sensors to allow "conditions-based maintenance" and reduce crew overwork and fatigue issues that Freedom had on her first deployment.

== Construction and career ==
The ship's name was announced 6 March 2009. This was after a long public relations campaign by United States Representative Kay Granger, former Deputy Defense Secretary Gordon R. England, and others.

Fort Worth was built by Lockheed Martin at Marinette Marine shipyard in Marinette, Wisconsin. Her keel was laid in a ceremony on 11 July 2009.

The 80% completed ship was launched by the contractor on 4 December 2010. The vessel underwent sea trials in Lake Michigan during late 2011, with the completion of these trials announced on 24 October 2011. The ship successfully completed her acceptance trials, which also took place on Lake Michigan, on 4 May 2012. The inspectors found only ten severe deficiencies during the trials, an "exponential" improvement over Freedom.

Fort Worth was commissioned at Galveston, Texas on 22 September 2012. She has been assigned to Littoral Combat Ship Squadron One

In November 2013, Fort Worth conducted successful live-fire tests of her 57 mm (2.2 in) and 30 mm (1.2 in) cannons against small boat targets conducting swarm attacks. Fort Worth was moving fast through the water and assisted by an MH-60R helicopter. The ship's fire control system locked on to and fired on the small maneuvering boats in day and night situations with optical sights. The helicopter provided radar targeting which was passed on to the ship's fire control system. Fort Worth conducted additional evaluations of her surface warfare technologies in early 2014 in scenarios involving small boat swarms, engagements with the 57 mm gun, and search and seizure exercises. Evaluations were successful and validated the surface warfare mission package on the ship.

In November 2013, Fort Worth became the first LCS to test operations with the Northrop Grumman MQ-8 Fire Scout, a critical capacity for the LCS program.

On 10 September 2014, the commander of the U.S. 7th Fleet announced that Fort Worth would deploy to the Asia-Pacific region in January 2015. The ship was used to expand operational envelopes that were not done by the previous deployment of USS Freedom to the region, particularly concerning the mine counter measures (MCM) package. Emphasis on the MCM mission in and around the Korean Peninsula was based on periodic provocations made by North Korea, who in the past had deployed sea mines around the peninsula, sinking South Korean vessels. Additionally, Fort Worth was utilized to provide "non-traditional" maritime lift for U.S. Marines due to constraints in the number of big deck amphibious vessels available to the 7th Fleet. Operational trials made by Fort Worth also showed the potential to improve vertical lift replenishment in shallow waters. She deployed with the surface warfare mission-equipment package and was the first LCS deployment with the MQ-8B.

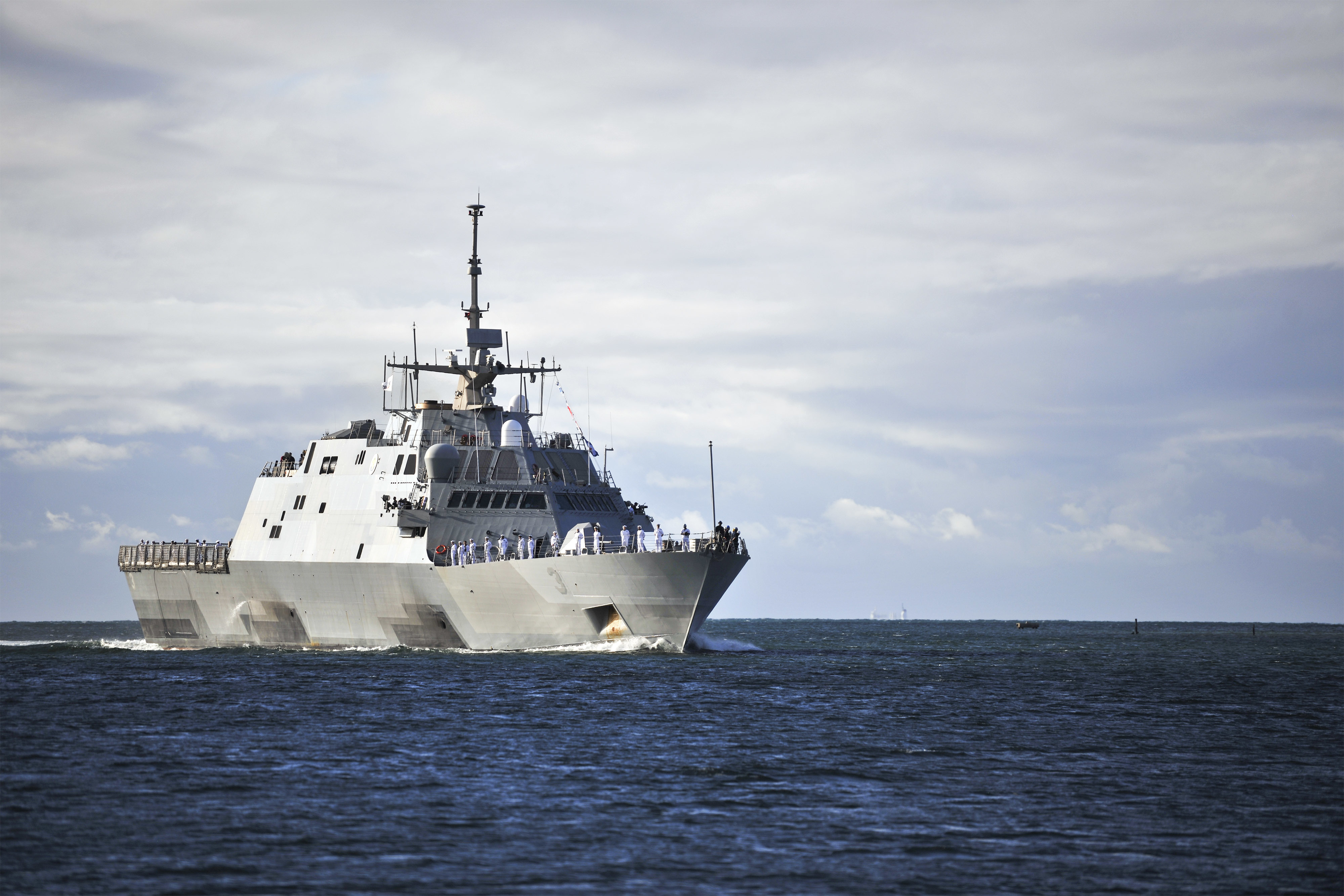
Fort Worth entering Pearl Harbor on 24 November 2014

Fort Worth departed her homeport of San Diego on 17 November 2014 for a 16-month rotational deployment to Singapore in support of the U.S. Navy's strategic rebalance to the Pacific. The ship is the first LCS to deploy under the "3-2-1" manning concept, swapping fully trained crews roughly every four months. Under this concept three rotational crews will support two LCS ships and maintain one deployed ship. Fort Worth also deployed with an aviation detachment from Helicopter Maritime Strike Squadron 35 (HSM-35) "Magicians", the U.S. Navy's first composite expeditionary helicopter squadron. The aviation detachment consisted of one MH-60R Seahawk helicopter and one Northrop Grumman MQ-8 Fire Scout unmanned autonomous helicopter. Fort Worth reached the 7th Fleet area of responsibility on 4 December 2014. The ship is expected to remain in the area until March 2016. It will be the longest deployment of a U.S. warship in 42 years, since the aircraft carrier USS Midway was under way for 327 days in 1973. The long deployment is to stress the Navy’s logistics capabilities and identify potential problems. Once the deployment is completed, Freedom will take the ship's place, returning to the area again.

On 31 December 2014, Fort Worth was dispatched from Singapore to the Java Sea to take part in the search for Indonesia AirAsia Flight 8501 that crashed on 28 December. On 3 January 2015 she arrived in the area to commence search efforts alongside the destroyer USS Sampson at the request of the Indonesian government. The maneuverability and shallow draft of the design allowed her to conduct expeditious visual and radar searches in the congested, shallow water environment. Both ships concluded search efforts on 15 January 2015 after performing 650 combined search hours. Fort Worth provided unique capabilities over the larger Sampson, and employed her two 11-metre (36 ft) RHIBs in 107 hours of operations. A team from Mobile Diving and Salvage Unit One that was embarked on the ship operated three Tow Fish side scan sonar systems that searched for wreckage for 78 hours and over 12 sq nmi (16 mi^{2}; 41 km^{2}). They also used the AN/PQS-2A passive sonar to listen for black box pings for 17 hours and over 24 sq nmi (32 mi^{2}; 82 km^{2}), as well as a remotely operated vehicle to investigate objects.

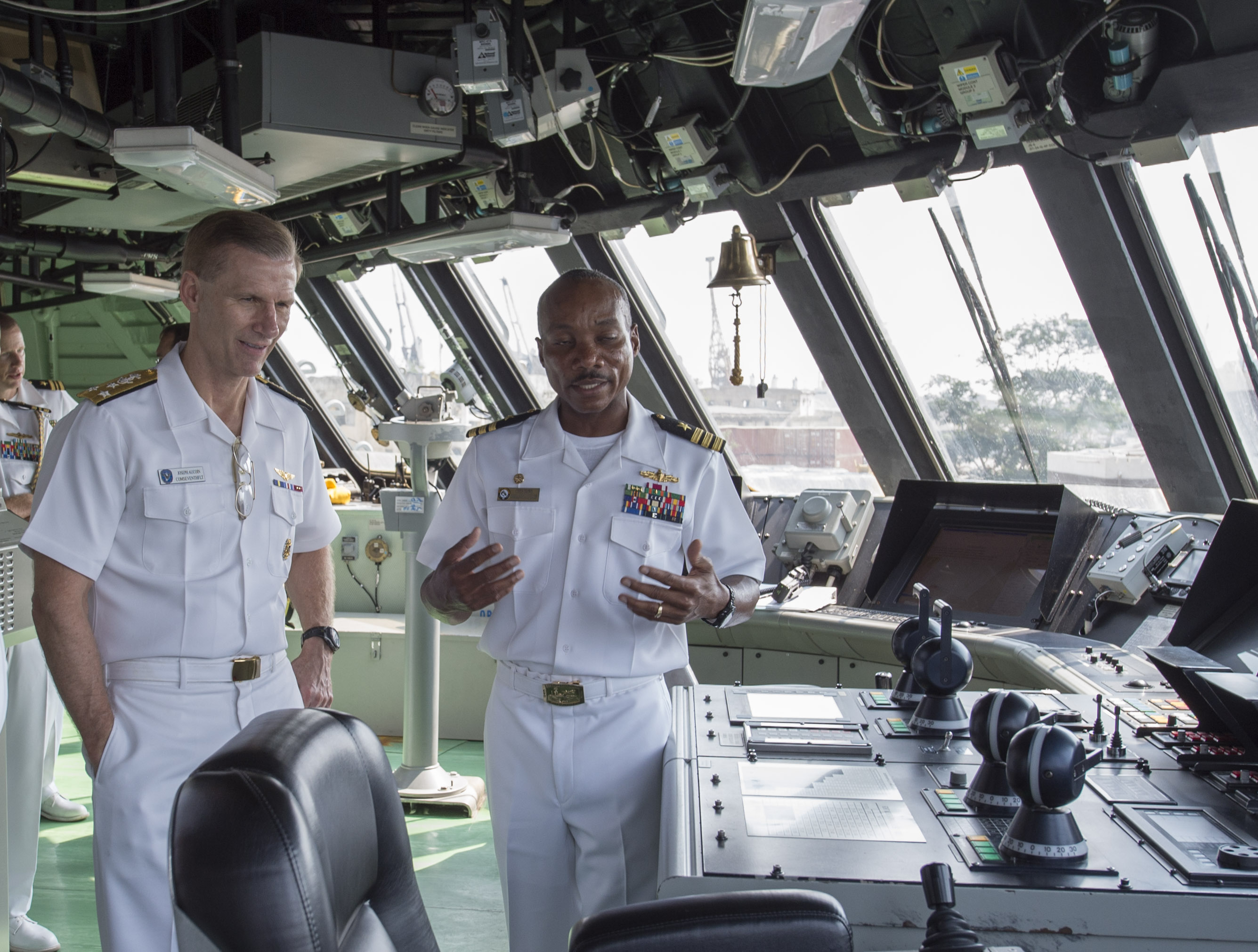
Vice Adm. Joseph Aucoin and Cmdr. Christopher Brown aboard Fort Worth on 15 October 2015

On 13 May 2015 the Chinese foreign ministry sent a complaint to the United States after Fort Worth made freedom of navigation passage near Spratly Islands claimed by China. During her deployment to the South China Sea, Fort Worth encountered several warships of the People's Liberation Army Navyputting the new rules of the Code for Unplanned Encounters at Sea into practice in a "professional" manner.

On 12 January 2016, according to a memo from the service, it was reported that Fort Worth was sidelined in port at Singapore indefinitely due to damage to her combining gear. As a result, on 28 March 2016, CDR Michael Atwell, the commander of LCS crew 101 (the LCS is manned by a rotating crew), was relieved of duty and was temporarily replaced by CDR Lex Walker, deputy commodore of Destroyer Squadron 7. The Navy cited the reason for CDR Atwell's removal was "due to a due to loss of confidence in Atwell's ability to command," stemming from initial findings into the incident that sidelined Fort Worth. It is estimated that the repairs to Fort Worth would cost between $20 and $30 million according to defense officials, and it was feared that the ship would need to be heavy-lifted back from Singapore to San Diego so she could be repaired during her scheduled overhaul. However, the USN announced on 13 April 2016, that Fort Worth would transit back to San Diego on her gas turbines instead, with the journey scheduled for Summer 2016. It was expected that Fort Worth would take six weeks to travel from Singapore to San Diego with several underway replenishments and planned fueling stops along the way. However, a subsequent assessment found that the damage to Fort Worth was less severe than initially believed, and her engines were repaired in Singapore by late July ahead of returning to the United States for further repairs.

In February 2020 it was announced that the Navy planned to retire Fort Worth and her sister ship Freedom after eight and twelve years of service, respectively. She was scheduled to be decommissioned on 31 March 2021 however, U.S. Representative Kay Granger blocked the move to decommission due to the ship's namesake and her close ties to the town of Fort Worth. In 2023, Fort Worth was used primarily as a carrier platform for testing drones while in port in San Diego.

After Representative Granger did not seek reelection in 2024, the commanding officer of USS Fort Worth told the USS Fort Worth’s Support Committee via letter on April 7, 2025 that the ship is entering “a new and final chapter,” as the Navy continues a multi-yearlong push toward taking all of its shoreside combat ships out of service and investing the resources elsewhere. The Navy officially rescheduled USS Fort Worth to be inactivated in San Diego on 31 July 2026. She was decommissioned on 29 July.

== Awards ==
- Battle E - (2013, 2019)
- CNO Afloat Safety Award (PACFLT) - (2014)
