= Sea Fighter =

Experimental US Navy littoral combat ship

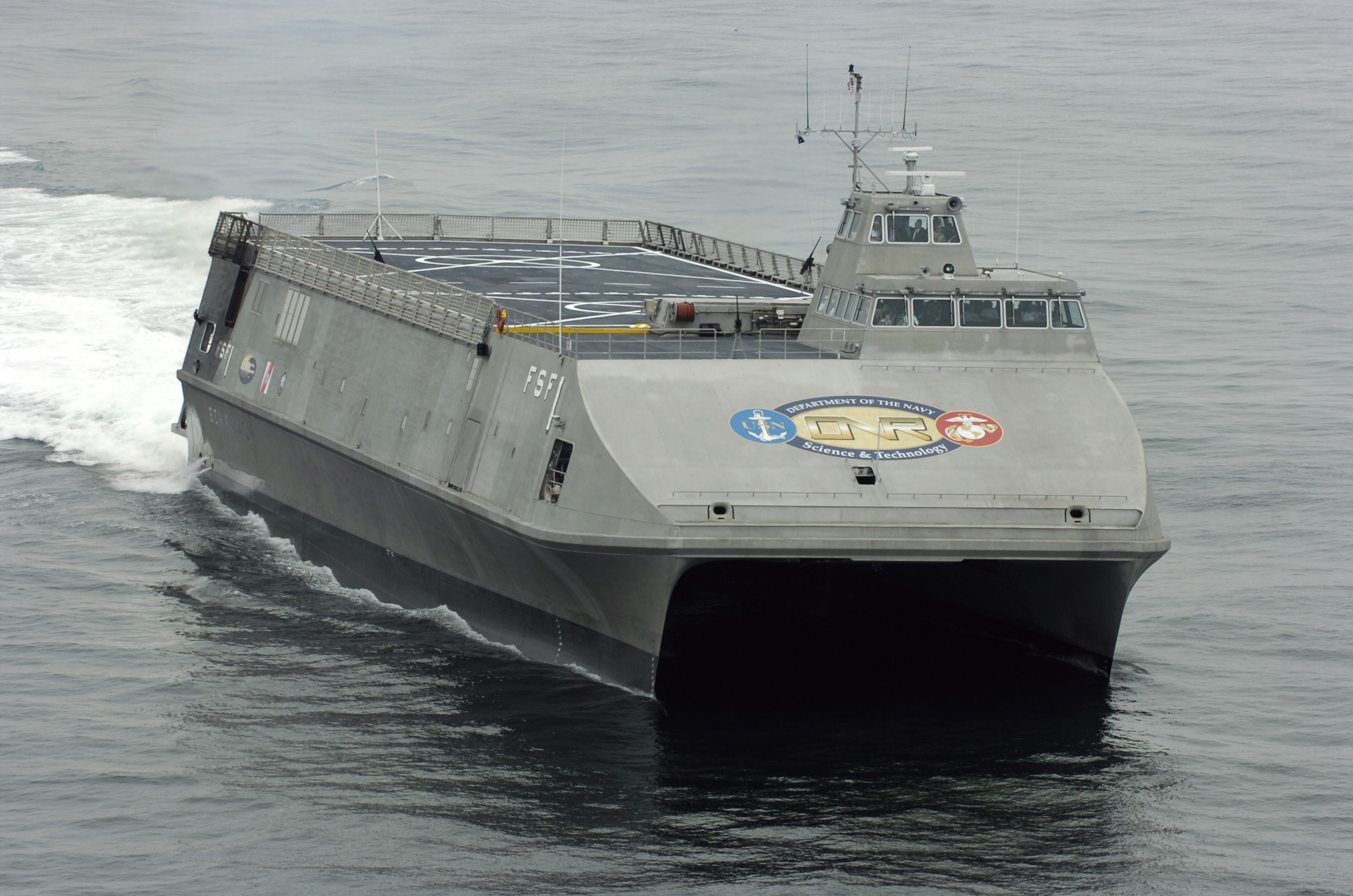
- Sea Fighter

History

United States
- Name: Sea Fighter
- Ordered: 15 February 2003
- Builder: Nichols Bros. Boat Builders, Freeland, Washington
- Cost: between $180 and $220 million
- Laid down: 5 June 2003
- Launched: 10 February 2005
- Christened: 7 February 2005
- In service: 31 May 2005
- Identification: FSF-1
- Status: In service

General characteristics
- Type: Experimental littoral combat ship
- Displacement: 1,600 tons
- Length: 262 ft (79.9 m)
- Beam: 72 ft (21.9 m)
- Draft: 11.5 ft (3.5 m)
- Propulsion: Combined diesel or gas turbine
- Speed: 55 knots (102 km/h)
- Range: 4,400 nautical miles (8,100 km)
- Complement: 4 officers, 22 enlisted (Navy and Coast Guard)
- Aviation facilities: 2 helipads, UAV capable

Sea Fighter (FSF-1) is an experimental littoral combat ship in service with the United States Navy. Its hull is of a small-waterplane-area twin-hull (SWATH) design, which provides exceptional stability, even on rough seas. The ship can operate in both blue and littoral waters. For power, it can use either its dual gas-turbine engines for speed or its dual diesel engines for efficient cruising. It can be easily reconfigured through the use of interchangeable mission modules.

Helicopters can land and launch on its deck. Smaller water craft can be carried and launched from its stern. The vessel is being developed under the program title Littoral Surface Craft-Experimental (LSC(X)) with a hull type designation Fast Sea Frame. The first vessel has been assigned the hull classification symbol FSF 1 and also has been referred to as the X-Craft. The vessel was designed by British company BMT Nigel Gee who continue with a role in the development of the vessel.

== Description ==
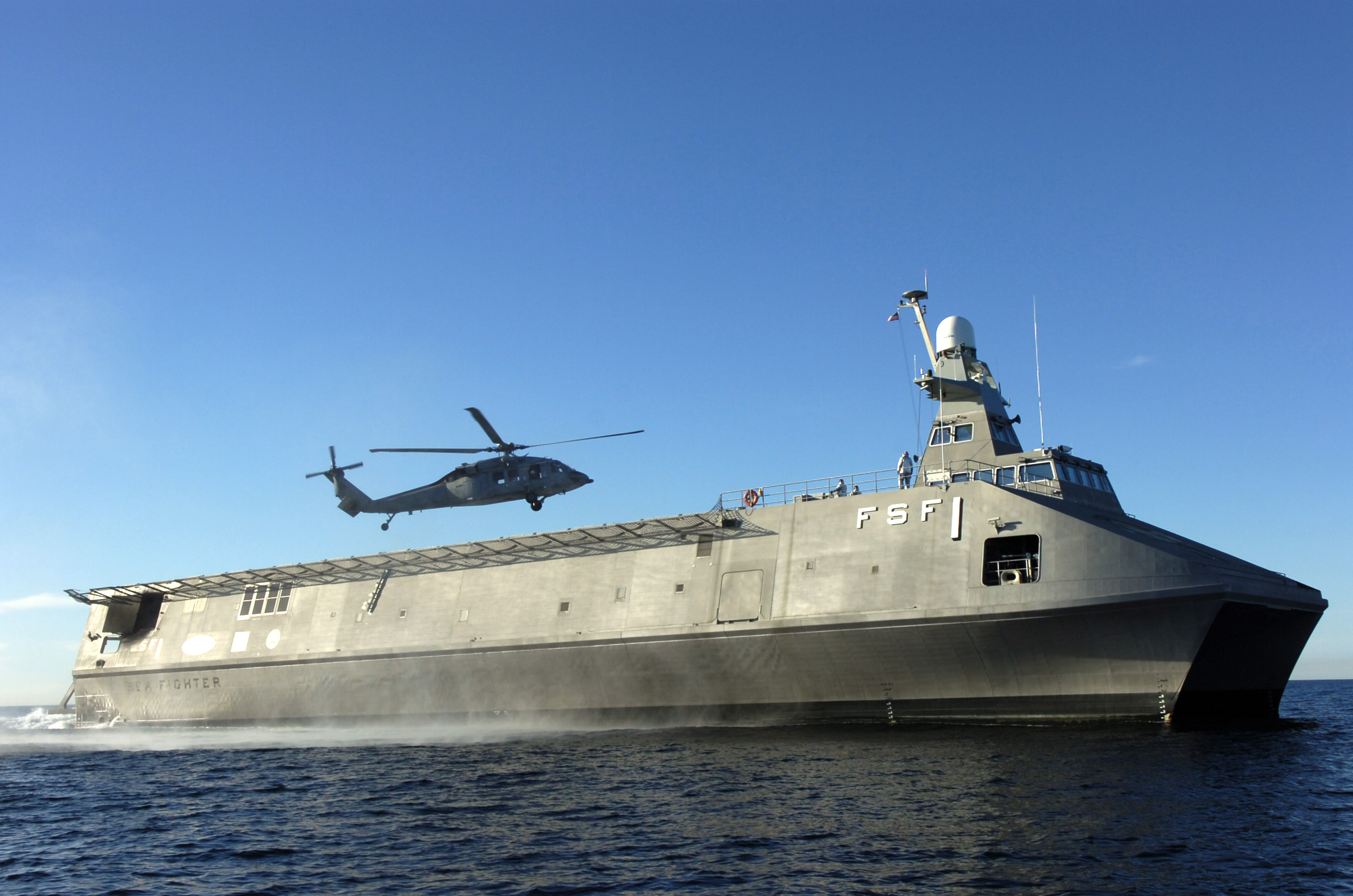
A helicopter lands on Sea Fighter

Sea Fighter's hull is a small-waterplane-area twin hull (SWATH) design, constructed out of aluminium.

With twin gas turbine engines, quad water jets, and streamlined hulls, Sea Fighter is capable of speeds of 50 knots (90 km/h) and greater. It is designed to be a sea frame that can carry interchangeable mission modules resembling shipping containers. These modules allow it to be easily reconfigured to meet a variety of mission requirements, including mine warfare, anti-submarine operations, amphibious assault support, surface warfare, transport and logistical missions, cruise-missile launch, and special-forces interdiction operations. The mission modules are easily loaded and stored on Sea Fighter's inner deck.

The vessel has the capability of launching small craft up to 11 metres (36 ft) in length from the stern, including assault craft and submersibles by means of a custom dual-purpose ramp that also enables RORO operations for HMMWV and other vehicles. The vessel also has a twin-pad helicopter deck capable of operating aircraft up to the size of an H-60 type, including unmanned aerial vehicles, and landing helicopters while travelling at speeds of up to 50 knots (90 km/h). A special deck-lighting system has been developed for Sea Fighter using low-intensity green lighting around the vessel's edges and helipads. This lighting is particularly effective when using night-vision goggles, making landings on the vessel easier than on conventional warships, even at the higher speeds in which Sea Fighter operates.

The basic design has a displacement of 1,100 tons while measuring 79.9 metres (262 ft) long at waterline and 22 metres (72 ft) broad. Power is provided by a CODOG arrangement comprising two MTU 595 diesel engines and two General Electric LM2500 gas turbines. Diesel power is used for cruising while the turbines provide high-power output for high-speed operation. The two gas turbines power the vessel's four water jets, drawing water from the bottom stern of each hull and powering it through large water turbines, which are responsible for the vessel's high operating speed. Each water jet has thrust vectoring and thrust reversers making it possible to move sideways while docking, or even travelling in astern. Thrust vectoring also makes it possible for Sea Fighter to make evasive maneuvers while travelling at high speed. This would prevent the craft from being forced to shore or into the path of enemy vessels.

Sea Fighter's forward superstructure consists of a bridge on the lower deck, and a flight operations station on top. The bridge is relatively small, and generally manned by a crew of three. The bridge control stations incorporate glass displays using the modern navigational aids to assist Sea Fighter in patrolling coastal areas while operating at high speed. Above the bridge is a small flight-operations station with room for only one operator. This glass-enclosed station provides an unobstructed view of the entire flight deck and allows the operator to coordinate the approach and landing of helicopters, and loading of the vessel's mission containers, as well as providing visual aid for navigation.

The ship has a computer system to control its systems and for navigation. Steering and throttle control are done by wire rather than mechanical linkage.

Sea Fighter was constructed at the Nichols Bros. Boat Builders shipyard at Freeland, Washington, under contract to Titan Corporation. Nichols Shipyard was selected because of their previous experience in the construction of aluminium-hulled high-speed ferries.

== Role ==
Sea Fighter is destined for employment by the Office of Naval Research as a testbed for technologies related to the Navy's littoral combat ship effort, as well as direct testing of the hull design. Once trials are completed, the navy will have the option of outfitting the vessel for operational deployment.

== Future development ==
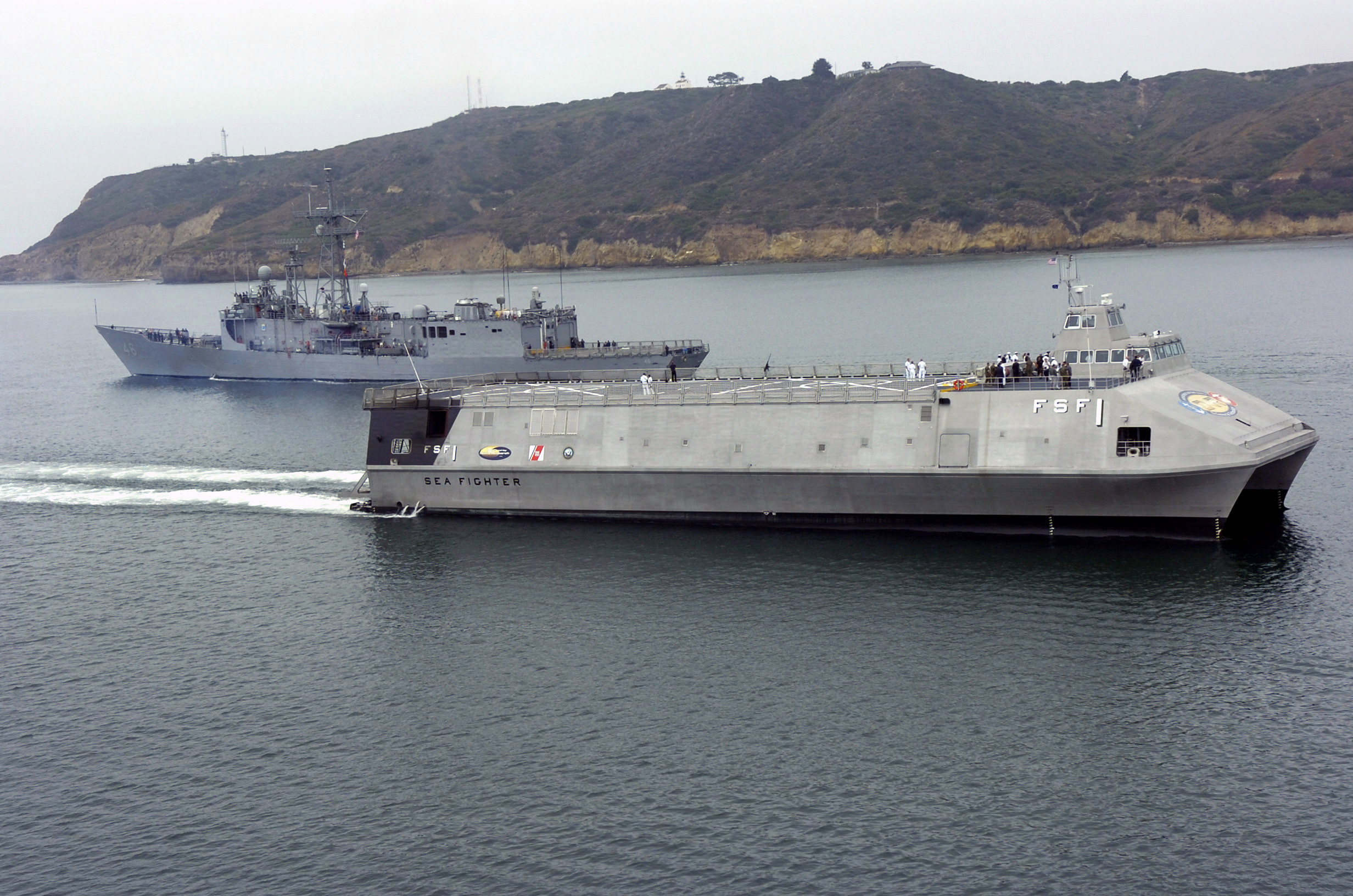
Sea Fighter in San Diego with USS Rentz

The Navy and Coast Guard are jointly exploring the possibility of further development of Sea Fighter–type vessels for use in patrolling U.S. coastal waters. With an effective range of 4,400 nautical miles (8,100 km) unrefueled, the type could also be deployed quickly overseas. Sea Fighter is expected to pave the way for a future line of fast, long-range destroyers capable of travelling fast enough to avoid or outmaneuver most of the current generation of torpedoes. Such vessels would be capable of crossing the Atlantic Ocean unrefueled, and have a very low radar signature, making detection difficult. They would be able to respond quickly to targets located by air or satellite and aggressively attack surface and submerged vessels using their speed to evade torpedo and missile attack.

== Concerns ==
Some concern has been raised with regard to the use of aluminium alloys almost exclusively in the construction of Sea Fighter's hull, as well as future vessels based on the design. While aluminum alloys have a high specific strength, they melt at a lower temperature than steel. Some lay concern has been expressed about aluminum hulls actually burning, but only aluminum dust or powder is considered flammable. Additionally galvanic corrosion may result between the aluminum hull and steel fittings, as happened to the littoral combat ship USS Independence.
