= USS Tulsa (LCS-16) =

Independence-class littoral combat ship of the United States Navy

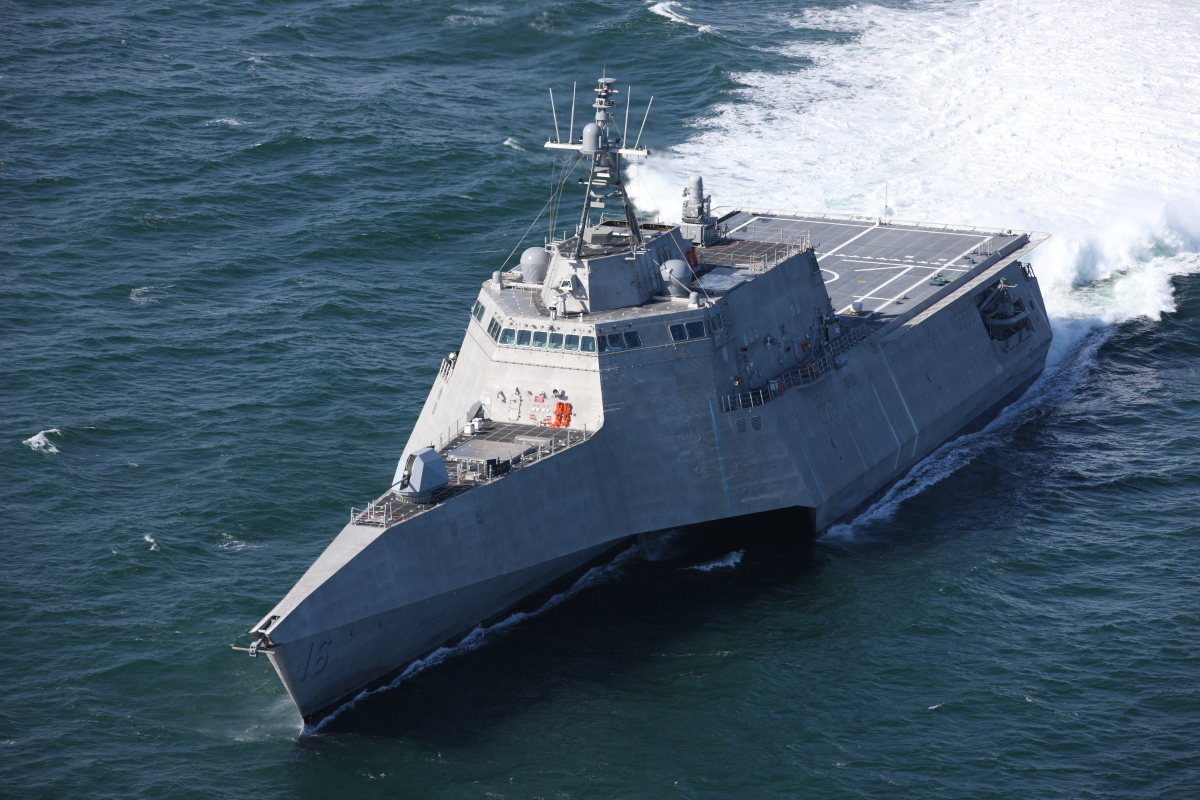
- USS Tulsa on 8 March 2018

History

United States
- Name: Tulsa
- Namesake: Tulsa, Oklahoma
- Awarded: 29 December 2010
- Builder: Austal USA
- Laid down: 11 January 2016
- Launched: 16 March 2017
- Sponsored by: Kathy Taylor
- Christened: 11 February 2017
- Acquired: 30 April 2018
- Commissioned: 16 February 2019
- Home port: Bahrain
- Identification: MMSI number: 368926114; Hull number: LCS-16
- Motto: Tough, Able, Ready
- Status: Active
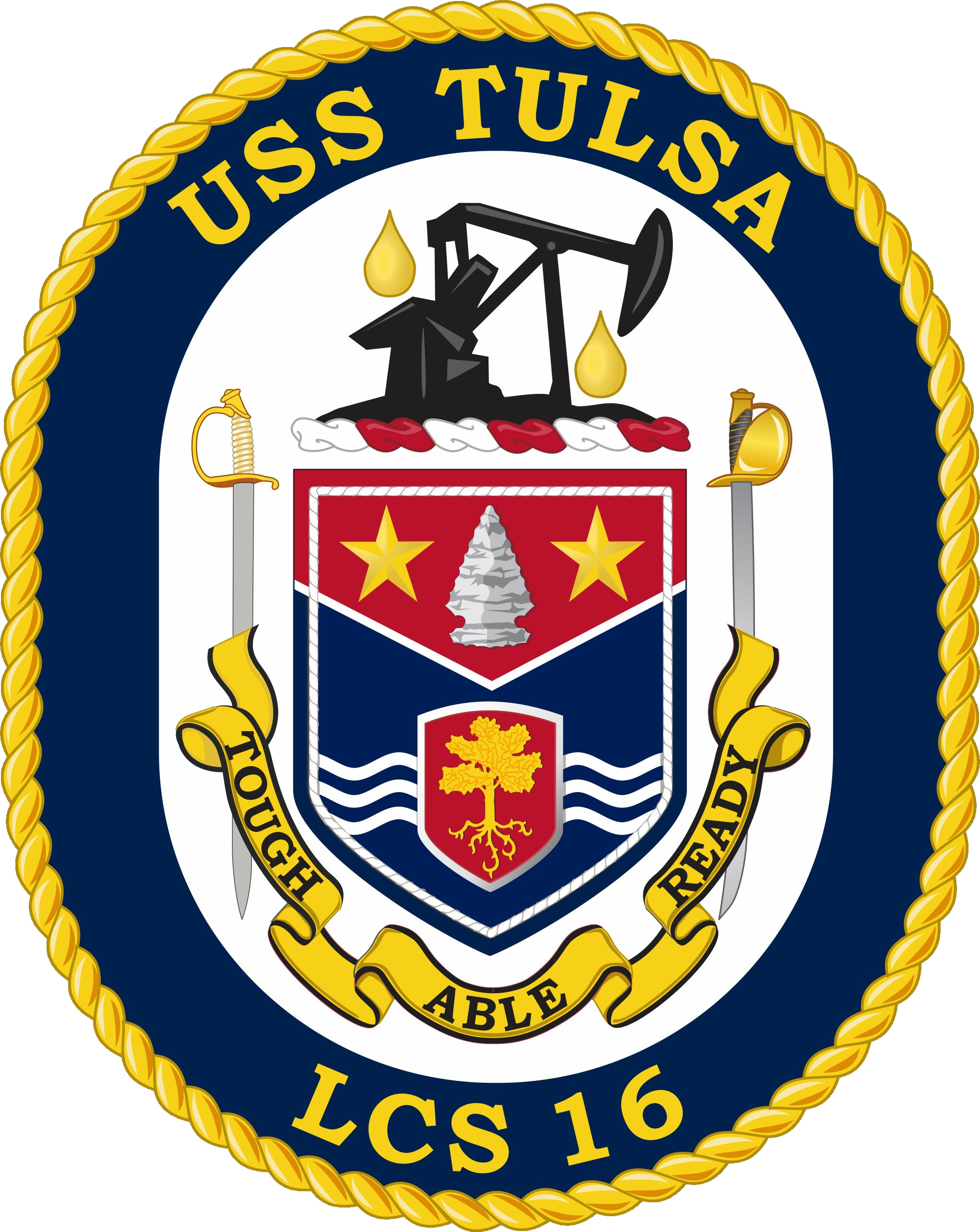
- Badge

General characteristics
- Class & type: Independence-class littoral combat ship
- Displacement: 2,307 metric tons light, 3,104 metric tons full, 797 metric tons deadweight
- Length: 127.4 m (418 ft)
- Beam: 31.6 m (104 ft)
- Draft: 14 ft (4.27 m)
- Propulsion: 2× gas turbines, 2× diesel, 4× waterjets, retractable Azimuth thruster, 4× diesel generators
- Speed: 40 knots (74 km/h; 46 mph)+, 47 knots (54 mph; 87 km/h) sprint
- Range: 4,300 nautical miles (8,000 km; 4,900 mi) at 20 knots (37 km/h; 23 mph)+
- Capacity: 210 tonnes
- Complement: 40 core crew (8 officers, 32 enlisted) plus up to 35 mission crew
- Sensors & processing systems: Sea Giraffe 3D Surface/Air RADAR; Bridgemaster-E Navigational RADAR; AN/KAX-2 EO/IR sensor for GFC
- Electronic warfare & decoys: EDO ES-3601 ESM; 4× SRBOC rapid bloom chaff launchers
- Armament: BAE Systems Mk 110 57 mm gun; 4× .50 cal (12.7 mm) guns (2 aft, 2 forward); Evolved SeaRAM 11 cell missile launcher; Mission modules
- Aircraft carried: 2× MH-60R/S Seahawks

USS Tulsa (LCS-16) is an Independence-class littoral combat ship of the United States Navy. She is the third ship to be named for Tulsa, second-largest city in the U.S. state of Oklahoma.

== Design ==
In 2002, the United States Navy initiated a program to develop the first of a fleet of littoral combat ships. The Navy initially ordered two trimaran hulled ships from General Dynamics, which became known as the Independence-class littoral combat ship after the first ship of the class, USS Independence. Even-numbered U.S. Navy littoral combat ships are built using the Independence-class trimaran design, while odd-numbered ships are based on a competing design, the conventional monohull Freedom-class littoral combat ship. The initial order of littoral combat ships involved a total of four ships, including two of the Independence-class design. On 29 December 2010, the Navy announced that it was awarding Austal USA a contract to build ten additional Independence-class littoral combat ships.

== Construction and career ==
Tulsa was constructed by Austal USA in Mobile, Alabama. A keel laying ceremony, which usually signifies the startìng of ship construction, was held at the Austal shipyards in Mobile on 11 January 2016, but because the ship was assembled from prefabricated modules, Tulsa was already 60 percent complete at the time. Kathy Taylor, former mayor of Tulsa, served as ship's sponsor.

Tulsa was christened on 11 February 2017, launched on 16 March 2017, and commissioned on 16 February 2019. She has been assigned to Littoral Combat Ship Squadron One

Tulsa returned to San Diego on 30 July 2022 following deployment.

On 27 August 2025, Tulsa arrived at the Port of Colombo, Sri Lanka, on a replenishment visit under the command of Commander K. A. Moyer. The vessel departed the island on 29 August. It arrived in the Persian Gulf later in the year carrying a mine countermeasure mission package.
