= AN/WLD-1 Remote Minehunting System =

AN/WLD-1
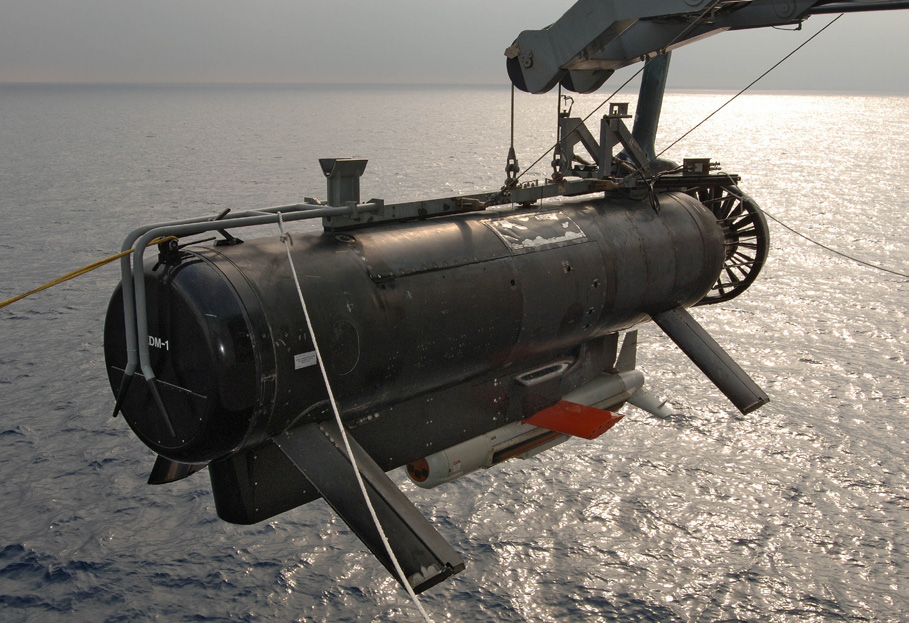
- Remote Multi-Mission Vehicle component of RMS

The AN/WLD-1 Remote Minehunting System (RMS), produced by Lockheed Martin, is a remotely controlled minesweeping system to be operated by surface warships. It consists of an unmanned semisubmersible vehicle, which tows a sonar array, and control infrastructure aboard the parent ship. The unmanned semisubmersible vehicle used is the US Navy Snorkeler-Class Unmanned Surface Vehicle.

In accordance with the Joint Electronics Type Designation System (JETDS), the "AN/WLD-1" designation represents the first design of an Army-Navy electronic device for surface and underwater combined countermeasures surveillance system. The JETDS system also now is used to name all Department of Defense electronic systems.

== History ==
In 2013, the system completed developmental testing, and was found to meet "reliability, suitability and effectiveness requirements".

The system has been installed on the Littoral Combat Ship and the Arleigh Burke-class destroyers USS Pinckney, USS Momsen, and USS Bainbridge.

== See also ==
- List of military electronics of the United States
