= Littoral combat ship =

Ship designed for operations near shore

Ships of the United States Navy

Ships in current service
- Current ships

Ships grouped alphabetically
- A–B; C; D–F; G–H; I–K; L; M; N–O; P; Q–R; S; T–V; W–Z

Ships grouped by type
- Aircraft carriers; Airships; Amphibious warfare ships; Auxiliaries; Battlecruisers; Battleships; Cruisers; Destroyers; Destroyer escorts; Destroyer leaders; Escort carriers; Frigates; Hospital ships; Littoral combat ships; Mine warfare vessels; Monitors; Oilers; Patrol vessels; Registered civilian vessels; Sailing frigates; Steam frigates; Steam gunboats; Ships of the line; Sloops of war; Submarines; Torpedo boats; Torpedo retrievers; Unclassified miscellaneous; Yard and district craft

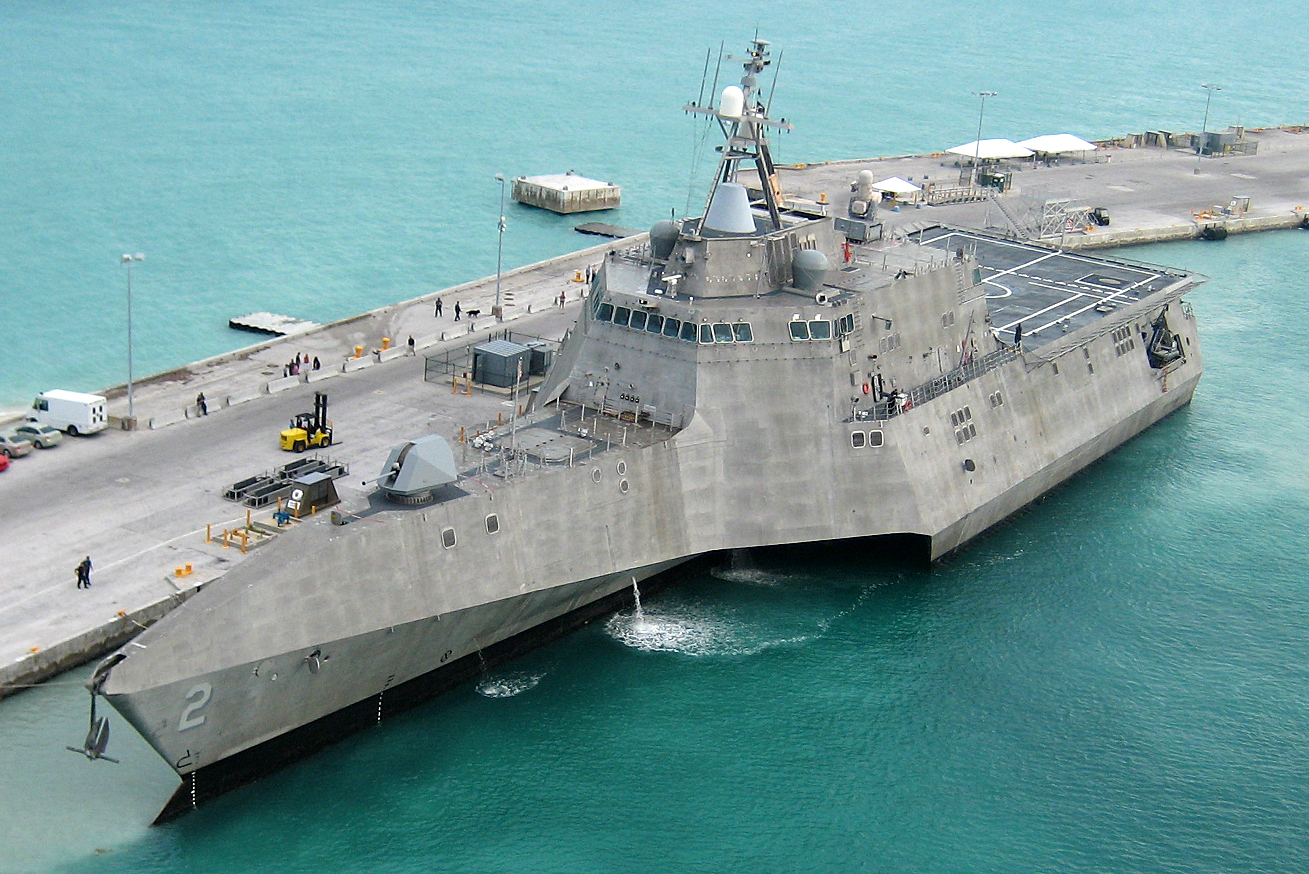
The U.S. trimaran USS Independence

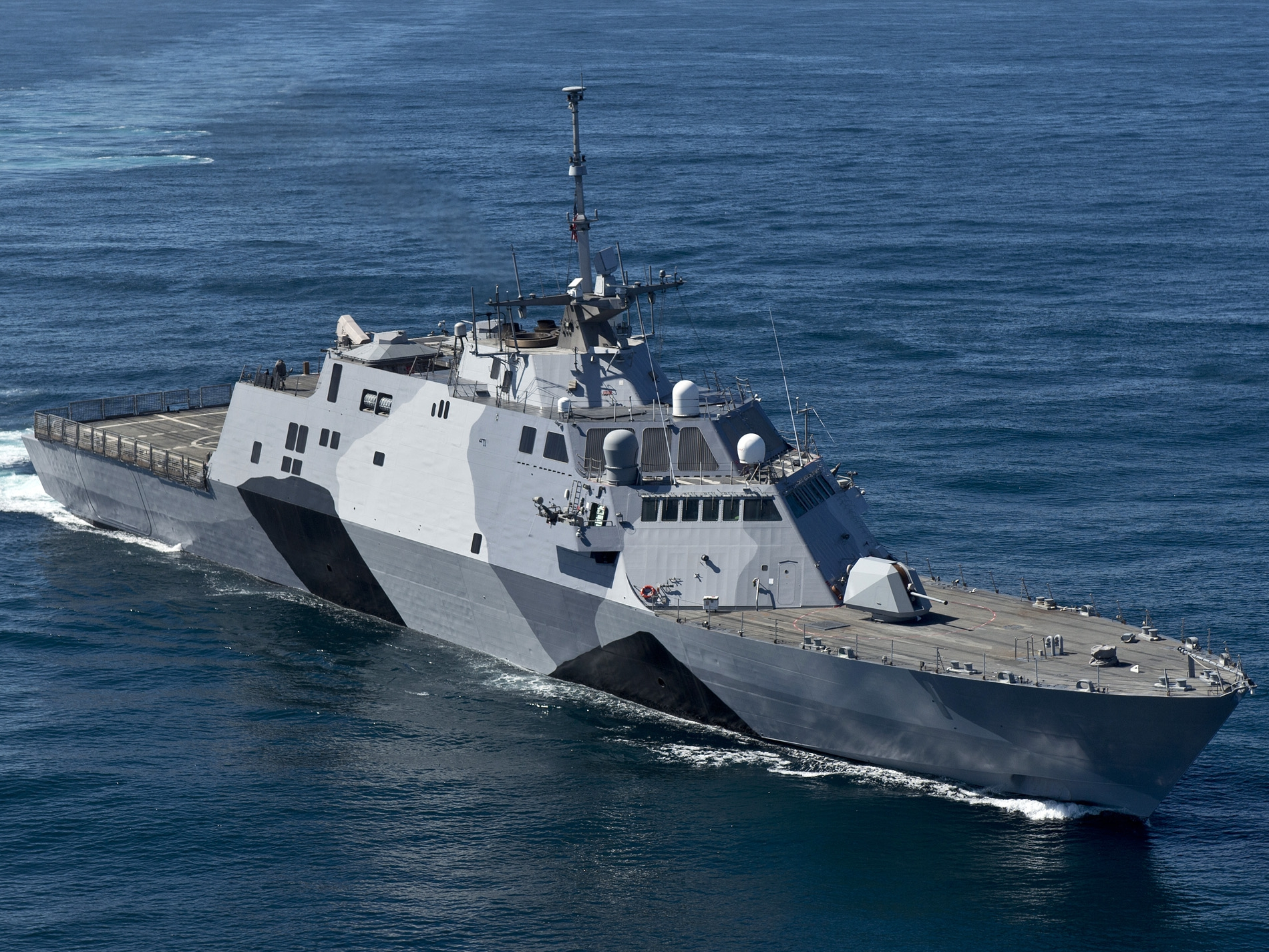
USS Freedom on sea trials in February 2013 before her first deployment

A littoral combat ship (LCS) is a relatively small surface vessel designed for littoral warfare in near-shore operations. There are two LCS ship classes deployed by the United States Navy. The LCS was "envisioned to be a networked, agile, stealthy surface combatant capable of defeating anti-access and asymmetric threats in the littorals", although their ability to perform these missions in practice has been called into question.

Littoral combat ships are comparable to corvettes found in other navies. The Freedom class and the Independence class are the two LCS variants. Each is slightly smaller than the U.S. Navy's earlier Oliver Hazard Perry-class frigate but larger than Cyclone-class patrol ships. Each has the capabilities of a small assault transport, including a flight deck and hangar for housing two SH-60 or MH-60 Seahawk helicopters, a stern ramp for operating small boats, and the cargo volume and payload to deliver a small assault force with fighting vehicles to a roll-on/roll-off port facility. Standard armaments include Mk 110 57 mm guns and RIM-116 Rolling Airframe Missiles. They are also equipped with autonomous air, surface, and underwater vehicles. Possessing lower air defense and surface warfare capabilities than destroyers, the LCS emphasizes speed, flexible mission modules, and a shallow draft.

The first LCS, USS Freedom (LCS-1), was commissioned on 8 November 2008 in Veteran's Park, Milwaukee, Wisconsin. The second ship, the trimaran USS Independence (LCS-2), was commissioned on 16 January 2010, in Mobile, Alabama. In 2012, ADM Jonathan W. Greenert stated that the LCS would be deployed to Africa in place of destroyers and cruisers. In 2013 and 2014, the Navy's requirement for LCSs was progressively cut from 55 to 32 vessels in favor of a newly proposed frigate more capable of high-intensity combat. In late 2014, the Navy proceeded with a procurement plan for enhanced versions of the LCS and upgraded older ships to meet the program's 52-ship requirement; the modified LCS would be redesignated as FF, or frigate. In December 2015, Secretary of Defense Ashton Carter ordered the Navy to reduce planned LCS and FF procurement from 52 to 40 and downselect to one variant by Fiscal Year (FY) 2019.

In July 2017, the Navy released a request for information for a new multi-mission guided-missile frigate that can perform the same roles as the LCS while having better offensive and defensive capabilities. Almost any existing design that can be adapted to FFG(X) requirements can be considered, extending beyond versions of the two LCS hulls. In April 2020, it was announced that Fincantieri Marinette Marine had won the contract with its FREMM multi-purpose frigate-based design, which would be eventually adopted as the Constellation-class frigate.

== Design features ==
The concept behind the littoral combat ship, as described by former Secretary of the Navy Gordon R. England, is to "create a small, fast, maneuverable and relatively inexpensive member of the DD(X) family of ships". The ship is easy to reconfigure for different roles, including anti-submarine warfare, mine countermeasures, anti-surface warfare, intelligence, surveillance and reconnaissance, homeland defense, maritime intercept, special operations, and logistics. The LCS's modular design enables it to replace slower, more specialized ships such as minesweepers and larger amphibious-type assault ships.

Most of the mission modules' functions are performed by carried vehicles such as helicopters or unmanned vehicles such as the Spartan Scout, AN/WLD-1 RMS Remote Minehunting System and MQ-8B Fire Scout as part of the Navy's goal to "unman the front lines". Performing functions such as sonar sweeps for mines or submarines as well as launching torpedoes against hostile submarines at a distance from the ship is less risky. Placing sensors on remote vehicles allows the LCS to exploit concepts such as bistatic sonar. DARPA's Tactically Exploited Reconnaissance Node (TERN) program aims to build a medium-altitude long-endurance unmanned aerial vehicle (MALE UAV) that can operate from LCS-2 and can carry a payload of 600 pounds (270 kg) out to an operational radius of 600–900 nautical miles (1,100–1,700 km).

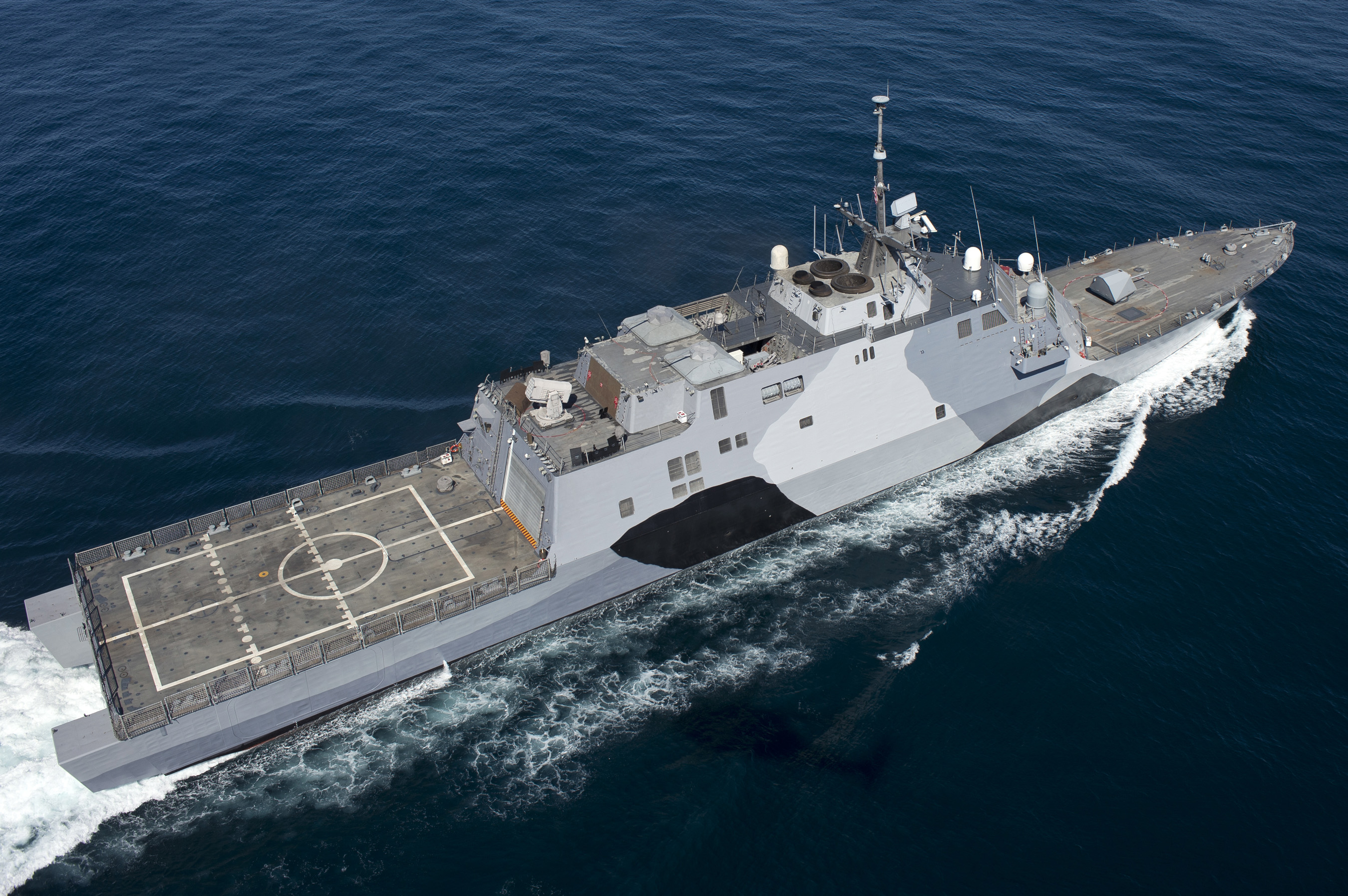
Aerial view of USS Freedom

A 2010 report by the Pentagon's director of operational test and evaluation (DOT&E) found that neither design was expected to "be survivable in a hostile combat environment" and that neither ship could withstand the Navy's full ship shock trials. The Navy responded that the LCS is built to a Level 1+ survivability standard and that the ships will rely on warnings from networks and speed to avoid being hit, or if hit be able to limp to safety. ADM Jonathan Greenert said that the crew would "conduct an orderly abandon ship" if their ship was struck by enemy fire, an action that might not be necessary on other vessels in the same circumstances. The ships were designed to minimize vulnerability with modern automated damage control systems to perform its mission, then withdraw from the area under its own power.

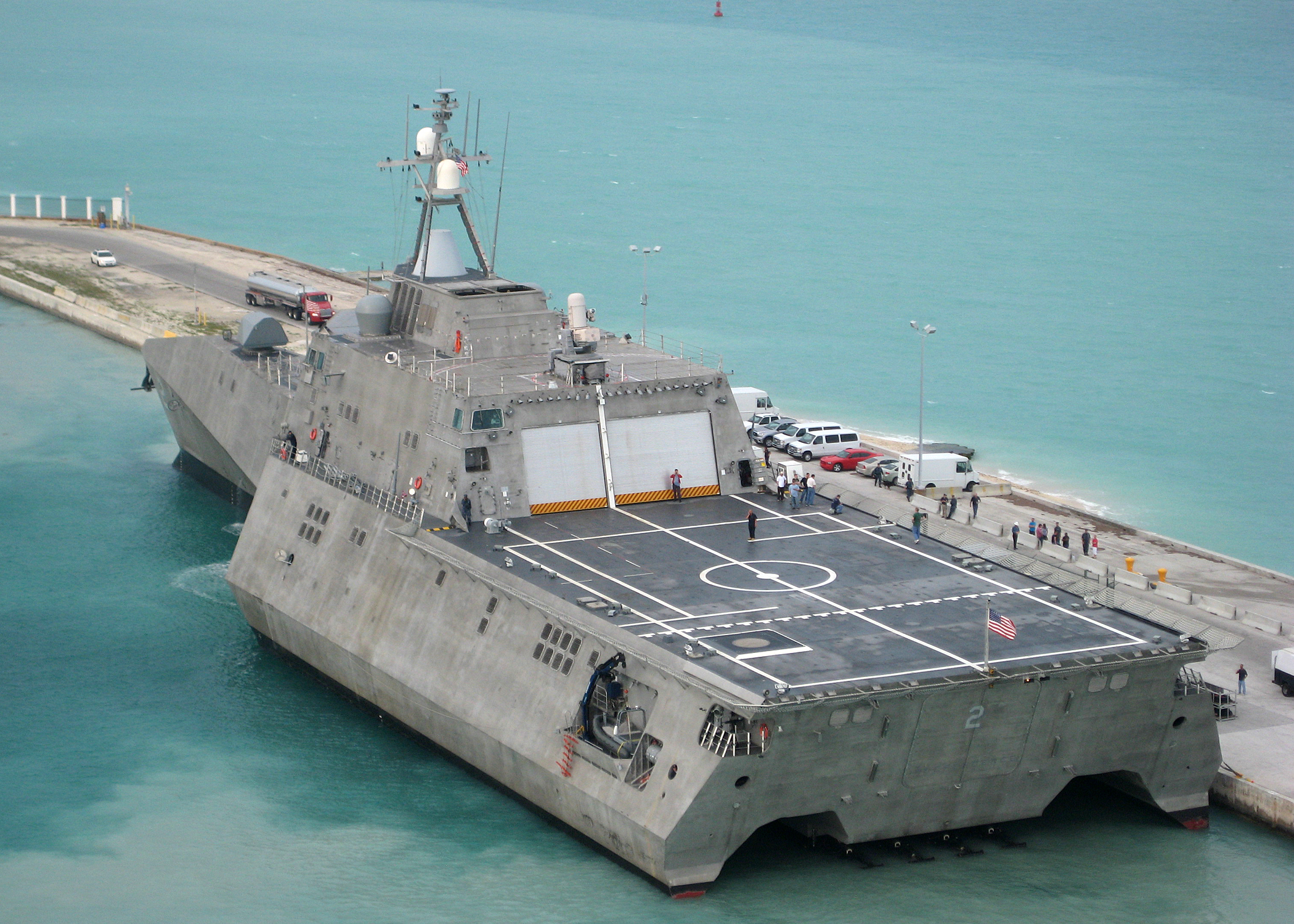
Port-aft view of an Independence-class LCS

The combat abilities of the LCS were said to be "very modest" even before the cancellation of the XM501 Non-Line-of-Sight Launch System. The Independence variant reportedly has better helicopter facilities and more internal space while the Freedom variant is said to be better able to launch and recover boats in high seas. Admiral Gary Roughead said that a mix of both types would be "operationally advantageous".

In April 2012, Chief of Naval Operations Greenert said, "You won't send it into an anti-access area"; rather, groups of two or three ships are intended to be sent into areas where access is jeopardized to perform missions like minesweeping while under the cover of a destroyer. The LCS's main purpose is to take up operations such as patrolling, port visits, anti-piracy, and partnership-building exercises to free up high-end surface combatants for increased combat availability. Navy Secretary Ray Mabus clarified that the ship could operate in combat areas while under the protection of other warships. The LCS's utility against high-tech enemies would be when working with and being covered by destroyers, like they do with aircraft carriers. With destroyers providing extended air and missile defense, the cheaper (one-fourth the cost of a destroyer) and more numerous LCS can sweep for mines and deploy more sophisticated submarine-detecting sonar. Following the decision to arm the LCS with anti-ship missiles, Navy wargames showed the adversary's risk calculus was radically changed, devoting more reconnaissance assets to trying to locate the smaller ships and sustaining heavier losses.

The ships are planned to have a 3:2:1 manning concept. That is three ship crews, and two hulls for each ship that is on station at any time. The other ship and other two crews who are not on deployment will either be preparing for deployment or in rotation in or out of theater. The result is a 50% reduction in ships and a 25% reduction in crews (and smaller crew sizes) than traditional deployment practices. The ships were predicted to fall short in manning. The Navy has deployed ships with berthing modules in the mission bays in order to carry the crew required for operations. However, the ships are designed with sufficient headroom to change from 2-high bunking to 3-high bunking, which would allow crew sizes of 100 if needed.

The LCS is the first USN surface combatant class in a generation to not use the Aegis Combat System, though Aegis-equipped variants have been offered to foreign customers. They have suffered from problems in their communications and radars and will require refits in these areas. Neither LCS class is able to defend itself effectively against anti-ship cruise missiles, which are commonly employed in the littorals, although they can disperse in shallow waters better than larger warships.

=== Mission modules ===
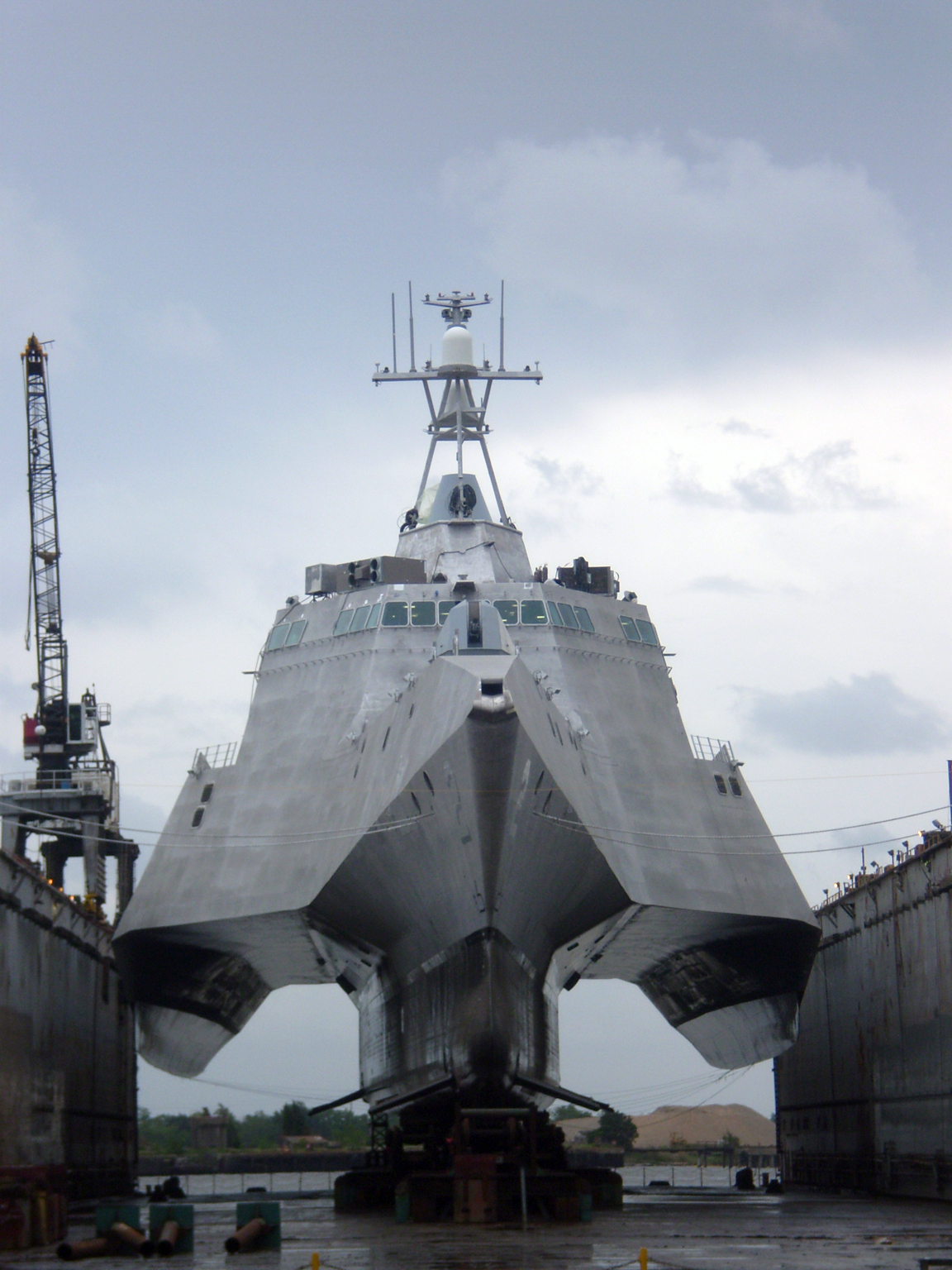
Trimaran hull of an Independence-class LCS

The LCS is reconfigured for various roles by changing mission packages, each of which includes mission module equipment (weapon systems, sensors, etc.), carried craft and mission crews. Modules include anti-submarine warfare (ASW), mine countermeasures (MCM), surface warfare (SUW), and special warfare missions. The MCM and SUW modules are planned to reach initial operating capability in Fiscal Year (FY) 2014, and the ASW module in FY 2016. Module changes were envisioned to allow a single LCS to change roles in a matter of hours at any commercial port, allowing it to rapidly optimize effectiveness against a threat. A report from the Office of the Chief of Naval Operations (OPNAV) on a January 2012 sustainment wargame reportedly stated that, possibly for logistics reasons, the mission module changes may take as long as weeks, and that in the future, the Navy plans to use LCSs with a single module, with module changes being a rare occurrence. In 2014, Independence switched from mine to surface warfare modes in 96 hours on short notice.

In an announcement on 8 September 2016, the Navy revealed a radical change in operations and organization plans for the LCS. Of the 28 Flight 0 ships built or on order, the first four, two of each class, will be turned into training ships, and the remaining 24 will be divided into six divisions of four ships each: three divisions of the Freedom class based at Naval Station Mayport, Florida, and three divisions of the Independence class based at Naval Station San Diego, California. The new organization does away with the LCS's signature interchangeable mission module concept, with each division being tasked to fulfill one of the three mission sets. Crewing is also changed into a more simplified two-crew "blue/gold" model, like that used on submarines and minesweepers, where ships cycle to forward deployed locations with the two crews swapping roles every 4–5 months; aviation detachments will also deploy with the same LCS crew, creating an arrangement of a core 70-sailor crew to conduct the warfare mission and a 23-person air detachment.

==== Surface warfare ====
In addition to the ships' organic weapons systems, the surface warfare package includes two 30 mm gun systems, a counter-boat missile system, two 11-meter (36 ft) rigid-hull inflatable boats (RHIBs), and weapons deployed from MH-60 helicopters and MQ-8 Fire Scout UAVs. The surface warfare mission module is intended to deal with small boats and is called the "best swarm killer in the surface fleet". It includes two 30 mm gun mission modules manufactured by Teledyne Brown Engineering, Inc. The Navy's proposed budget for FY 2015 includes funding for the Surface-to-Surface Missile Module (SSMM) for the first time.

In January 2011, the U.S. Navy recommended the selection of Raytheon's Griffin missile to replace the NLOS-LS missile, lowering the LCS's missile range from 25 miles (40 km) to 3.5 miles (5.6 km). The packages were to be deployed in sets of three, with 15 per set for a total of 45 missiles. Initial deployment of the Griffin was set for 2015, with a longer-ranged version to enter service around 2017; however, procurement was canceled after the missiles were judged as "too lightweight". An enhanced Griffin and the Sea Spear were considered likely competitors for the increment 2 missile. The Navy chose to integrate the millimeter wave radar-guided AGM-114L Hellfire missile to increase the LCS's standoff firepower and defense against swarming fast attack craft. Navy use of the Hellfire gives access to the U.S. Army's existing stockpile of 10,000 missiles. The Hellfire is an interim decision; the Navy is interested in developing a longer-range version. An LCS can carry 24 Hellfire missiles in its SSMM, using M299 vertical launchers mounted within a gas containment system; the SSMM design does not facilitate at-sea reloading. The Hellfire was slated to be operational aboard the LCS by 2017. A longer-range missile with an over-the-horizon (OTH) engagement capability was planned to defend against fast attack craft, ships, and patrol boats by 2020 as part of the surface warfare package Increment 4.

Norwegian company Kongsberg Defense & Aerospace proposed equipping LCSs with their radar-evading Naval Strike Missile, presenting scale models of the Freedom class with 12 NSMs and the Independence class with 18 NSMs. In July 2014, the Navy confirmed that it would test-launch the NSM from Coronado to evaluate feasibility, the first time an LCS fired a surface-to-surface missile. The NSM has a range of 100 nmi (120 mi; 190 km), greater than the Harpoon anti-ship missile, but LCSs lack long-range fire control systems to detect targets at this distance. On 24 September 2014, the NSM was successfully fired at a mobile target. The LCS's modular design makes it possible to add weapons and sensors as part of the warfare suite. This could mitigate lethality criticism of the LCS, which is oriented toward asymmetric swarm boat threats rather than comparable surface combatants.

In September 2015, the Navy issued a directive to install an OTH missile on Freedom and Coronado for their next deployments in early and mid-2016. The exact missile was not specified, but sources say it will be both the Harpoon and NSM, each ship equipped with only one model of missile. The directive calls for up to eight missiles, likely in two quad packs, to be installed on box launchers as a standalone system without requiring full integration into the LCS combat system. On 19 July 2016, Coronado conducted a live-fire missile test of a Block 1C Harpoon missile; although the missile missed the target, the test validated the ability to launch Harpoon missiles from the forward deck of an LCS. In May 2018, the Navy selected the NSM as the LCS's OTH missile.

In January 2020, the Navy reported that Lockheed Martin's 150 kW High Energy Laser with Integrated Optical-dazzler and Surveillance (HELIOS) would be put on USS Little Rock (LCS-9) for her upcoming deployment. The laser is part of a risk reduction effort to contribute to a layered laser defense effort and the LCS's lethality to counter fast-attack craft and UAS.

==== Anti-submarine module ====
The anti-submarine module had its focus changed from stationary to en-stride systems (while the ship is moving) that are useful in the open ocean as well as in coastal areas. One of the items to be added is a torpedo detection capability. Thales has sold one CAPTAS-4 low-frequency active sonar to the U.S. Navy to be towed behind the LCS, with a potential order of 25 units. The USN tested combination of this unit, derived from the Sonar 2087 on British Type 23 frigates, with the TB-37 Multi-Function Towed Array (MFTA) found on U.S. warships. As of September 2013, deployment of the ASW module was planned for 2016, with the 2013 sequestration cuts potentially pushing it back to 2017.

Submarine detection will be achieved on the LCS using a variable depth sonar (VDS) and the TB-37 MFTA. Both can passively listen or actively emit to analyze the returns. The VDS was originally planned to be the Raytheon AN/SQS-62, but the Navy canceled it in 2022, citing high risk, instead choosing the Thales CAPTAS-4 in 2023. The VDS will allow the LCS to detect diesel-electric submarines while on the move. Submarines can hide behind water layers based on how sound is refracted through the temperature, salinity, and pressure profile; a VDS can pierce layers better than hull-mounted sonars found on destroyers and cruisers. LCSs will also be fitted with a torpedo decoy system under development. To destroy submarines, an MH-60S helicopter will deploy the Mark 54 Lightweight Torpedo.

A wargame held by the Naval War College demonstrated the possibility of using the LCS in open water operations to assist carrier strike groups and guided-missile destroyers. The LCS was found to be more useful in open water operations than previously considered. The wargame found that an LCS operating the ASW package could perform the mission, which freed up a destroyer that would normally perform the mission to contribute to the lethality of the strike group. Submarine hunting ability is increased by the combination of a destroyer's towed array and hull-mounted sonar and an LCS's VDS.

In July 2015, the Navy awarded three contracts to reduce the weight of the package elements down to or below 105 metric tons total to meet mission package weight requirements. Since both elements are mature and fielded (the VDS on Royal Navy Type 23 frigates and MFTA on Arleigh Burke and Zumwalt-class destroyers), the systems cannot be overhauled, and other weight reduction ideas need to be implemented, such as lightening sensors and using composites in the handling system. Plans for the package shifted dramatically in 2011 when it was decided not to use the RMMV, used in the MCM package, in favor of an "in stride" capability. The ASW elements were chosen as cost-effective COTS sensors, so weight reduction needs by between 15 and 25 percent have been planned for since their selection for integration onto the LCS.

==== Mine countermeasure module ====
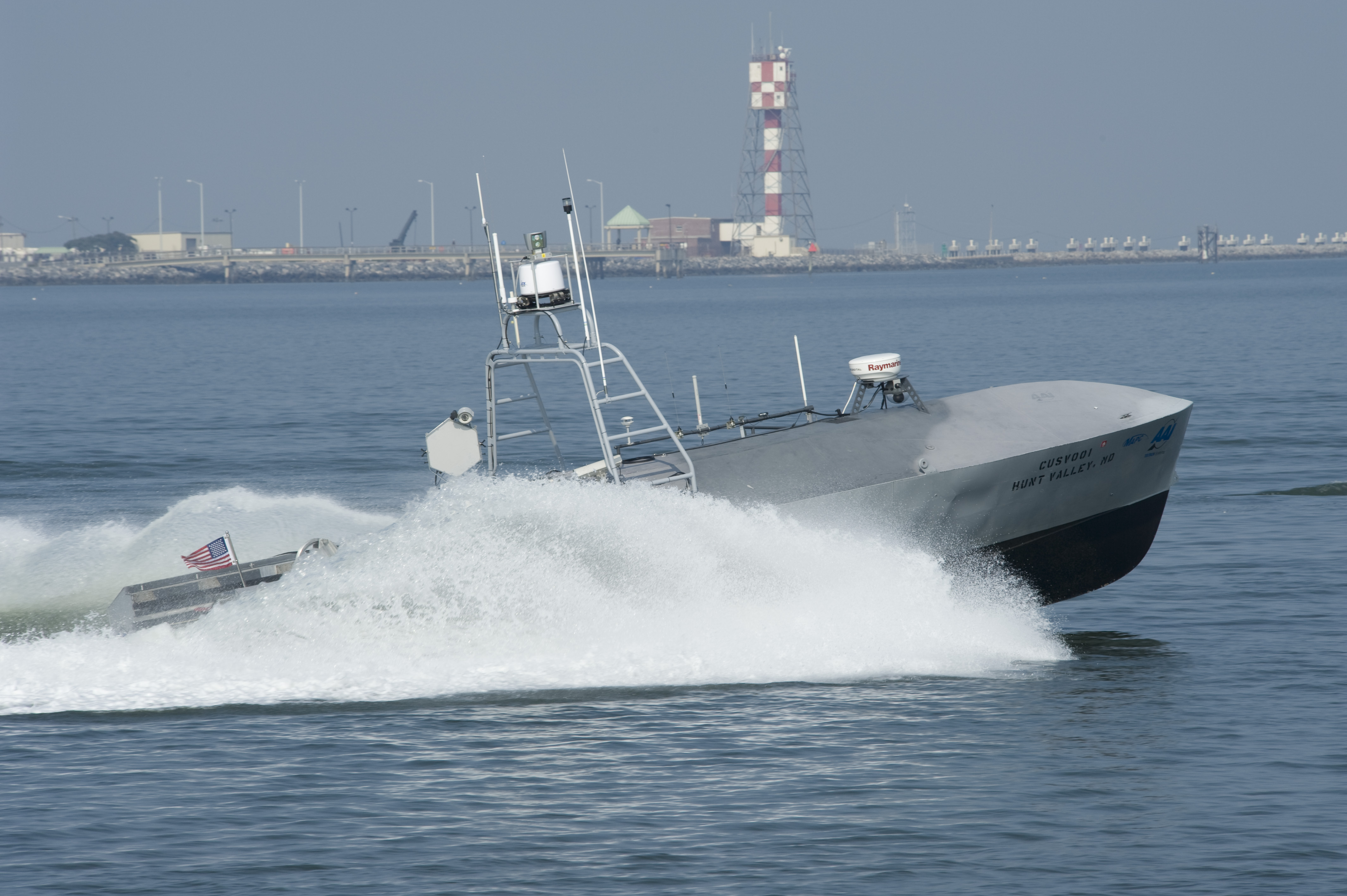
A Fleet-class unmanned surface vessel during testing. The USV will be used for both MCM and ASW.

The mine countermeasure module (MCM) is designed to provide minesweeping; remotely detecting and bypassing mines; and minehunting, detecting, and disabling. It was envisioned to perform "influence" minehunting via acoustic and magnetic signatures rather than contact or mechanical minehunting. The MCM includes the airborne laser mine detection system, the airborne mine neutralization system, the AN/AQS-20A underwater towed sonar, the remote minehunting system, the Coastal Battlefield Reconnaissance and Analysis system, and the Knifefish, a surface mine countermeasure unmanned undersea vehicle. Canceled module features include the Organic Airborne and Surface Influence Sweep System and the Rapid Airborne Mine Clearance System. The final increment IV MCM will not have an EOD team or an in-stride capability to neutralize discovered mines; neutralization is preceded by post-detection mission analysis.

The first increment of the MCM included three systems: the helicopter-deployed airborne laser mine detection system (ALMDS), the airborne mine neutralization system (AMNS), and the remote minehunting system (RMS) composed of the remote multi-mission vehicle (RMMV) paired with the AQS-20A sonar. The ALMDS detects mines near the top of the water, and the RMS will detect them below the waterline. To destroy mines, the AMNS is lowered by the helicopter and guided by an operator on board to neutralize it. Increment two will be the coastal battlefield reconnaissance and analysis system (COBRA) mounted on the MQ-8B to search beaches and surf zones.

Increment three will involve adding the Fleet-class unmanned surface vessel (USV) with the unmanned surface sweep system (USSS), a cable towed behind the boat. Each LCS will carry two, and they will be used for both MCM and ASW. It will mimic the acoustic and magnetic signature of a ship to fool magnetic and influence mines into detonating; introduction is expected in 2017. The final increment will be the Knifefish unmanned underwater vehicle (UUV) to find and detect buried mines in 2019.

In February 2016, the Navy announced that it was halting procurement of the RMMV for reliability issues, the existing ten RMMVs to be upgraded to increase reliability. The upgraded RMMVs will be fielded in 2018, and testing will be conducted to see if the Fleet-class common unmanned surface vessel (CUSV) can tow the AQS-20A, and if successful will be used for minehunting by 2020. If the Knifefish UUV can have its endurance increased, the vessel will take over the mission from both systems.

==== Irregular warfare and amphibious modules ====
The Navy included an irregular warfare package in its 2012 budget request to Congress.

Californian congressman Duncan D. Hunter wrote that the purchase of 55 LCS units was made at the cost of 10 fewer amphibious vessels. Assistant Commandant of the Marine Corps General Joseph Dunford said in 2011 that the LCS is one of the platforms under consideration to help close the gap in amphibious shipping. In August 2014, USS Coronado demonstrated the ability to rapidly stage and deploy Marine Corps ground units, including operations by two Marine Light Attack Helicopter Squadrons (HMLA) that conducted day and night deck-landing qualifications. The Independence-class LCS's features of high speed, a large flight deck to support UH-1Y Venom and AH-1W Super Cobra helicopters, and reconfigurable mission bay can support air and small-boat employment and delivery of ground and air forces; a small Marine ground unit can be carried within an embarked mission module. In 2014, Marine Corps General John M. Paxton, Jr. claimed several deficiencies in using an LCS for amphibious operations as a substitute platform for an amphibious assault ship, including the ability to operate in difficult sea states, survivability in contested waters, limited flight deck and berthing space, and command and control limitations.

In 2014, the U.S. Coast Guard began advocating the LCS as a tailor-made platform for drug interdiction missions. Under pressure from Navy vessels retiring, the Coast Guard will suffer a surface vessel shortage for intercepting smuggling ships in the Caribbean area, forcing the Navy to examine other platforms for drug interdiction. The Coast Guard noted that the LCS has previously performed this task, and pointed towards its high speed and embarked helicopters to run down fast smuggling boats; the Navy plans to base 10 Freedom-class ships at Naval Station Mayport, Florida which could be tasked to conduct interdiction missions.

== Development ==
In the late 1990s, the U.S. Navy realized its Cold War-era cruisers and destroyers had been designed for open-ocean warfare and would be vulnerable in shallow coastal waters, where they would face dangers from high-speed boats, missile-firing fast-attack craft, small submarines, sea mines, and land and air-launched anti-ship missiles. The Navy's official solution was the DD-21, a large coastal warship that could absorb hits. Two Navy strategists, retired Captain Wayne Hughes and Vice Admiral Art Cebrowski, refined an opposing Streetfighter concept for a 1,000-ton small, specialized, and heavily armed vessel costing just $90 million (2001 dollars). Being small, light and numerous, the Streetfighter was envisioned as a "single-serving" ship to be abandoned once it suffered battle damage deemed "fatal" to the ship, made possible by its low cost. The concept of a manned expendable warship was contentious and the idea was not picked up. When Donald Rumsfeld was made Secretary of Defense in early 2001, he promised transformational approaches and doing jobs with fewer people. In October 2001, Cebrowski was assigned to head the Pentagon's new Office of Force Transformation, shortly after which Admiral Vernon Clark canceled the DD-21 and replaced it with a "family" of ships, including the littoral combat ship, being motivated to produce ships cheaper and faster to increase fleet size. Clark declared the LCS was his "most transformational effort" and number-one budget priority in 2003.

The Navy committed to the $15 billion (2003) program in advance of rigorous analysis or clearly defined purpose, appearance, or survivability. Proponents typically pointed to its speed, asymmetric littoral threats, and impact on the U.S. shipbuilding industry. The LCS suffered from requirements creep, adding more missions and equipment, potentially rendering it too complex and expensive to use. When it was decided the ship would not be expendable, the original concept of a small, cheap, simple coastal warship became bigger, more expensive, and more complicated, with a smaller crew due to automation. The new design was assigned six different missions which had been previously performed by individual ships: submarine and mine hunting; combating small boats; intelligence gathering; transporting special forces; and counter-drug and piracy patrols. Each ship would be big enough to sail across the Pacific alone, embark a helicopter, have a minimum 40 knot top speed, and cost $220 million. The Navy was only willing to build one type of ship; the ship's task force, realizing that it would be virtually impossible for one vessel to fill all roles, advocated for a larger hull to cover the mission range through modularity, organic combat power, and unmanned systems. Empty space was left for weapon and sensor mission modules. When the first production contracts were awarded in 2004, no mission module worked outside of a laboratory. Fast, cheap construction was emphasized, solving problems with technology.

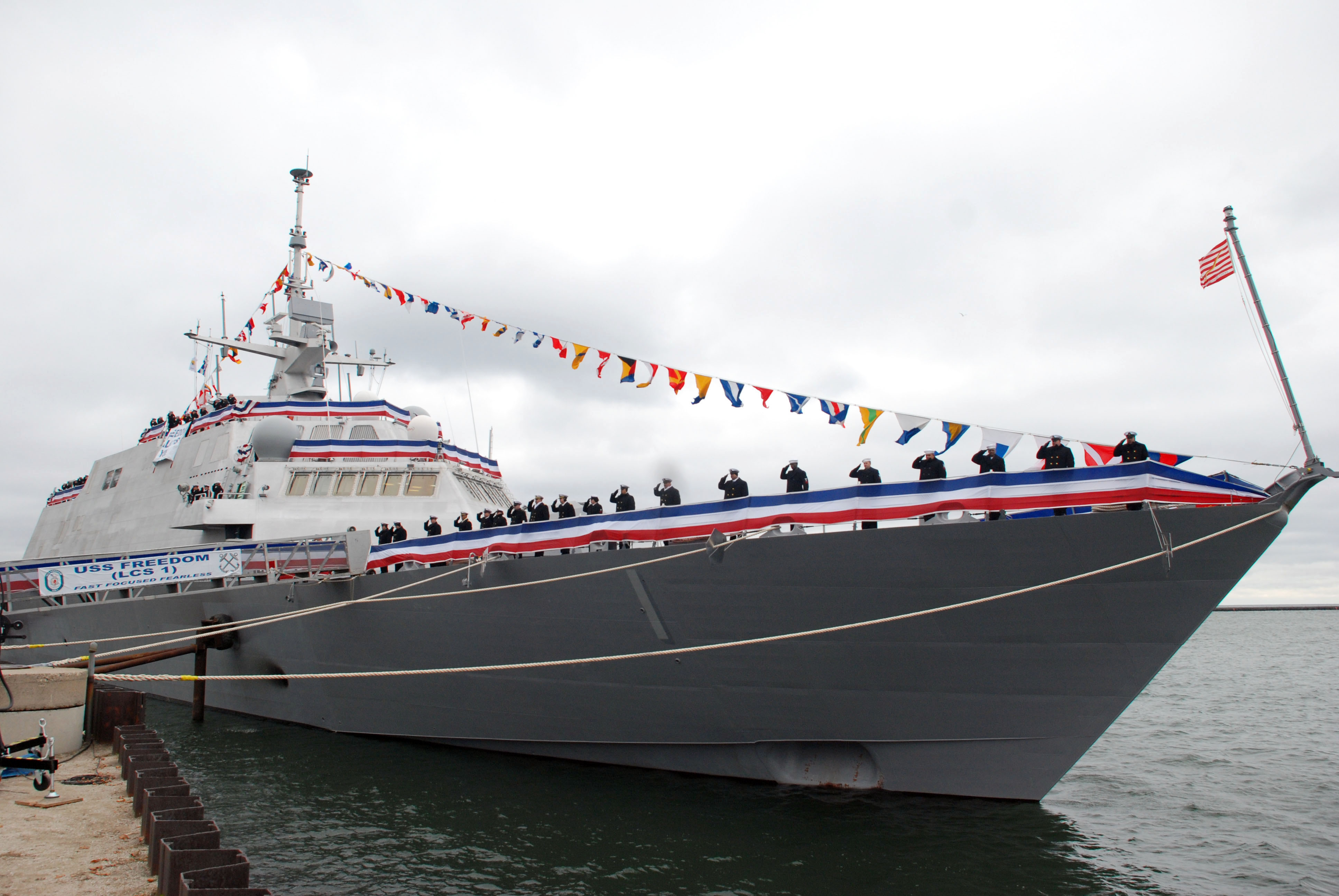
Freedom, the first LCS, on commissioning day

In 2003, the Navy launched its first experimental LCS, Sea Fighter, designated as fast sea frame or FSF-1. In 2005, the SWATH-hulled Sea Fighter entered service as an experimental vessel using mission modules. As the Oliver Hazard Perry, Osprey, and Avenger classes were reaching the end of their lives, the U.S. Navy released the LCS requirement. In 2004, Lockheed Martin, General Dynamics and Raytheon submitted design proposals. It was decided to produce two vessels each (Flight 0) of the Lockheed Martin design (LCS-1 and LCS-3) and of the General Dynamics design (LCS-2 and LCS-4). After these are brought into service, and experience gathered on the design's usability and efficiency, the future design for the class would be chosen (Flight I). The ultimate decision was to fund both designs as two variants of the class. On 9 May 2005, Secretary of the Navy Gordon R. England announced that the first LCS would be named USS Freedom. Her keel was laid down on 2 June 2005 at Marinette Marine, Marinette, Wisconsin. The contract to build the ship was managed by Lockheed's Maritime Systems and Sensors (MS2) division, directed by Fred Moosally. On 23 September 2006, LCS-1 was christened and launched at the Marinette Marine shipyard. On 19 January 2006, the keel for the General Dynamics trimaran, USS Independence, was laid at the Austal USA shipyards in Mobile, Alabama. LCS-2 was launched 30 April 2008.

== Operational history ==
=== Deployments and budget overruns ===
In 2007, the U.S. Navy canceled contracts to build LCS-3 of Lockheed Martin and LCS-4 of General Dynamics and Austal USA, citing failure to control cost overruns. Subsequently, the Navy announced a new bidding process for the next three ships, the winner building two ships and the loser building one. In the 26 September 2008 U.S. presidential debate, Senator John McCain (R-AZ) cited the LCS as an example of botched contracting driving up costs unnecessarily. In March 2009, then-Secretary of the Navy Donald C. Winter announced that LCS-3 would be named Fort Worth after Fort Worth, Texas, and the fourth ship would be named Coronado after Coronado, California. The contracts for LCS-3 and LCS-4 were renewed in early 2009.

In April 2009, the Navy announced its revised procurement plan that three ships be funded in the FY 2010 budget; officials also hinted that the Navy may not down-select to one design for further orders, pointing out complementary features of the two designs. Former Secretary of the Navy John Lehman called for fixed-price contracts to be adopted. Pressure mounted in Congress for the Navy to control the cost: in June 2009, during a hearing of the House Armed Services Seapower Subcommittee, Subcommittee Chairman Gene Taylor, D-Miss, said that other contractors would be keen to build LCS as the subcommittee added language requiring the Navy to open bidding if either lead contractor walked away from the offered $460 million fixed price contracts. In response, the Naval Sea Systems Command conducted a study on whether reducing the top speed requirement from 40 knots to 30 could help keep the ships under the price cap.

The Congress asked the Navy to study improvement programs on existing ships in place of the LCS program. In June 2009, Vice Admiral Barry McCullough, USN testified in a Senate Armed Services Committee meeting that the Oliver Hazard Perry-class frigates and Avenger-class minesweepers were too worn out to cover the gap if the LCS suffered further delays. Retired Admiral James Lyons, USN called for a $220 million common design with the U.S. Coast Guard's National Security Cutter (NSC) program to save costs and meet "limited warfare requirements". A Huntington-Ingalls study found that the NSC would be a better match for the listed mission set while lacking the LCS's mission modules to perform many missions.

In May 2012, Northrop Grumman Aerospace Systems released a study that claimed seven LCS can more efficiently perform anti-piracy patrols in the Western Indian Ocean than a fleet of 20 conventional ships for a quarter of the cost. To help reduce cost of each ships, in September 2009, Navy Acquisition Chief Sean Stackley and Vice Admiral Barry McCullough indicated that only one contractor would be offered a fixed price contract in 2010 for up to ten ships, followed by an offer to build five additional ships of the same design as the first contract to the secondary builder. The Congress agreed with the Navy on this plan. On 23 August 2010, the U.S. Navy announced a delay in awarding the contract for 10 ships until the year's end.

FY 2010 budget documents revealed that the total costs of the two lead ships had risen to $637 million for Freedom and $704 million for Independence. On 16 January 2010, Independence was commissioned in Mobile, Alabama.

The Government Accountability Office (GAO) found that deploying the first two ships will delay the overall program because these two ships were not available for testing and development so changes may have to be made in the second pair of ships during construction instead of in advance. The U.S. Navy responded that "Early deployment brought LCS operational issues to the forefront much sooner than under the original schedule, some of which would not have been learnt until two years on."

In 2013, Under Secretary of the Navy Robert O. Work explained that cost overruns were partly due to the shipbuilders' bidding to American Bureau of Shipping commercial standards, the Navy changed this to Level I survivability standards for greater crew survivability, although the ships were not expected to operate after being hit. The Navy acknowledged that their failure to communicate clearly that the experimental and developmental nature of the first two ships caused a perception that the overall LCS program was in worse shape. A GAO report in July 2014 found that the annual cost to operate an LCS was $79 million, compared to $54 million to operate a larger frigate. Navy Secretary Ray Mabus pointed out that new vessels traditionally start off costing more to operate because of difficulties with building and testing ships simultaneously; GAO reports of new warships since the 1960s support this claim. As more littoral combat ships are built and enter service, Mabus said operational costs will decline to acceptable limits. On 2 November 2016 the Pentagon blocked publication of cost overruns on both designs.

On 2 December 2016, it was reported that the GAO was critical of the LCS's ability to complete a navy requirement of 30 consecutive days underway without a critical failure of one or more essential subsystems. DOT&E Michael Gilmore states that the current LCS fleet "have a near-zero chance" of meeting this requirement.

=== Building both designs ===
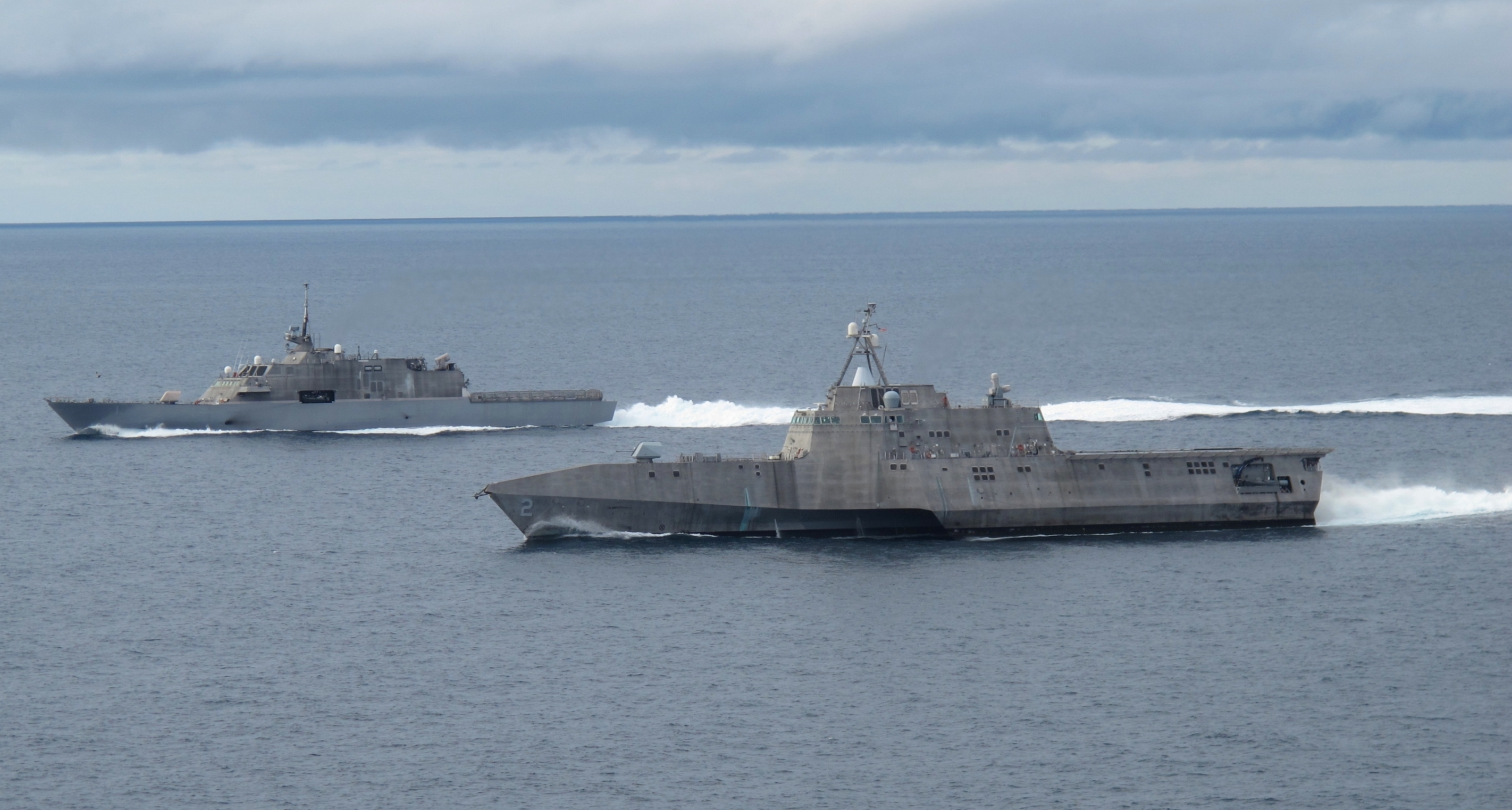
The first ships of each class of littoral combat ships, USS Freedom and USS Independence, maneuver together during an exercise off the coast of Southern California, 2011

Instead of declaring a winner out of the two competing designs, the U.S. Navy in November 2010 asked the Congress to allow for the order of ten of each design. U.S. Senator Carl Levin (D-MI) said that the change was made because both bids were under the Congressional price cap. Pentagon press secretary Geoff Morrell said that unlike the possibility of splitting orders for projects like KC-X or the General Electric/Rolls-Royce F136, the Pentagon had already paid the development cost for both designs so there was no further development required for both designs and have them compete for future orders.

In December 2010, the Government Accountability Office identified some problems with the designs including extremely long crew training time, unrealistic maintenance plans, and the lack of comprehensive risk assessment. On 13 December 2010, both production teams extended their contract offers until 30 December in order to give more time for the Navy to push through the plan. The Navy would be forced to award the contract to only one team if it failed to secure Congressional approval. The Navy budgeted $490 million for each ship while the Congressional Budget Office projected a cost of $591 million for each ship. Navy acquisition chief Sean Stackley testified to a Senate panel that the actual price range was $440 to $460 million.

A day before the offer's expiration, both Lockheed Martin and Austal USA received Navy contracts for an additional ten ships of their designs; two ships of each design being built each year between 2011 and 2015. Lockheed Martin's LCS-5 had a contractual price of $437 million, Austal USA's contractual price for LCS-6 was $432 million. On 29 December 2010, Department of Navy Undersecretary Sean Stackley noted that the program was well within the Congressional cost cap of $480 million per ship. The average per-ship target price for Lockheed ships is $362 million, Stackley said, with a goal of $352 million for each Austal USA ships. Government-furnished equipment (GFE), such as weapons, add about $25 million per ship; another $20 million for change orders, and "management reserve" is also included. Stackley declared the average cost to buy an LCS should be between $430 million and $440 million. In the fiscal year 2011, the unit cost was $1.8 billion and the program cost $3.7 billion.

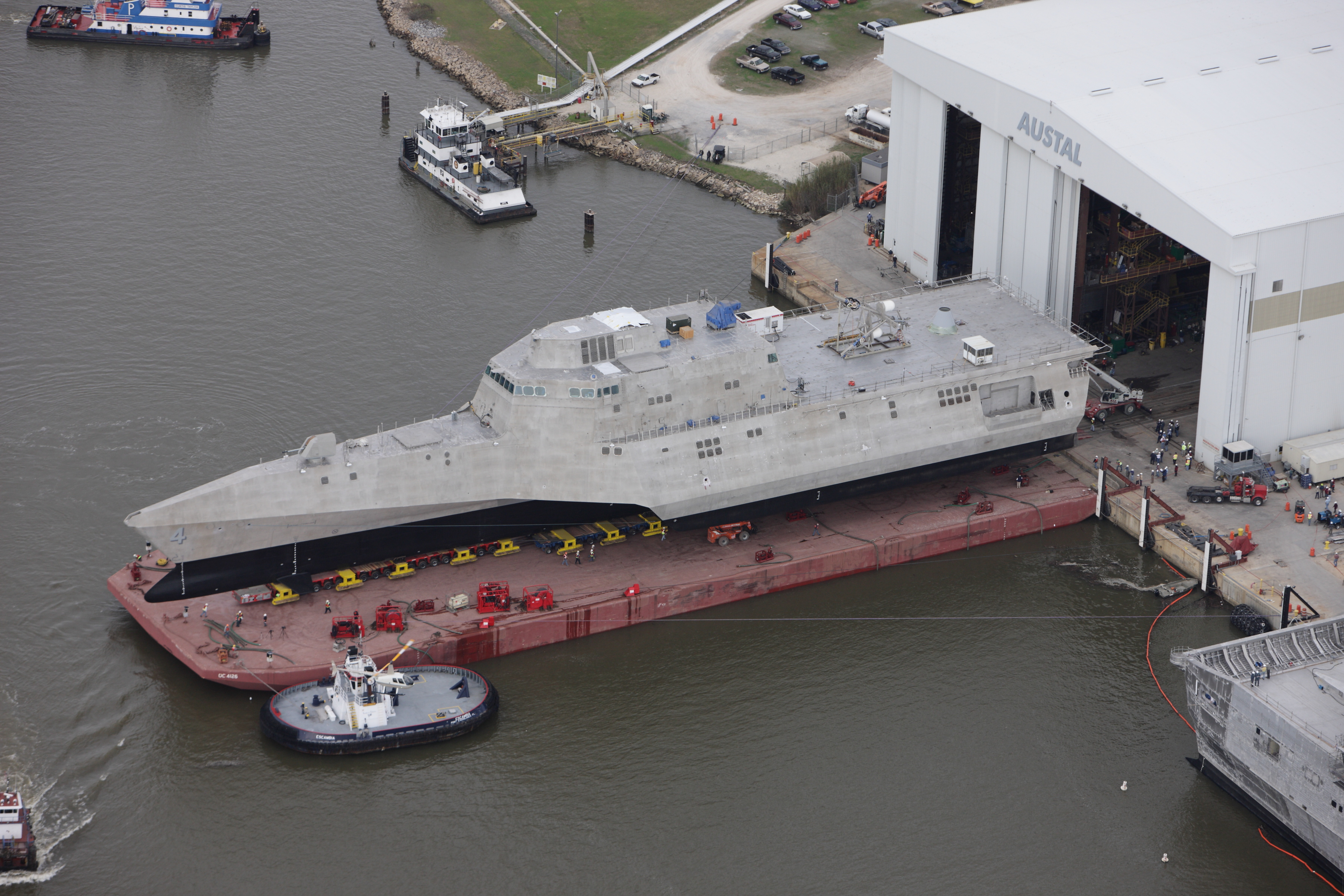
USS Coronado is rolled out in 2011

In May 2012, Robert Work said that the two designs may each be best suited to different theaters, the LCS-1 design being better suited for the enclosed waters of the Middle East, while the LCS-2 design for the Pacific Ocean's open waters. In order to increase commonality, the Navy will force both types to use the same combat system electronics.

The handoff from General Dynamics to Austal of management for the Independence class led to a 13-month schedule slip as the company struggled with building the JHSV ships at the same facilities. In May 2013, the GAO called for a pause in ship construction until issues with the sea frames and modules were resolved. In August 2013, the USN revealed plans to reduce the procurement rate in 2016.

=== Operational issues ===
A 2012 report by Rear Admiral Samuel Perez, USN, found that the ships lacked the manpower and firepower to complete the missions required by regional combatant commanders. The report found that the LCS is "ill-suited for combat operations against anything but" small, fast boats not armed with anti-ship missiles. It also found that the excessive beam (width) of the trimaran Independence-class ships may pose a "navigational challenge in narrow waterways and tight harbors". The report also found that the contractor-based maintenance scheme for the ships had led to poorly supervised and unaccountable contractors leaving problems unresolved. As contract workers are required to be American, they must be flown out to any foreign ports visited by an LCS. A special panel was appointed to investigate "challenges identified". Twenty more bunks were installed to allow for a larger crew.

In 2013, Captain Kenneth Coleman, the U.S. Navy's requirements officer for the program, identified the LCS as being especially vulnerable to tactical aircraft armed with standoff anti-ship missiles. Vice Admiral Thomas H. Copeman III is reported to be considering an upsized "Super" LCS, with space to install needed firepower, because he noted that the 57 mm main gun was more suitable to a patrol boat than a frigate. Austal's vice president for sales, Craig Hooper, suggested that the ships should instead be used for UAV operations. Navy Secretary Ray Mabus has called the lack of identified missions for the LCS "one of its greatest strengths". The various modules all use the same Internet Protocol formats. In 2013, Congressional auditors found that the ships lacked robust communications systems and a USN review "uncovered classified deficiencies" in the ship's cyberdefenses.

At a July 2013 hearing, the House Armed Services Committee's seapower subcommittee argued with Vice Admiral Richard W. Hunt on how the LCS would be employed if tensions with North Korea or China led to a confrontation in the Western Pacific. Hunt said the ships are designed in accordance with the Navy's survivability standards, and that the LCS would be used during the initial phase in the theatre and sense the environment before hostilities occur. Detractors claim the LCS is not survivable enough for long-range threats that China possesses; LCSs are built to the Navy's survivability category Level I+, higher than Level I patrol craft and mine warfare ships, but lower than the Level II Oliver Hazard Perry-class frigate they are replacing. The Navy has said the LCS was designed to pull out of combat upon sustaining damage.

The baseline LCS seaframe designs have a better air and missile defense capability than the partially disarmed and now retired Perry class, which somewhat counters claims that LCS is "unsurvivable". Other observers suggest that the ships' lifecycle costs and resilience challenges result from the optimal-manning concept, which increases the Navy's dependence on contractors and diminishes opportunities to monitor and repair engineering systems during operations.

The deployment of USS Freedom was seen by the Navy as an opportunity to test the ship and operational concepts in the real-world. The Navy was about to conclude a war game at the Naval War College to examine ways of exploiting LCS capabilities in Western Pacific and other scenarios. Hunt added that the anti-submarine warfare (ASW) mission package would play an important role in protecting aircraft carriers and amphibious ships, and the mine countermeasures (MCMs) mission package would also provide necessary port security and waterway patrol capability following combat operations.

In April 2014, a Government Accountability Office report found that several U.S. 7th Fleet officials thought the LCS was more useful in the Persian Gulf, but not suitable in the Pacific theater as they lacked the speed, range, and electronic warfare capabilities. The first two vessels from each maker were found to be overweight and not meeting performance requirements for endurance or sprinting over 40 knots. Navy leaders contend that the LCS's shallow draft is well suited for Pacific operations due to the many shallow-water ports, typically difficult for larger warships to access. The GAO report recommended the Navy consider buying fewer ships of the type if its limitations prevent effective use in the Pacific theater. The GAO also found that both designs were overweight and underperforming.

=== Revised requirements and designs ===
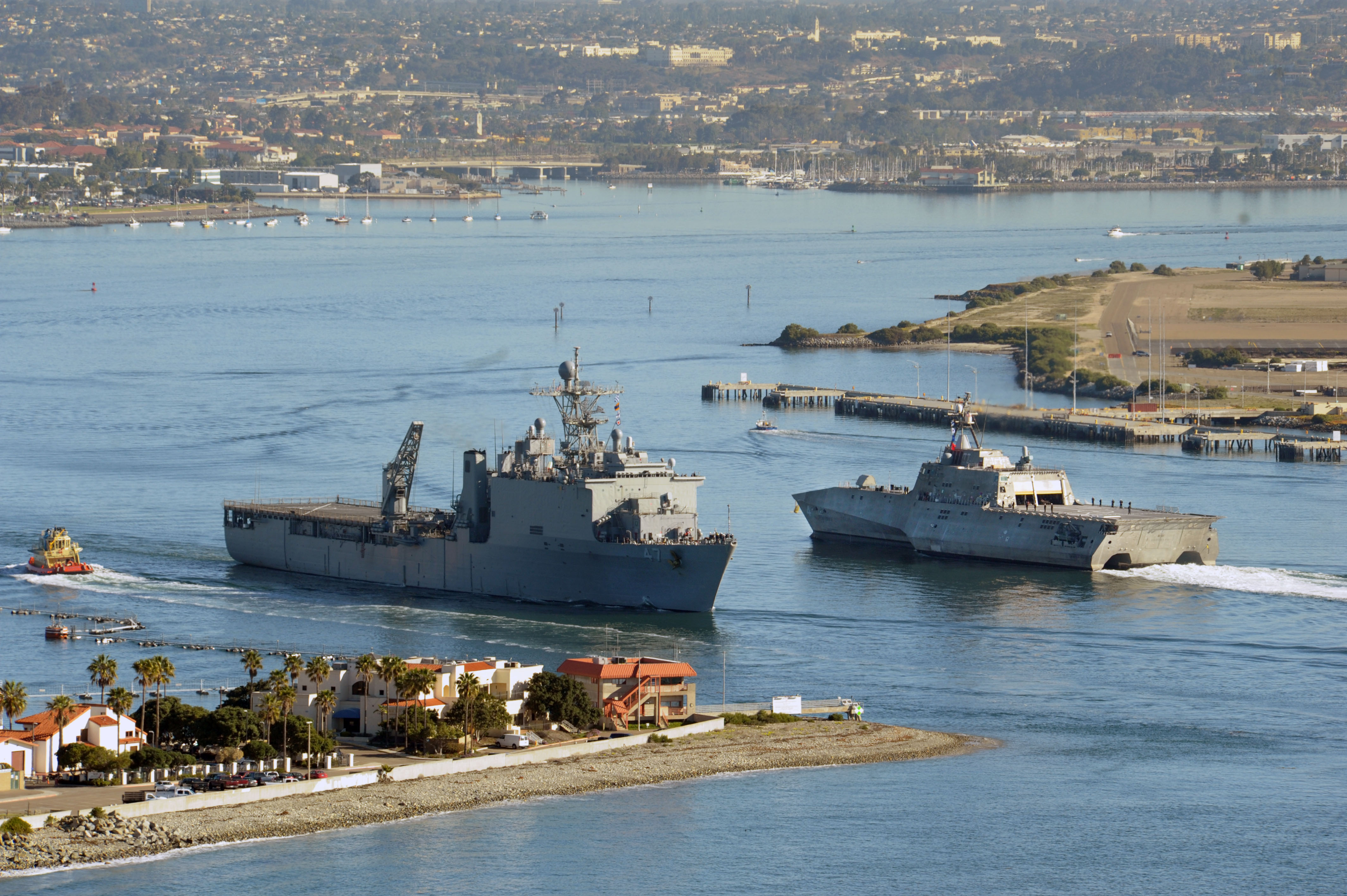
USS Coronado (LCS-4) (right) passes USS Rushmore

A 2013 DOT&E report on the two LCSs raised doubts about their survivability, as they did not include features for sustained combat operations. Concerned that the LCS would make up one-sixth of the Navy's 300-ship force, Secretary of Defense Chuck Hagel directed the Navy to submit alternative proposals for a versatile small surface combatant (SSC) comparable to a frigate. Options considered included the Legend class in use by the U.S. Coast Guard, three Freedom-class variants of differing size, an Aegis-equipped version of the Independence class, and lastly, an American-built version of the Spanish Navy's F-100-class frigate.

In April 2014, the Navy issued two requests for information (RFI) to industry. Lockheed Martin responded with a variant of their Freedom-class LCS; upgrades included an increase in length to 125 m (410 ft), vertical launch systems for Standard Missile 2 missiles or the Standard Missile 6, and the SPY-1F Aegis radar or an Air Missile Defense Radar derivative.

Austal USA submitted a modified Independence-class ship, replacing the LCS' mission modules with permanent systems like a towed array sonar, torpedoes, vertical launch anti-submarine rockets, and aviation capability to support MH-60 helicopters. Like Lockheed's submission, it had a vertical launch system for Standard missiles, a 76 mm gun in place of the 57 mm gun, and could take on an Aegis or ADMR radar. Huntington Ingalls Industries submitted a larger, more heavily armed Legend-class cutter. General Dynamics provided an unspecified response.

Results from the Navy task force on LCS upgrades, capabilities, costs, and alternative options were completed by July 2014 for the Office of the Secretary of Defense (OSD) to review. In December 2014, Hagel accepted the Navy's recommendation to base the remaining 20 SSCs on more powerful versions of both existing LCS designs. The new SSC was planned to have an improved 3D air defense radar, air defense decoys, better electronic warfare systems, over-the-horizon anti-ship missiles, multi-function towed array sonar, torpedo defenses, additional armor, and less displacement than Flight 0 vessels.

The new SSC would now focus on anti-submarine and anti-surface warfare, with mine countermeasures handled by existing LCSs. It would retain the ability to carry mission modules and LCS mission package equipment, including 30 mm and 57 mm cannons, Hellfire missiles, 11-meter (36 ft) RHIBs, and the ASW variable-depth sonar. Other planned enhancements include spaced armor, installation of Mk 38 Mod 2 25 mm chain guns, improved decoy systems, the SeaRAM missile interceptor, a "lite" version of the Surface Electronic Warfare Improvement Program (SEWIP), and improved signature management through degaussing.

This new SSC was projected to cost $60–$75 million more than a Flight 0 LCS, with procurement beginning by 2019. Hagel also directed the Navy to study which improvements could be fitted to completed and incomplete LCSs. This new design would decision prioritize surface and submarine defenses over anti-aircraft or missile defense, which would be left instead to large surface combatants. Contrary to industry submissions and advice from naval experts, vertical launch systems were not included in the new designs for reasons of weight and cost.

In January 2015, the Navy announced that the up-gunned LCS would be reclassified as a frigate. Hull designations were changed from LCS to FF, including LCSs back-fitted with modifications. The Navy planned to start upgrading existing and incomplete LCSs before 2019. To free up weight for the new systems, the frigates removed LCS equipment that was no longer needed, such as the handling equipment needed to launch and recover the RMMV for the MCM mission package. To accommodate the changes while using the same hull designs, the original LCS high sprint speed was dropped. The LCS' two 11-meter RHIBs were replaced with two 7-meter equivalents.

A September 2015 report indicated that the first 24 ships would retain the basic design principles of the LCS program, with upgrades where needed. This group would be considered "Block 0" and retain the "LCS" designation, for the time being. Ships 25 to 32, "Block 1" would include significant upgrades and design changes, inline with the intended capabilities of the last 20 ships of the total 52-ship procurement, these being the new "Fast Frigate" class as designated by then Secretary of the Navy Ray Mabus. The new frigates would be larger, with increased defensive and survivability capabilities.

In July 2017, the Navy issued a request for information for a new multi-mission guided-missile frigate (FFG(X)) that would be more capable than the modified LCS design. In April 2020, the Navy selected a design based on the Italian/French FREMM multi-purpose frigate for its new frigate program, named the Constellation class (FFG-62). The plan to build enhanced versions of the LCS and redesignate them as frigates was later determined to be little more than a rebranding effort and was ultimately abandoned in favor of the new frigate program.

=== Reduced procurement and early retirement ===
In December 2015, Secretary of Defense Ashton Carter ordered the Navy to reduce the planned procurement of LCS and FF ships from 52 to 40, and down-select to one variant by FY 2019. The intent of this cut was to reallocate funds to other priorities, including buying more F-35C Lightning II and F/A-18E/F Super Hornet fighters, and SM-6 missiles, accelerating Flight III Arleigh Burke-class destroyer DDG-51 acquisition, and expanding development of the Virginia Payload Module (VPM) for the Block V Virginia-class submarine. Though fewer ships would be available in some instances, those needs were expected to be met by higher-end vessels.

In February 2020, media reports stated that the U.S. Navy proposed to retire the first four LCSs in 2021 as part of a cost-savings measure. If approved, these would have been USS Freedom and USS Fort Worth from the Freedom class, and USS Independence and USS Coronado from the Independence class.

In June 2021, Naval News reported that, in a report to Congress, the Navy planned to inactivate Fort Worth, Coronado, Detroit and Little Rock in Fiscal Year 2022 and put them on the Out of Commission in Reserve (OCIR) list. In the final budget Congress forbade the Navy from retiring the three Freedom class ships in Fiscal Year 2022. By May 2022, the Navy shifted its plans to decommission nine LCS warships in Fiscal Year 2023, citing their ineffective anti-submarine warfare system, their inability to perform any of the Navy's missions, constant breakdowns, and structural failures in high-stress areas of the ships.

As of January 2026, in light of China's expanding fleet, the Navy had canceled plans to retire seven LCS hulls and will keep a fleet of 28 of the ships. It envisions their use in the mine clearing mission, replacing the Avenger class and is experimenting with using them as a support platform for robotic aircraft and ships.

== Foreign sales ==
In 2012, Saudi Arabia and Israel both expressed an interest in a modified version of the Freedom variant, the LCS-I. In 2022, Israel dropped out of this project in favor of a new frigate design to be built in Israel. Interest by Saudi Arabia in LCS continued. Media reports indicate that Saudi Arabia could buy two to four ships of Lockheed Martin's Freedom-class LCS variant as part of the Saudi Arabian Naval Expansion Program II—a program to modernize the nation's oldest warships operating in the Persian Gulf. In May 2017, as part of an arms deal between the United States and Saudi Arabia, the acquisition of four Multi-Mission Surface Combatant (MMSC) ships based on the Freedom-class LCS was announced.

In October 2010, the Taiwanese navy showed interest in procuring U.S. littoral combat ships, to replace aging Knox-class frigates. In November 2023, Taiwanese media reported that the Taiwanese navy was planning to procure littoral combat ships with support from the Legislative Yuan. The Taiwanese navy denied the plan. According to analysts, the probability of introducing LCS to Taiwan was low due the incompatibility with existing naval infrastructure and combat system, high maintenance requirement, high cost of sustainment, and the possibility of introducing a propaganda opportunity for China, considering LCS's poor reputation.

Japan will design its own version of the Independence class. The warship concept was unveiled in the defense trade-show MAST Asia 2017.

The Royal Malaysian Navy has built its littoral combat ship based on the Gowind-class design, named Maharaja Lela-class frigate.

== List of littoral combat ships ==
As of May 2026, a total of 35 littoral combat ships is planned, including 16 Freedom-class ships and 19 Independence-class ships. Ships are assigned to either Littoral Combat Ship Squadron One, based in San Diego, California, or Littoral Combat Ship Squadron Two, based in Mayport, Florida

List of littoral combat ships
Hull	Name	Variant	Comm.	Decomm.	Homeport	Builder	Notes
LCS-1	USS Freedom	Freedom	8 Oct 2008	29 Sep 2021	N/A	Marinette Marine	Decommissioned 29 Sep 2021 in San Diego
LCS-2	USS Independence	Independence	16 Oct 2010	29 Jul 2021	N/A	Austal USA	Decommissioned 29 Jul 2021 in San Diego
LCS-3	USS Fort Worth	Freedom	22 Sep 2012	29 July 2026	Naval Base San Diego	Marinette Marine	Decommissioned 29 July 2026
LCS-4	USS Coronado	Independence	5 Apr 2014	14 Sep 2022	N/A	Austal USA	Decommissioned 14 Sep 2022 in San Diego
LCS-5	USS Milwaukee	Freedom	15 Nov 2015	8 Sep 2023	N/A	Marinette Marine	Decommissioned 8 Sep 2023 in Mayport
LCS-6	USS Jackson	Independence	5 Dec 2015		Naval Base San Diego	Austal USA	Scheduled to be decommissioned in 2024.
LCS-7	USS Detroit	Freedom	22 Oct 2016	29 Sep 2023	Philadelphia Navy Yard	Marinette Marine	On hold at NISMF pending foreign military sale
LCS-8	USS Montgomery	Independence	10 Sep 2016		Naval Base San Diego	Austal USA	Scheduled to be decommissioned in 2024.
LCS-9	USS Little Rock	Freedom	16 Dec 2017	29 Sep 2023	Philadelphia Navy Yard	Marinette Marine	On hold at NISMF pending foreign military sale
LCS-10	USS Gabrielle Giffords	Independence	10 Jun 2017		Naval Base San Diego	Austal USA	
LCS-11	USS Sioux City	Freedom	17 Nov 2018	14 Aug 2023	N/A	Marinette Marine	Decommissioned 14 Aug 2023 in Mayport
LCS-12	USS Omaha	Independence	3 Feb 2018		Naval Base San Diego	Austal USA	
LCS-13	USS Wichita	Freedom	12 Jan 2019		Naval Station Mayport	Marinette Marine	
LCS-14	USS Manchester	Independence	26 May 2018		Naval Base San Diego	Austal USA	
LCS-15	USS Billings	Freedom	3 Aug 2019		Naval Station Mayport	Marinette Marine	
LCS-16	USS Tulsa	Independence	16 Feb 2019		Naval Base San Diego	Austal USA	
LCS-17	USS Indianapolis	Freedom	26 Oct 2019		Naval Station Mayport	Marinette Marine	
LCS-18	USS Charleston	Independence	2 Mar 2019		Naval Base San Diego	Austal USA	
LCS-19	USS St. Louis	Freedom	8 Aug 2020		Naval Station Mayport	Marinette Marine	
LCS-20	USS Cincinnati	Independence	5 Oct 2019		Naval Base San Diego	Austal USA	
LCS-21	USS Minneapolis-Saint Paul	Freedom	21 May 2022		Naval Station Mayport	Marinette Marine	
LCS-22	USS Kansas City	Independence	20 Jun 2020		Naval Base San Diego	Austal USA	
LCS-23	USS Cooperstown	Freedom	6 May 2023		Naval Station Mayport	Marinette Marine	
LCS-24	USS Oakland	Independence	17 Apr 2021		Naval Base San Diego	Austal USA	
LCS-25	USS Marinette	Freedom	16 Sep 2023		Naval Station Mayport	Marinette Marine	
LCS-26	USS Mobile	Independence	22 May 2021		Naval Base San Diego	Austal USA	
LCS-27	USS Nantucket	Freedom	16 Nov 2024		Naval Station Mayport	Marinette Marine	
LCS-28	USS Savannah	Independence	5 Feb 2022		Naval Base San Diego	Austal USA	
LCS-29	USS Beloit	Freedom	23 Nov 2024		Naval Station Mayport	Marinette Marine	
LCS-30	USS Canberra	Independence	22 Jul 2023		Naval Base San Diego	Austal USA	
LCS-31	USS Cleveland	Freedom	16 May 2026		Naval Station Mayport	Marinette Marine	
LCS-32	USS Santa Barbara	Independence	1 Apr 2023		Naval Base San Diego	Austal USA	
LCS-34	USS Augusta	Independence	30 Sep 2023		Naval Base San Diego	Austal USA	
LCS-36	USS Kingsville	Independence	24 Aug 2024		Naval Base San Diego	Austal USA	
LCS-38	USS Pierre	Independence	15 Nov 2025		Naval Base San Diego	Austal USA	

- Note: The Navy has announced that Cleveland LCS-31 will be the last Freedom-class LCS to be built despite placing orders for Independence-class variants numbered LCS-32, LCS-34, LCS-36, and LCS-38.

== See also ==
- Sea Fighter (FSF-1), experimental USN littoral combat ship
- Project 22160-class patrol ship
- Gowind-class corvette
- Braunschweig-class corvette
- Holland-class offshore patrol vessel
- Kamorta-class corvette
- Khareef-class corvette
- Tuo Chiang-class corvette
- Type 056 corvette
- La Fayette-class frigate
- River-class patrol vessel
- MEKO or "littoral combatant ship"
- Milgem-class corvette
- Sigma-class corvette
- Doha-class corvette
- Fleet-class USV – An unmanned surface vessel designed to be carried by the LCS, and used for MCM & ASW.
- iRobot Seaglider – UUV tested for use with Persistent Littoral Undersea Surveillance (PLUS) prototype system.
- Juliet Marine Systems Ghost, a proposed replacement for the LCS
