= USS Coronado (LCS-4) =

Independence-class littoral combat ship

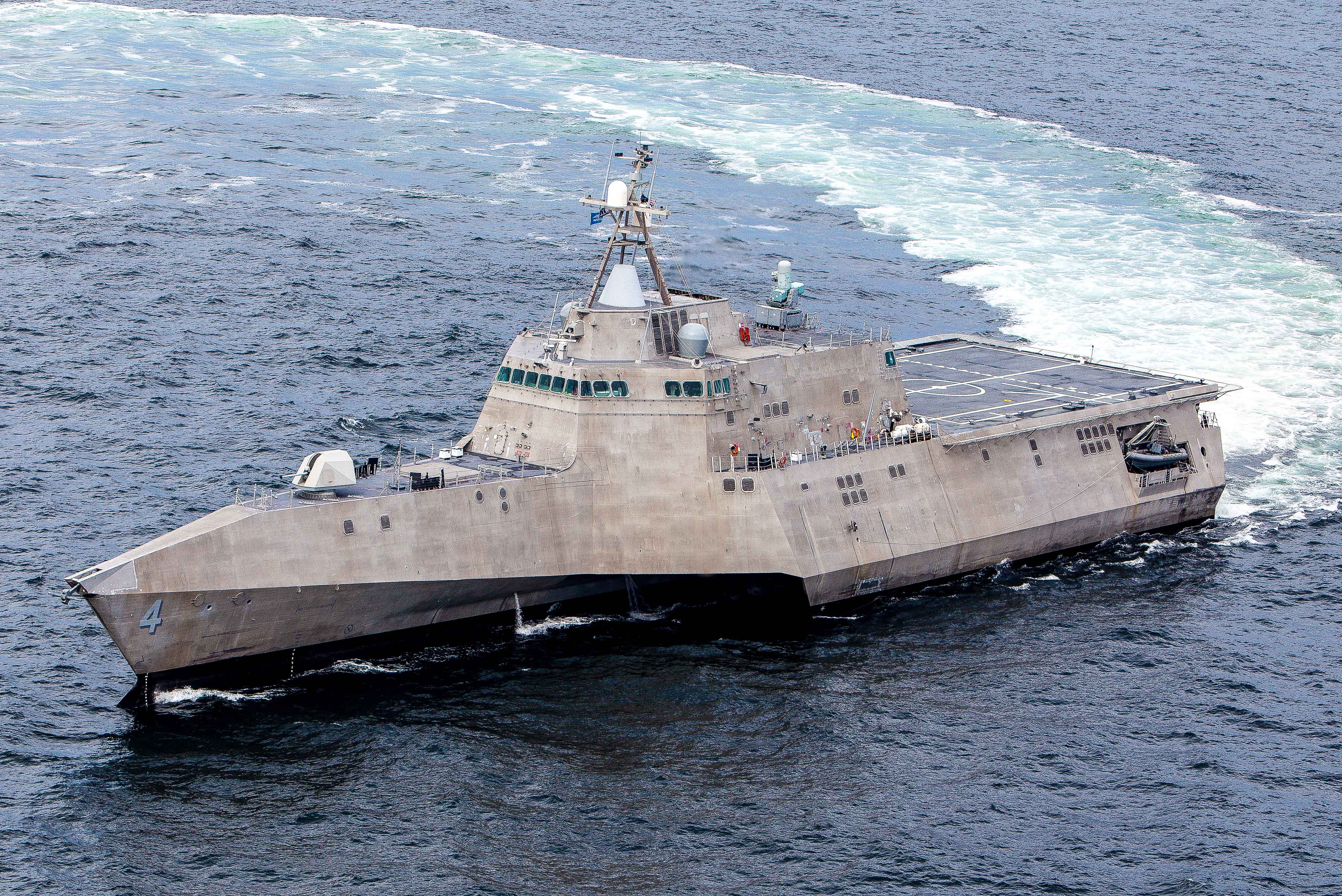
- USS Coronado on 23 August 2013

History

United States
- Name: Coronado
- Namesake: Coronado
- Awarded: 1 May 2009
- Builder: Austal USA
- Laid down: 17 December 2009
- Launched: 14 January 2012
- Christened: 14 January 2012
- Acquired: 27 September 2013
- Commissioned: 5 April 2014
- Decommissioned: 14 September 2022
- Identification: Hull number: LCS-4
- Status: Inactive

General characteristics
- Class & type: Independence-class littoral combat ship
- Displacement: 2,377 long tons (2,415 t); Full load: 3,228 long tons (3,280 t)
- Length: 127.4 m (418 ft)
- Beam: 31.6 m (104 ft)
- Draft: 14 ft (4.27 m)
- Propulsion: 2× General Electric LM2500 gas turbines; 4 × Azimuth thruster; 4 × diesel generators
- Speed: 40+ knots, 47 knots (54 mph; 87 km/h) sprint
- Range: 4,300 nmi (8,000 km; 4,900 mi) at 20 knots (37 km/h; 23 mph)
- Capacity: 210 tonnes
- Complement: 40 core crew (8 officers, 32 enlisted) plus up to 35 mission crew
- Sensors & processing systems: Sea Giraffe 3D Surface/Air RADAR; Bridgemaster-E Navigational RADAR; AN/KAX-2 EO/IR sensor for GFC
- Electronic warfare & decoys: EDO ES-3601 ESM; 4 × SRBOC rapid bloom chaff launchers
- Armament: 1 × Mk 110 57 mm gun; 4 × .50 cal (12.7 mm) guns; Evolved SeaRAM 11-cell missile launcher
- Aircraft carried: 2 × MH-60R/S Seahawks; MQ-8 Fire Scout

USS Coronado (LCS-4) is an Independence-class littoral combat ship. She is the third ship of the United States Navy to be named after Coronado, California.

== Design ==
In 2002, the US Navy initiated a program to develop the first of a fleet of littoral combat ships. The Navy initially ordered two trimaran hulled ships from General Dynamics, which became known as the Independence-class after the first ship of the class, USS Independence. Even-numbered US Navy littoral combat ships are built using the Independence-class trimaran design, while odd-numbered ships are based on a competing design, the conventional monohull Freedom class. The initial order of littoral combat ships involved a total of four ships, including two of the Independence-class design. These vessels were designed to be outfitted with reconfigurable payloads, called mission packages, which can be changed out quickly. Mission packages are supported by special detachments that will deploy manned and unmanned vehicles and sensors.

Coronado is the second Independence-class littoral combat ship, she was built by Austal USA in Mobile, Alabama. Coronado is the first Independence-class ship to carry standard 7-meter (23 ft) rigid-hulled inflatable boats and improvements in corrosion protection and propulsion over the original Independence (LCS-2) design.

== History ==
=== Construction and initial trials ===
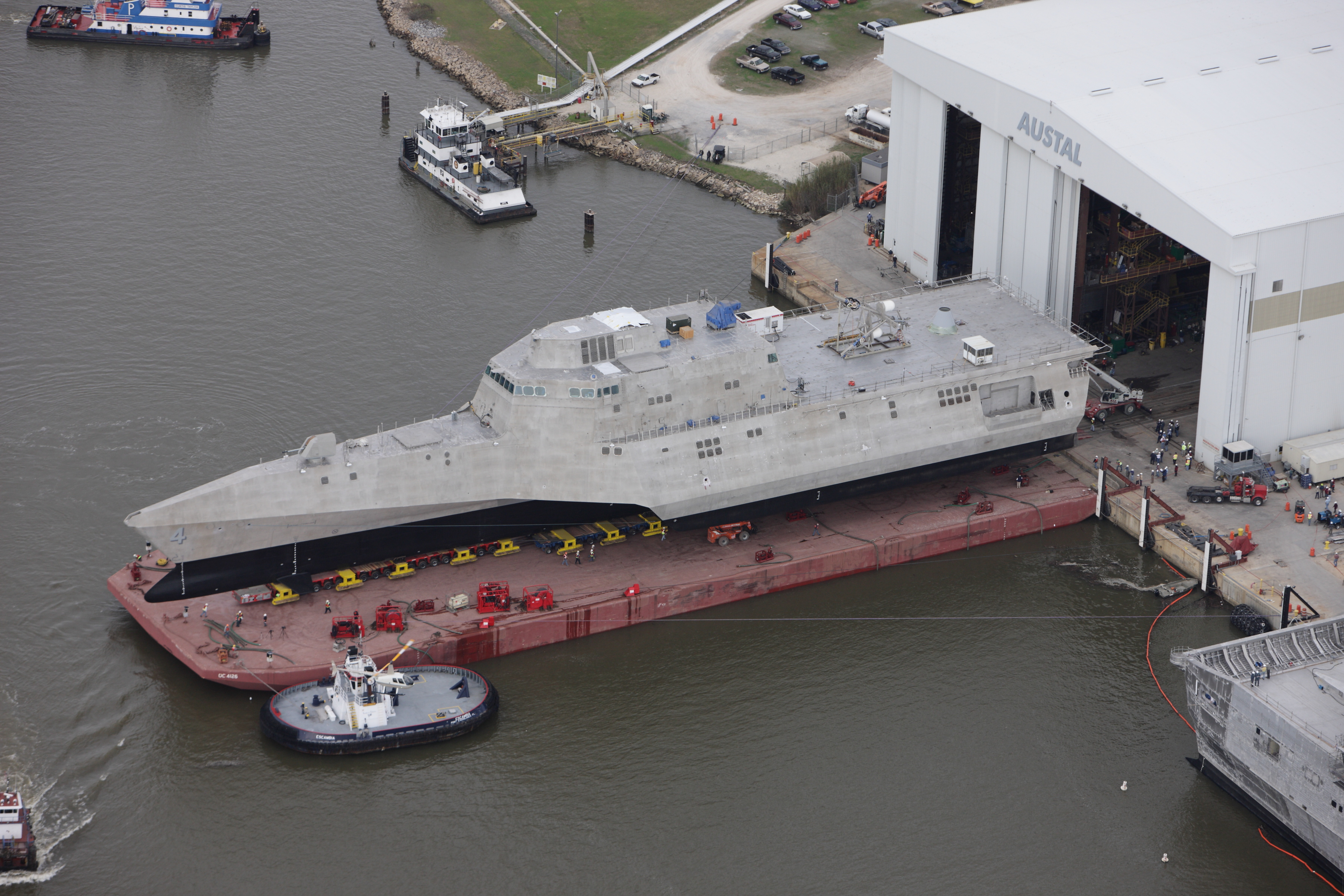
Coronado is floated out on 9 January 2011.

The ship's keel was laid on 17 December 2009. She was launched and christened during a ceremony in Mobile Bay on 14 January 2012 by the ship's sponsor Susan Keith, the daughter of Eleanor Ring, who christened USS Coronado (AGF-11) in 1966. Fire is a concern on all the Independence-class ships, and the delivery of Coronado was delayed by two fires during her builder's trials. USS Coronado was delivered on 27 September 2013, and she departed the Austal USA shipyard on 27 January 2014, en route to her commissioning site in Coronado, California. She was commissioned on 5 April 2014, and assigned to Littoral Combat Ship Squadron One in San Diego, California.

On 30 April 2014, the LCS Mission Modules (MM) program successfully completed the first Structural Test Firing (STF) of the 30 mm gun mission module aboard Coronado. The test consisted of installing two 30 mm guns, mission package software, and associated test equipment, loading live ammunition, and conducting three live fire scenarios: gun operations; worst case blast loading; and sustained fire. Multiple tracking exercises using high-speed maneuvering surface targets to simulate single and swarm-boat attacks were the following day. Surface warfare tracking and live fire exercises were scheduled in summer 2014, culminating in initial operational test and evaluation in 2015. Coronado is the first Independence-class LCS to undergo firings of the 30 mm cannons of the surface warfare mission package.

In late July 2014, the Navy confirmed Coronado would test-launch the Norwegian Naval Strike Missile in September. Although there is no current requirement for the missile aboard Littoral Combat Ships, it is significantly larger than the AGM-114 Hellfire missile slated to be integrated onto the ship classes, and the Navy is testing its feasibility in an increased anti-surface warfare role for the ships. The test was meant to provide insight into the missile's capabilities, see if it could fit aboard the ship, and review the detect-to-engage sequence of firing a long-range weapon from an LCS. The test occurred on 24 September 2014. The missile was successfully fired from a launcher positioned on ship's flight deck at a mobile ship target.

In mid-August 2014, Coronado demonstrated the ability to rapidly stage and deploy US Marine Corps ground units. Marine Light Attack Helicopter Squadrons 469 and 303 conducted day and night deck-landing qualifications in preparation for an airborne raid. The Independence-class LCS' features of high speed, a large flight deck, and configurable mission bay can support air and small-boat employment and delivery of Marine ground and air tactical units; a small Marine ground unit can be carried with an embarked mission module.

On 16 October 2014, the Navy announced Coronado conducted dynamic interface testing with the MQ-8B Fire Scout unmanned helicopter. The tests familiarized the crew with operating the unmanned aircraft, verified and expanded launch and recovery envelopes, and identified opportunities for envelope expansion to demonstrate future concepts of operations for the aircraft aboard an LCS using the Fire Scout in all three mission packages. Final Contract Trials (FCT) for the ship were completed in June 2014, and Coronado was scheduled to begin Post Shakedown Availability in October 2014.

=== Active service: 2016–2022 ===
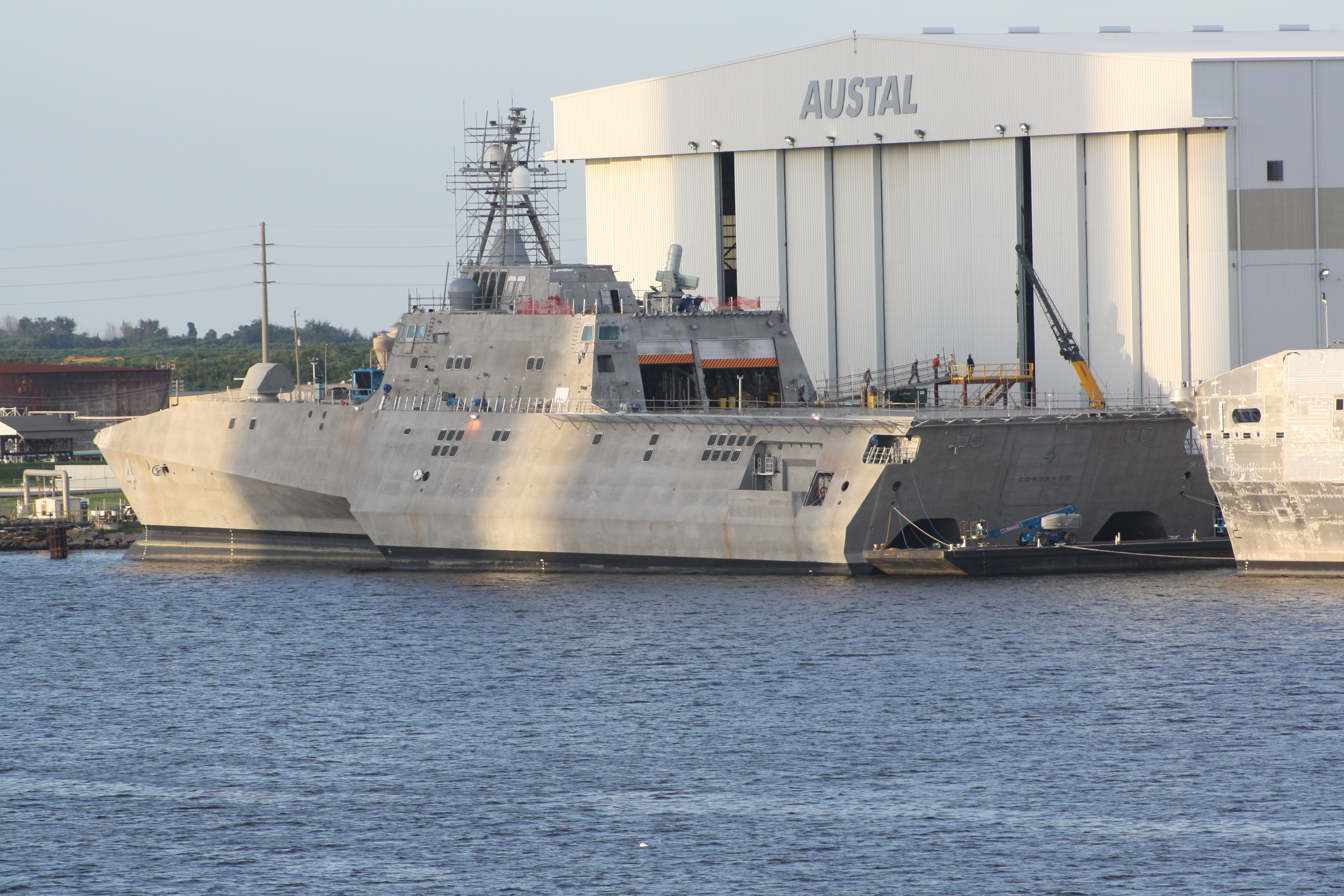
Coronado undergoing final retrofit in Mobile on 1 September 2012

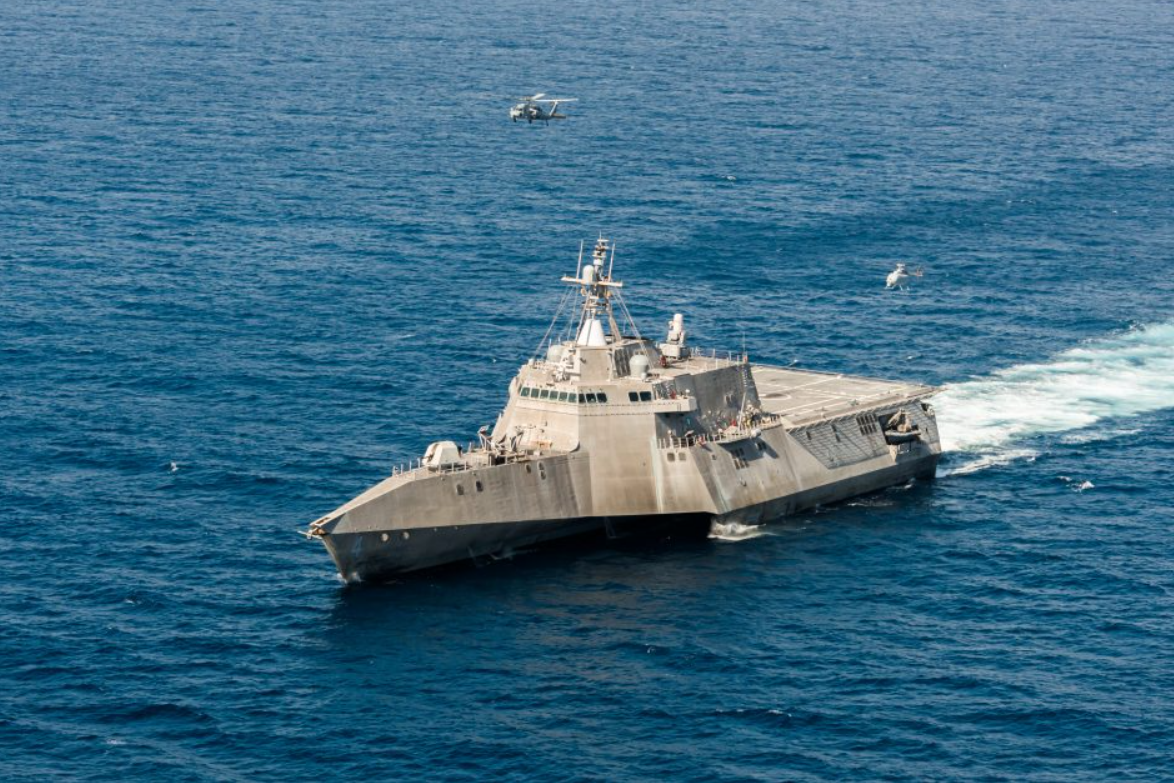
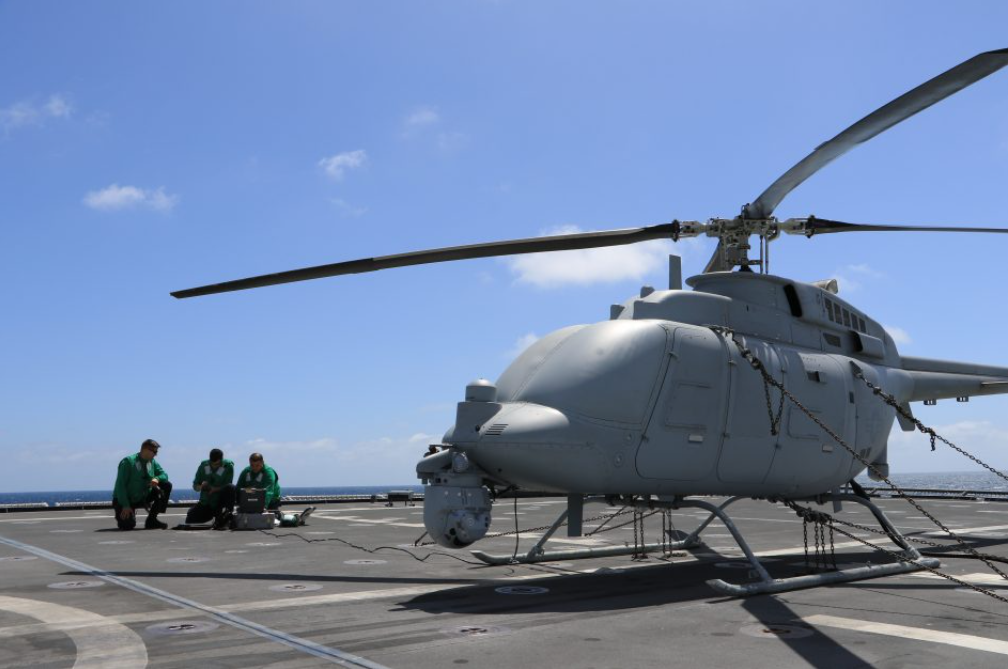
LEFT: Coronado operates with an MH-60S Seahawk helicopter (top center) and an MQ-8C Fire Scout unmanned aircraft (right, above ship's stern) on 28 June 2018. RIGHT: Air Test and Evaluation Squadron 1 (VX-1) personnel analyze diagnostics from an MQ-8C Fire Scout on the flight deck of Coronado on 21 June 2018.

On 19 July 2016, while participating in the Rim of the Pacific Exercise, Coronado conducted a live-fire missile test of a Block 1C Harpoon anti-ship missile. While the missile failed to destroy its target, the test validated the ability to launch high-powered missiles from the forward deck of a littoral combat ship.

On 16 October 2016, Coronado arrived in Singapore for a scheduled rotational deployment to the Indo-Asia-Pacific region. This was the first Independence-class LCS deployment to the region, the first deployment of the MQ-8B fitted with the Telephonics AN/ZPY-4(V)1 radar, and the first deployment of an LCS platform with an over-the-horizon anti-ship capability in the form of a four-cell RGM-84D Harpoon Block 1C missile launcher.

On 29 June 2018, the U.S. Navy completed a comprehensive underway initial operational test and evaluation (IOT&E) for the Northrop Grumman MQ-8C Fire Scout unmanned helicopter by a detachment of Air Test and Evaluation Squadron One (VX-1) embarked on Coronado. The testing included examination of the MQ-8C's ability to work with the ship and with manned helicopters, developing practices for simultaneously operating and maintaining both the MQ-8C and the MH-60S Seahawk helicopter aboard ship which demonstrated that simultaneous operations of the two aircraft were possible, and conducting shipboard maintenance of both the MQ-8C and the MH-60S. Coronado then continued pierside testing of the MQ-8C until mid-July 2018, with a focus on maintenance and cyber technology issues.

In February 2020, the Navy announced the retirement of both Independence and Coronado after ten and six years of service, respectively. The decision came after the Navy discovered cracks in the hull in late 2019, which were exacerbated when the ship sailed at speeds greater than 15 knots (28 km/h; 17 mph) in heavy seas. Evaluations of other Independence-class ships have revealed a further five hulls that are suffering from the same problem, out of the first thirteen vessels of the class. Those other vessels remain in service, albeit with limitations imposed on top speeds in higher sea states.

On 17 March 2020, United States Pacific Fleet reported a crew member of Coronado tested 'positive' for COVID-19, one of the initial ships in the US Navy to report a case. The Coronado crew were at their home port in San Diego, so the sailor quarantined at home. By 26 March 2020, a further eight sailors had tested positive and over thirty had been quarantined in an attempt to contain the spread of the virus.

On 20 June 2020, the US Navy announced they would be taking Coronado out of commission in March 2021, and placing her, along with the littoral combat ships Freedom, Independence, and Fort Worth in reserve. The ship's decommissioning was deferred, and on 18 June 2021, Naval News reported that Coronado would be inactivated in FY 2022 and put on the Out of Commission in Reserve (OCIR) list. Coronado nevertheless took part in Portland Fleet Week 2022, on 8–12 June, along with destroyer USS Michael Monsoor, three US Coast Guard cutters and a pair of Royal Canadian Navy ships.

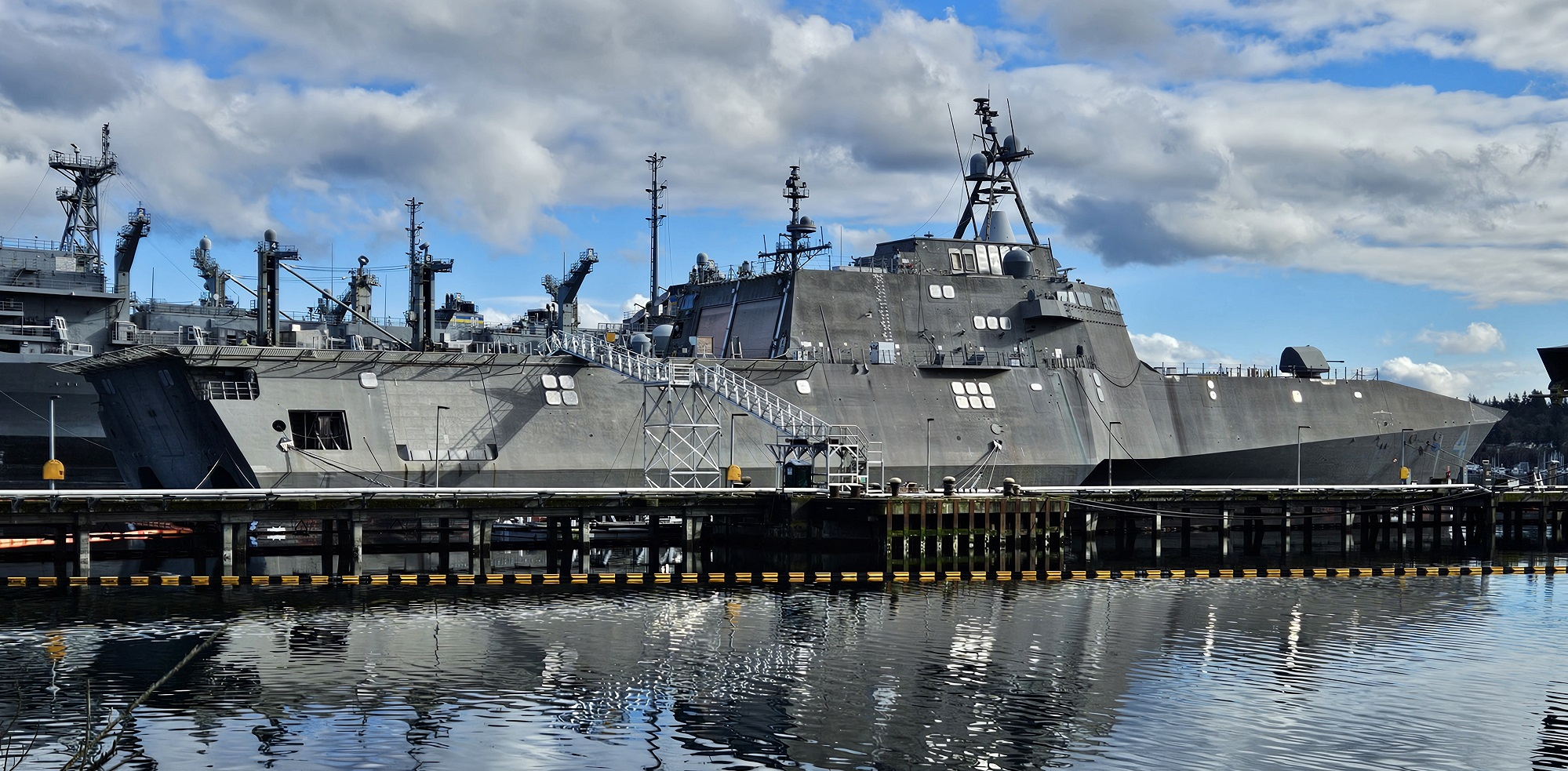
Ex-Coronado in Bremerton, Washington, as of 22 February 2024

Coronado was decommissioned on 14 September 2022 at San Diego, California. As of February 2024, the ship is docked at the Puget Sound Naval Shipyard in Bremerton, Washington.
