= Littoral warfare =

Military operations in coastal waters

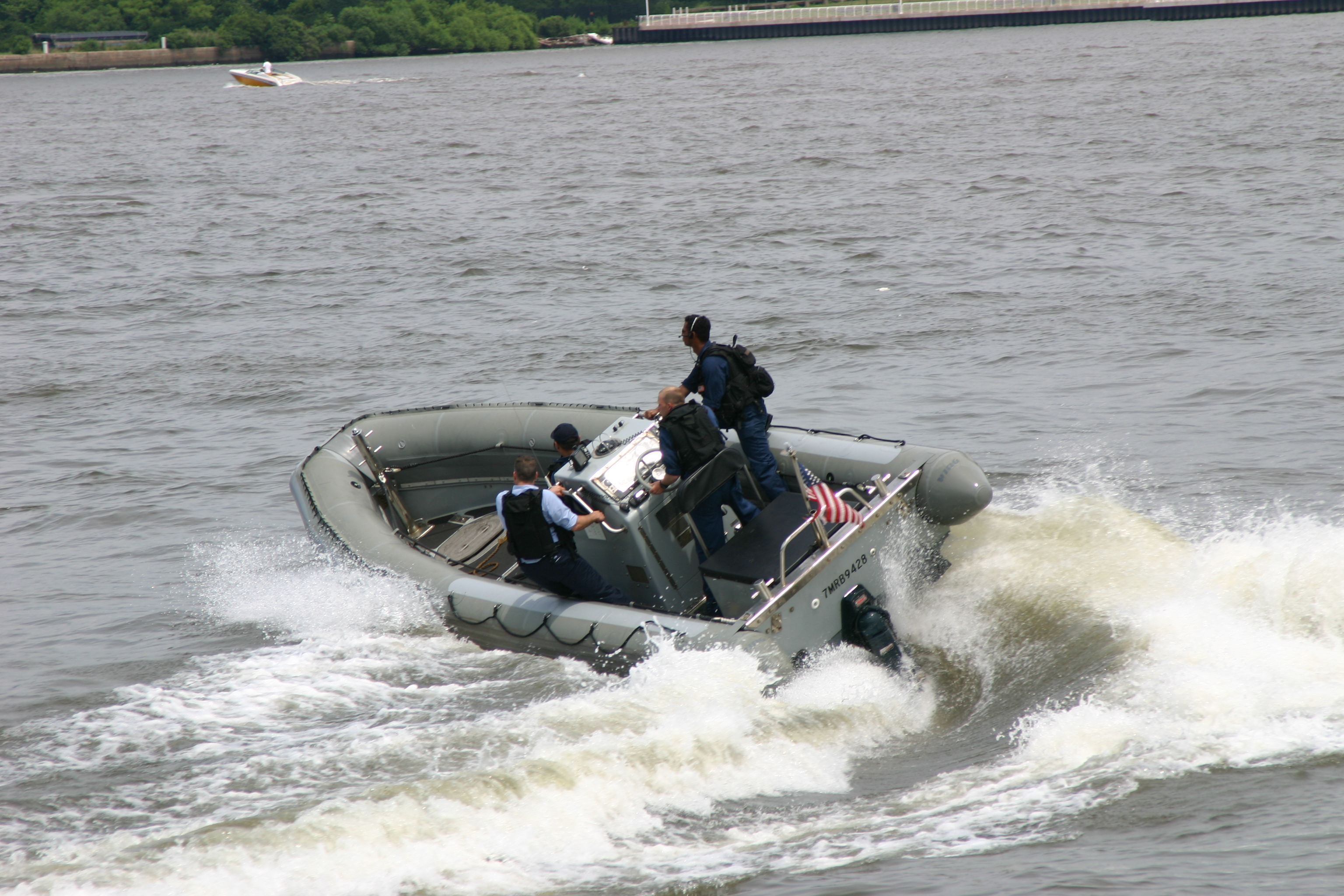
RHIB deployed from a US Navy destroyer operating in a littoral area

In military and naval warfare, littoral warfare is operations in and around the littoral zone, within a certain distance of shore, including surveillance, mine-clearing and support for landing operations and other types of combat shifting from water to ground, and back.

== Definition ==
Littoral warfare is warfare in and around the littoral zone.

== History ==
Littoral warfare has been conducted almost as long as human societies have been conducting warfare.

In the 21st century the United States Marine Corps re-emphasized littoral warfare.

== See also ==
- Amphibious warfare
- Littoral combat ship
