= Austal =

Australian defence company

Austal Limited
- Type: Public limited company
- Traded as: ASX: ASB
- ISIN: AU000000ASB3
- Industry: Shipbuilding and Defence
- Founded: 8 August 1988; 38 years ago in Perth, Western Australia
- Founder: John Rothwell
- Headquarters: Australian Marine Complex, Henderson, Western Australia
- Area served: Worldwide
- Key people: Richard V. Spencer (Non Executive Chairman); Patrick Gregg (CEO)
- Products: High-speed craft; Platform supply vessels; Warships
- Revenue: ▲ A$1.82 billion (2025)
- Number of employees: 4,479 (2025)
- Subsidiaries: Austal USA; Austal Philippines; Austal Vietnam
- Website: www.austal.com

Austal Limited is an Australian-based global ship building company and defence prime contractor that specialises in the design, construction and support of defence and commercial vessels. Austal's product range includes naval vessels, high-speed ferries, and supply or crew transfer vessels for offshore windfarms and oil and gas platforms.

Austal has three major ship building facilities. Defence vessels are designed and constructed in Henderson, Western Australia, and Mobile, Alabama, US. Commercial vessels are constructed in Balamban, Philippines. Vessel support is provided through service centres located in Darwin, Cairns and Henderson in Australia; San Diego, California, US; Balamban, Philippines and Muscat, Oman. Corporate headquarters are co-located at Austal's Australian ship building facility in Henderson.

As of early 2017, Austal has designed and constructed over 260 vessels for numerous defence forces and commercial fleet operators. Customers include the Australian Border Force, Condor Ferries, Mols Linien of Denmark, Royal Australian Navy, Royal Navy of Oman, and the United States Navy.

== History ==
Austal was founded in 1988 by John Rothwell. In December 1998, it was listed on the Australian Securities Exchange.

In May 1999, Oceanfast was purchased. In December 1999, Austal USA was formed in a joint venture with Bender Shipbuilding & Repair of Mobile, Alabama. In September 2006, it purchased Bender's shareholding in Austal USA.

In February 2007, North West Bay Shipping shipyard in Margate, Tasmania was purchased. It was closed in August 2010. In November 2011, a shipyard in Balamban, Philippines was purchased.

== Products ==
=== Littoral Combat Ship (LCS) ===
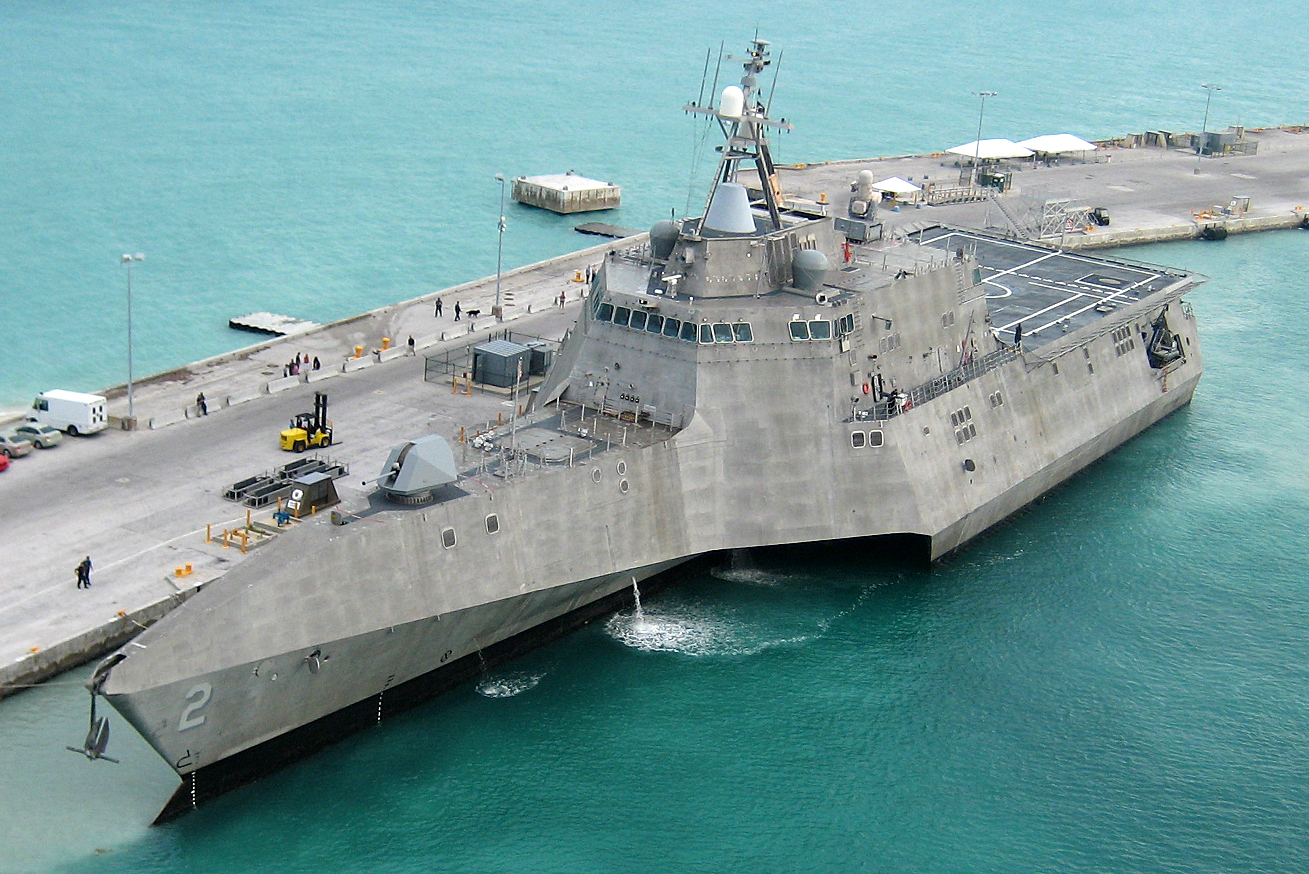
USS Independence (LCS-2) at Naval Air Station Key West

In October 2005, Austal / General Dynamics was awarded a contract to build the first unit from its design for a Littoral Combat Ship. The keel of USS Independence was laid down on 19 January 2006 at Austal USA's Mobile, Alabama shipyard, with the naming ceremony held in October 2008. It is now operating with the fleet at its current location in Norfolk, Virginia.

LCS-2 was the first ship built by Austal USA for the US Navy and the Navy's first trimaran Littoral Combat Ship. It is the first naval warship constructed in Mobile, Alabama since World War II. The basis of Austal's seaframe design was the 127-metre (417 ft) trimaran hull HSC Benchijigua Express.

The second Austal/General Dynamics ship, LCS-4, was cancelled in November 2007.

In May 2009, the US Navy renewed the contract with Austal/General Dynamics to build the second LCS, USS Coronado, with delivery scheduled for May 2012.

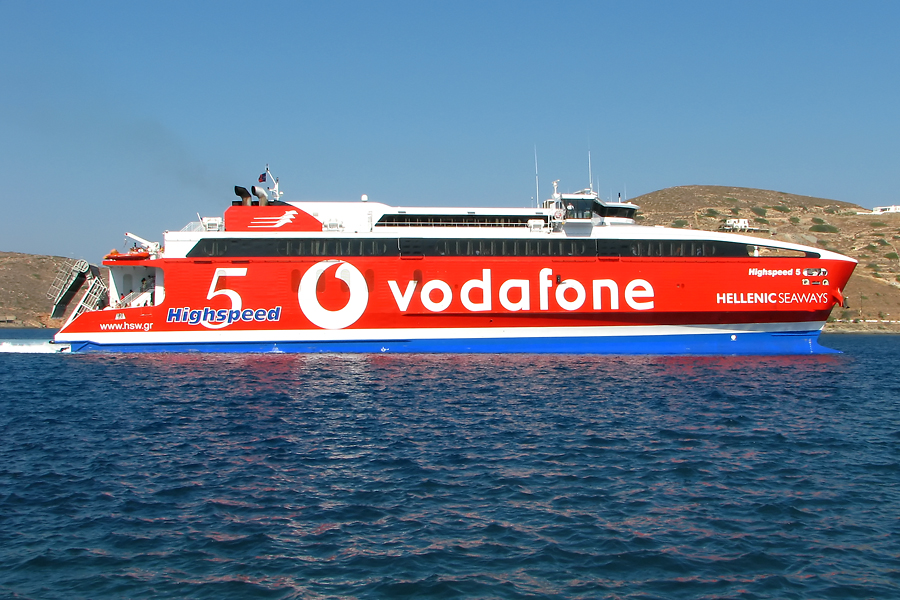
Highspeed 5 of Hellenic Seaways in the port of Ios

In December 2010 the US Navy announced a new contract with Austal USA after Austal severed ties with General Dynamics Bath Iron Works. New contracts for Littoral Combat Ships were awarded to both Austal USA and Lockheed Martin. The contract called for one ship to be built beginning in 2010 (USS Jackson), one to be built in 2011 (USS Montgomery), and two per year from 2012 to 2015. The LCS-6 contract was for US$432 million, with a goal of having the average ship cost US$352 million each. Another US$20 million was figured in for change orders, and a management reserve.

=== Expeditionary Fast Transport (EPF) ===
In November 2008, Austal was awarded a contract to design and build the US military's next-generation, high-speed catamaran, the Spearhead-class Expeditionary Fast Transport (EPF), which was formerly called the Joint High Speed Vessel (JHSV). The contract was part of a larger programme potentially worth over US$1.6 billion.

As the prime contractor, Austal was to design and construct the first 103-metre (338 ft) EPF, with options for nine additional vessels expected to be exercised between 2009 and 2013. Construction on the second ship started in September 2010. By the end of 2010, Austal had contracts for three ships, long-lead material contracts for two ships and options for five further ships, for a total of ten.

The EPF is similar to the Austal-built MV Westpac Express, which the US Marines had used since 2002.

The EPF can carry 635 tonnes (700 short tons), 1,200 nautical miles (2,200 km; 1,400 mi) at an average speed of 35 knots (65 km/h; 40 mph) and is able to unload at roll-on/roll-off discharge facilities. The vessels are 103 m (338 ft) long, have a 28.5 m (94 ft) beam with a crew of 22 to 40.

The first four vessels were named USNS Spearhead, USNS Choctaw County, USNS Millinocket and USNS Fall River.

While the EPF can carry 300 Marines and their gear for up to four days, it is not expected to be survivable against enemy attack.

In 2011, US Navy planners envisioned building up to two dozen of the EPF ships into the 2020s.

=== Cape-class patrol boats ===
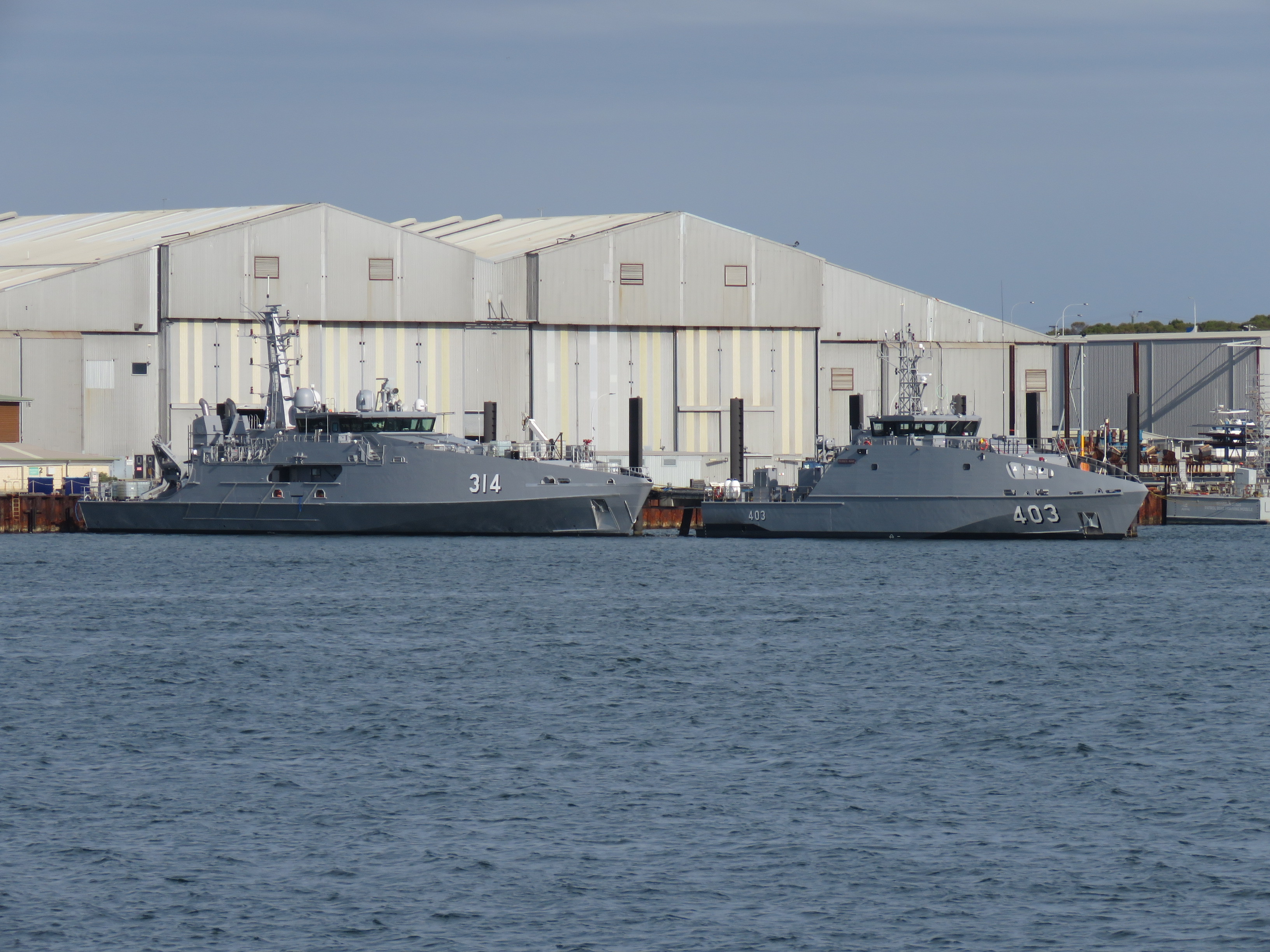
Comparison of a Cape-class (left) and a Guardian-class patrol boat (right), both built at Austal shipyards in Henderson, Western Australia

In August 2011, Austal was awarded the contract for the design, construction and through-life support of the Cape-class patrol boats for the Australian Customs and Border Protection Service. The eight, 58-metre (190 ft) aluminium monohulls were delivered between March 2013 and August 2015.

In December 2015, Austal entered into a shipbuilding contract with the National Australia Bank to construct two further Cape-class patrol boats. The contract value is A$63 million. The two vessels will be delivered to the National Australia Bank in mid-2017 and chartered to the Australian Government for a minimum term of three years. Austal did a similar off-balance-sheet charter with Westpac Express, which was chartered to the US Navy for 13 years.

In July 2018, the government of Trinidad and Tobago announced the acquisition of two Cape-class patrol boats. The vessels will enhance the border protection capabilities of the country in conjunction with the existing Coast Guard fleet, and will join six Austal Fast Patrol Craft acquired in 2009.

In May 2020, six Evolved Cape-class patrol boats were ordered for the Royal Australian Navy. In 2022, a second order for an additional two vessels was made, and in 2023 a third order for a further two boats.

=== Armidale-class patrol boats ===
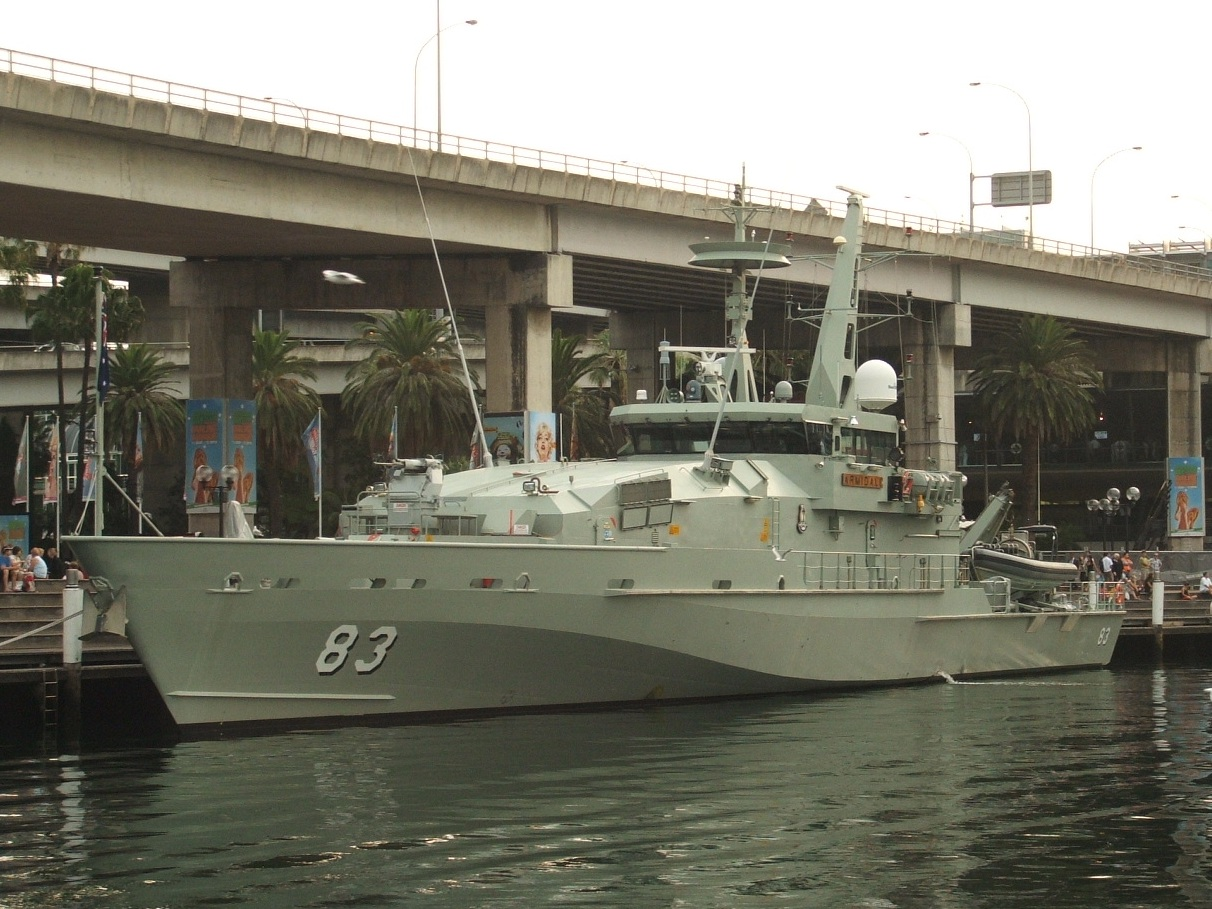
HMAS Armidale at Darling Harbour

Between June 2005 and February 2008, Austal delivered fourteen, 56.8 m (186 ft) Armidale-class patrol boats to the Royal Australian Navy for coastal defence. The boats were featured on the TV series Sea Patrol.

=== P21-class patrol boats ===
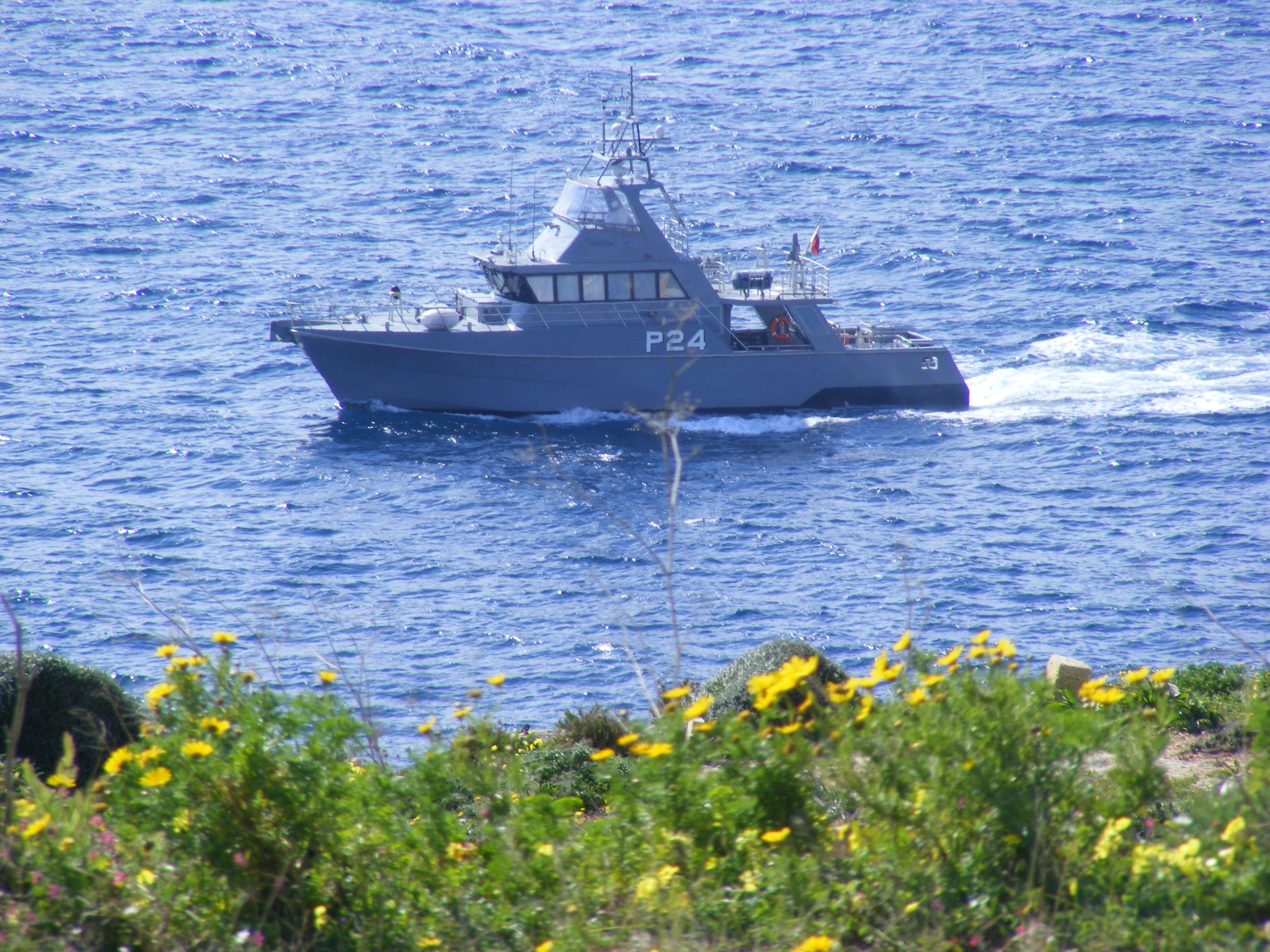
Maltese patrol boat P24

In 2009, the Maritime Squadron of the Armed Forces of Malta ordered four patrol boats from Austal. They were due to replace the Swift-class patrol boats P23 and P24 which had been in commission since 1971 and the Bremse-class patrol boat P32 which had been in commission since 1992. The new vessels were built to Maltese specifications and were partly financed by the European Union.

The first two vessels were launched in October 2009. All four vessels were delivered to Malta in late 2009, and commissioned in March 2010.

=== Yemeni Navy patrol boats ===
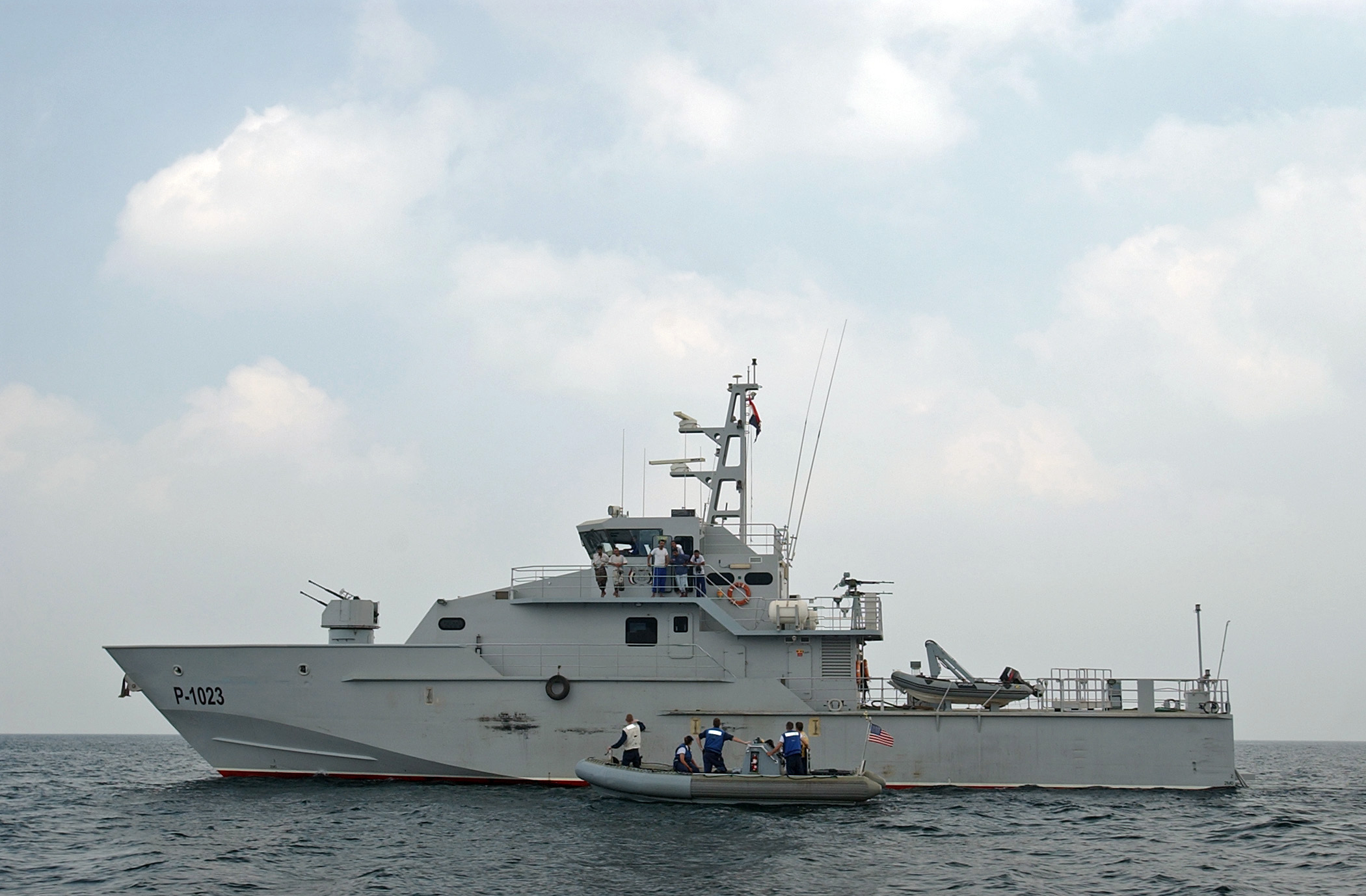
Yemeni Navy patrol boat

In 2005, Austal delivered ten high-speed patrol boats to the Yemeni Navy, which are commercially hired out to protect private shippers.

=== Omani Navy High Speed Support Vessels (HSSV) ===
In early 2014, Austal announced it had been awarded a US$124.9 million contract for two High Speed Support Vessels (HSSV) for the Royal Navy of Oman. Both were delivered to the Omani Navy by late 2016. The HSSV has a catamaran hull design similar to the US Navy's Expeditionary Fast Transport (EPF).

=== Commercial and leisure vessels ===
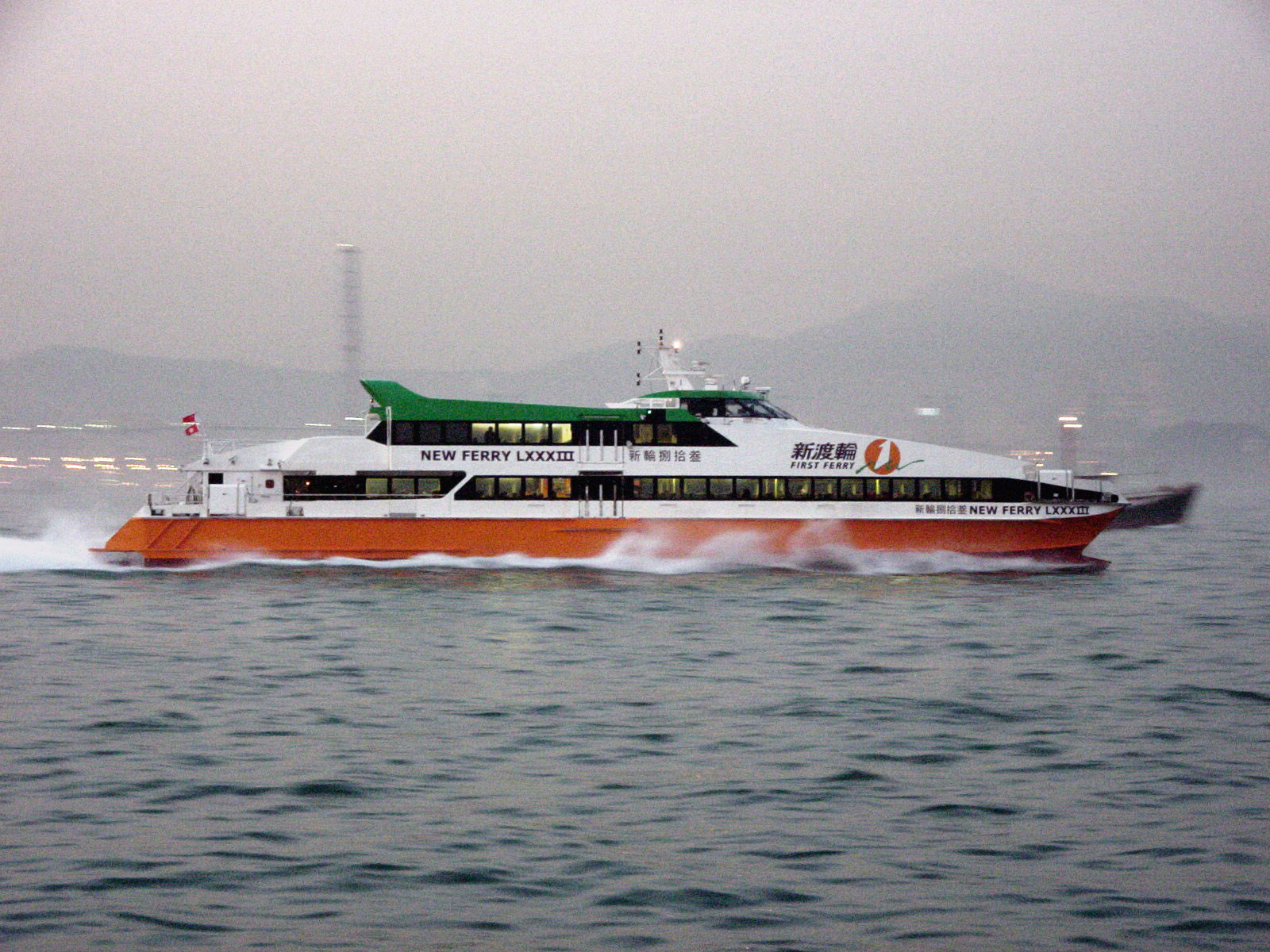
An Austal 48 for New World First Ferry in Hong Kong and Macau

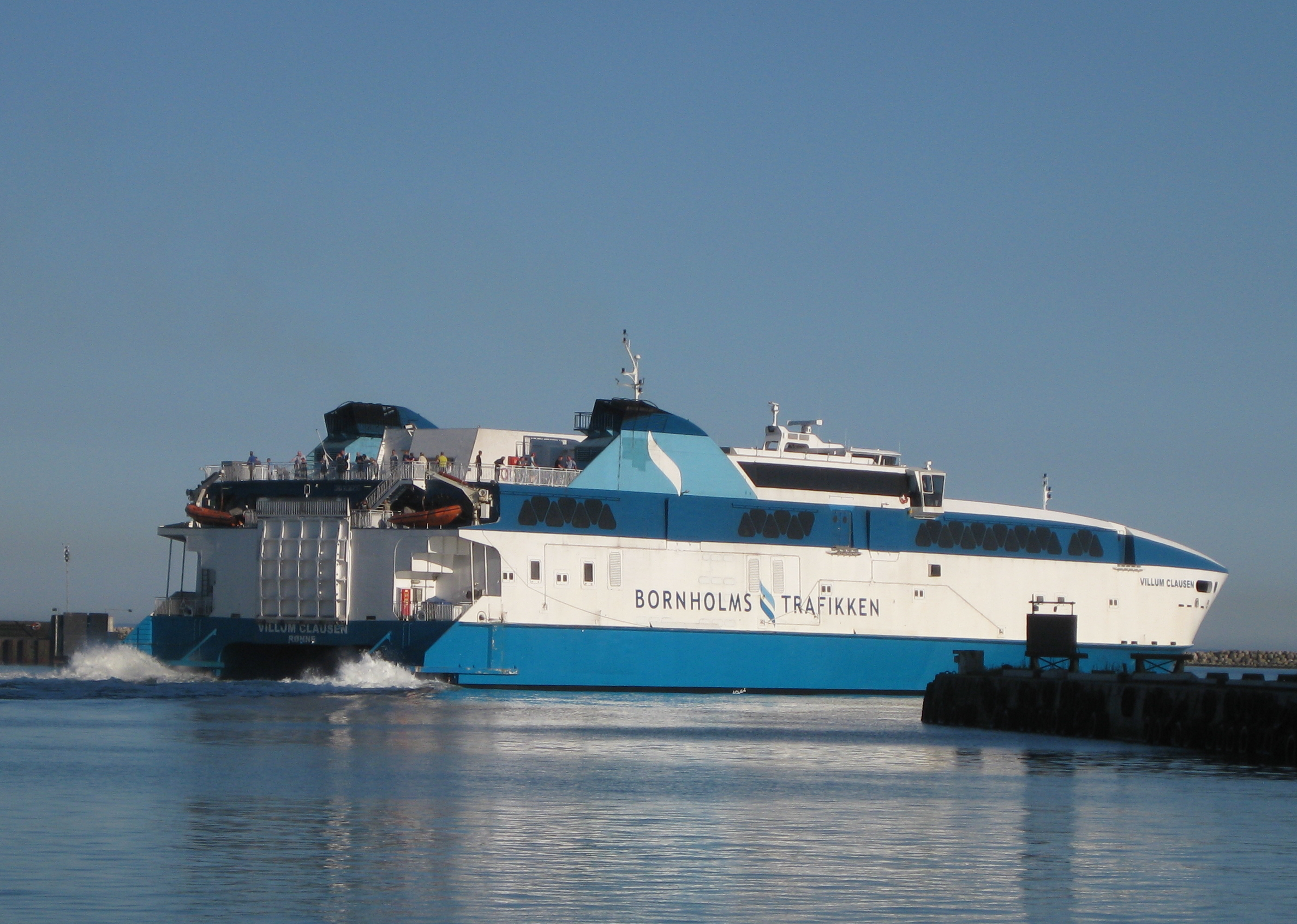
MS Villum Clausen was built and delivered in 2000 to Bornholmstrafikken on the Danish island of Bornholm.

Austal is one of only two companies building fast multi-hull ferries between 60 and 120 m (200 and 390 ft) long. In the early 1990s, the ferry industry was transformed with the introduction of large, high-speed catamarans with decks for vehicles. They quickly replaced most hydrofoil and hovercraft services as well as many monohull ferries. The popularity of the new type of multi-hull design led to many shipyards worldwide changing their production to build fast aluminium catamarans.

Eventually capacity exceeded demand and by the end of the 20th century most builders of large fast cats had ceased production. Austal and its only competitor in this category, Hobart-based Incat survived the late 1990s industry collapse. The two companies continue to compete for orders of large multi-hull ferries of up to 11,000 gross tons with capacities of over 1,200 passengers and 400 vehicles.

On 20 August 2014, Austal announced the sale of Austal Hull 270, the company's 102-metre (335 ft) trimaran stock vessel, to the UK Channel Islands' ferry operator, Condor Ferries, for A$61.5 million. It was renamed HSC Condor Liberation. Modifications to the stock vessel were valued at approximately A$6 million, and was scheduled to enter service in Spring 2015. On 28 March 2015, the ship struck the quayside while attempting to dock in Guernsey on its second day in service. The damage was only minor and above the waterline. Since then, Condor Liberation has had a difficult period of operation with Condor Ferries, encountering numerous technical problems, weather cancellations and sustaining further damage to its hull whilst docked in Poole on 30 December 2015.

=== Landing craft ===
In November 2023, defence companies Austal and Birdon announced that they would be building landing craft. They would be built at the Henderson Shipyard in WA.

== See also ==
- Alakai & Huakai (Former Hawaii Superferry vessels, sold to the US Navy)
- Cotai Jet
- TurboJET
- Chu Kong Passenger Transport
- Austal 118 metre trimaran
- Pacific-class patrol boat
