= USNS Guam =

United States Navy high-speed transport vessel

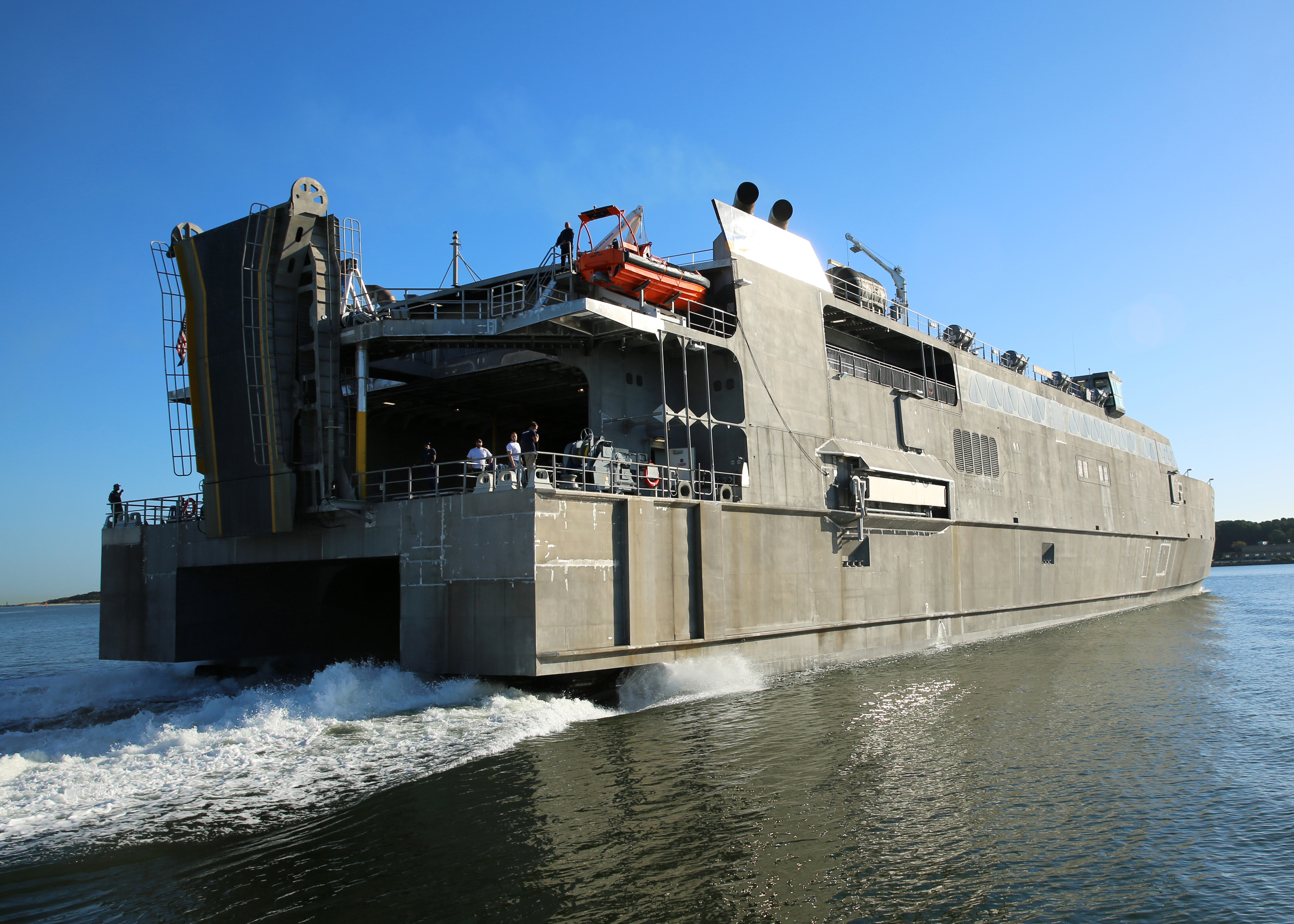

History

United States
- Name: Huakai
- Owner: Hawaii Superferry (2007-2009); U.S. Maritime Administration (2009-2012)
- Operator: Hawaii Superferry (2007-2009); U.S. Maritime Administration (2009-2012)
- Port of registry: Honolulu, Hawaii, U.S.
- Builder: Austal USA
- Cost: US$88M
- Yard number: 616
- Launched: September 29, 2008
- Completed: September 2008
- Fate: Transferred to United States Navy in 2012
- Notes: Never entered commercial service

United States
- Name: USNS Guam
- Owner: United States Navy
- Operator: United States Navy
- Christened: 27 April 2019
- Identification: IMO number: 9328924; MMSI number: 369466000; Callsign: NGUM

General characteristics
- Type: Ferry
- Displacement: 1,646 tons
- Length: 373 ft (114 m)
- Beam: 78 ft (24 m)
- Draft: 14 ft (4.3 m)
- Decks: 4
- Deck clearance: 14 ft (4.3 m)
- Installed power: 4 x MTU 20V 8000 M70
- Propulsion: 4 x Rolls-Royce KaMeWa 125MkII waterjets
- Speed: 35 knots (65 km/h; 40 mph)
- Capacity: 866 passengers, 282 cars
- Crew: 21

USNS Guam (T-HST-1), formerly Hawaii Superferry's Huakai, is a United States Navy high-speed transport vessel. The ship was completed in September 2008 and was intended to start Hawaiian service in May 2009, though delivery postponements saw that planned service canceled. In the Hawaiian language, huakaʻi means "journey".

The design of the Spearhead-class expeditionary fast transport is 70 percent in common with the Hawaii Superferries, both built by Austal USA.

== Vessel ==
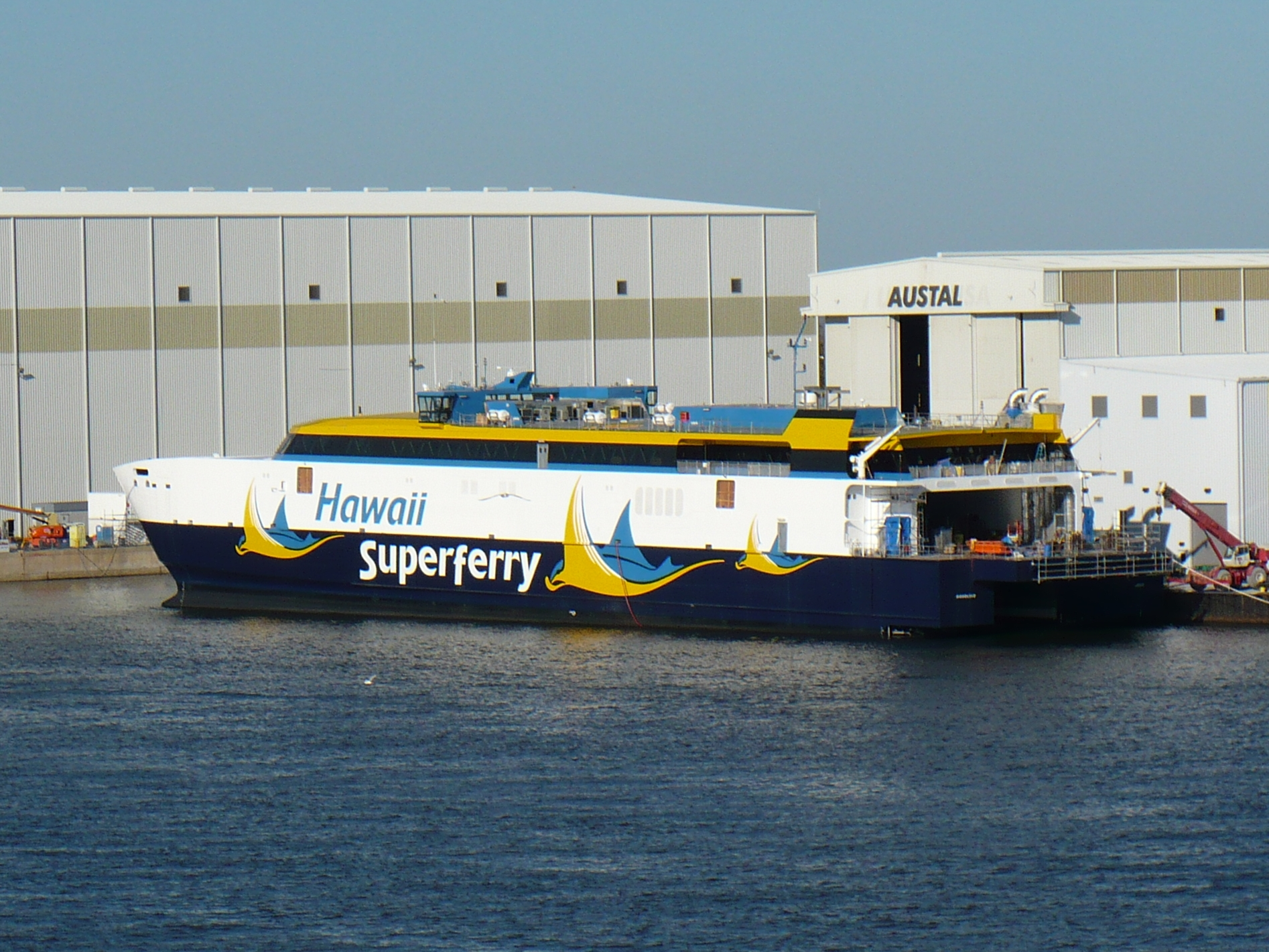
Guam in original Hawaii Superferry livery as Huakai

USNS Guam was built as Huakai, whose name is based on the Hawaiian language word huakaʻi, which means "journey". The vessel is a 373-foot (114 m) long high-speed roll-on/roll-off (Ro/Ro) passenger ship. The vessel was originally built for Hawaii Superferry, and has a capacity of 866 passengers and up to 282 subcompact cars. It is 19 feet (5.8 m) longer than its sister ship, USNS Puerto Rico, due to a bi-fold ramp installed on the stern of the ship.

The vessel featured environmentally friendly technologies including non-toxic bottom paint, zero wastewater discharge and clean diesel engines.

Austal USA, a subsidiary of Austal, an Australian company that is the world's largest builder of fast ferries, built Huakai. Construction on Huakai began in 2007 in Mobile, Alabama. The ship was intended to enter service in 2009, but due to the abrupt shut down of Hawaii Superferry, the ship was laid up. Alakai also returned to the Alabama ship yard. On July 2, 2009, Hawaii Superferry decided to abandon Huakai and Alakai.

== Service history ==
In January 2010, the United States Maritime Administration announced that Huakai and Alakai would be used to assist with relief in the 2010 Haiti earthquake.

On September 13, 2010, Huakai and Alakai were auctioned off, for $25 million each, by the U.S. District Court for the Eastern District of Virginia. They were purchased by the U.S. Department of Transportation's Maritime Administration.

On January 27, 2012, the U.S. Department of Transportation’s Maritime Administration transferred two high speed vessels, Huakai and Alakai, to the U.S. Navy under the Defense Authorization Act of 2012. The Navy had planned to use the vessels to transport troops and equipment to training areas from Okinawa and other locations, helping the Navy meet these unique operational requirements without the need to build new vessels.

In May 2012, the Navy has announced that both Alakai and Huakai have been renamed. Alakai was renamed USNS Puerto Rico and Huakai became Guam. Guam was modified to replace the chartered Westpac Express in Okinawa in March 2013, and Puerto Rico remained laid up until 2016.
