= Dublin Swift =

Dublin Swift may refer to

- HSC Dublin Swift - A High Speed Craft operated by Irish Ferries since 2018
- HSC Cecilia Payne - A High Speed Craft, formerly known as the Jonathan Swift
