= HST-2 =

Ferry built in 2007

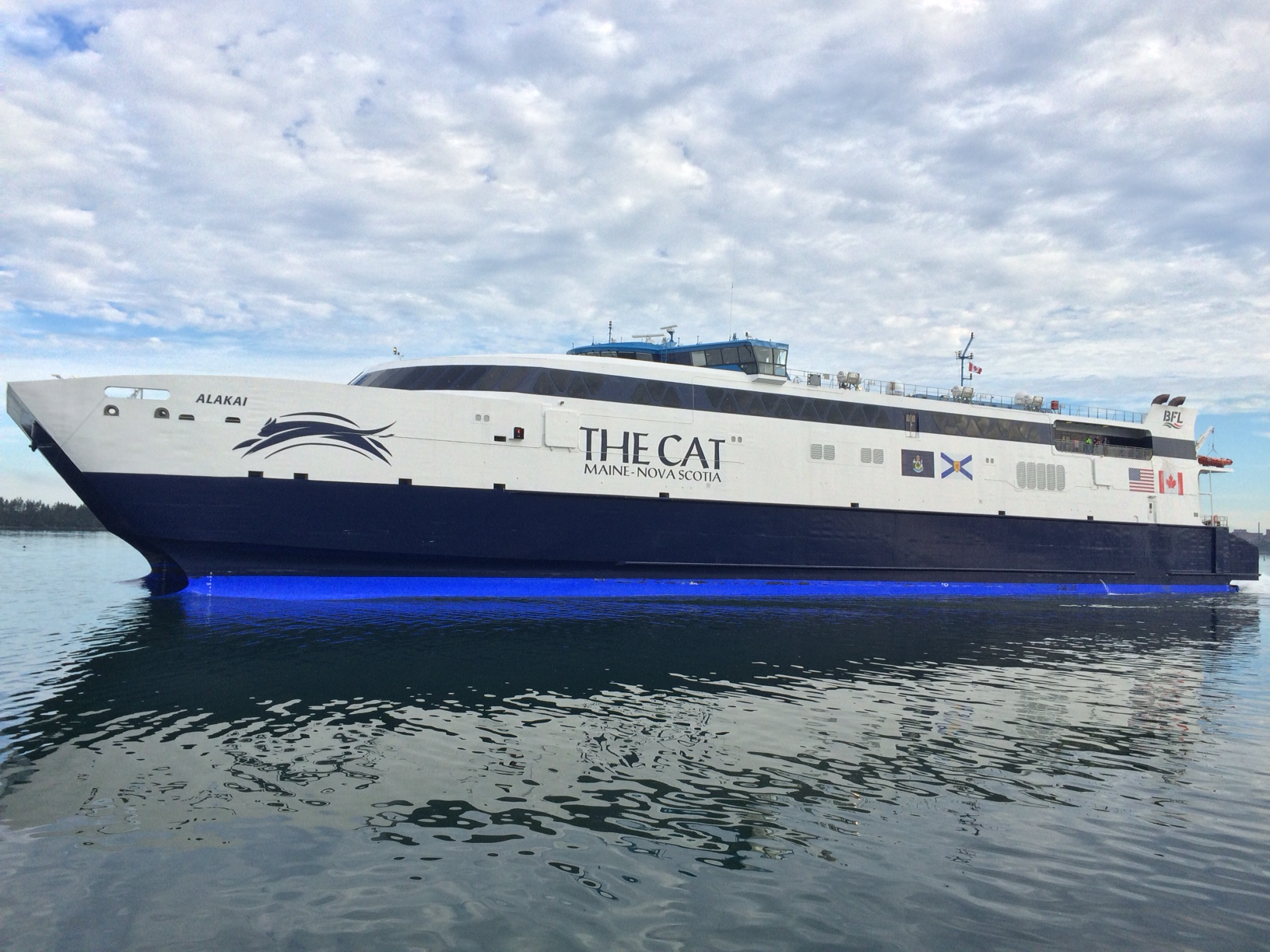
- HST-2 leaving Yarmouth Harbour

History

United States
- Name: Alakai
- Owner: Hawaii Superferry (2007-2009); U.S. Maritime Administration (2009-2012); United States Navy Military Sealift Command (2012-present)
- Operator: Hawaii Superferry (2007-2009); U.S. Maritime Administration (2009-2012); United States Navy Military Sealift Command (2012-2016); Bay Ferries Limited (2016-present)
- Port of registry: Honolulu, Hawaii, U.S. (2007-2009); Norfolk, Virginia, U.S. (present)
- Builder: Austal USA
- Cost: US$88M
- Yard number: 615
- Way number: 1
- Laid down: June 3, 2004
- Launched: January 18, 2007
- Christened: April 14, 2007
- Maiden voyage: August, 2007
- In service: 2007
- Identification: IMO number: 9328912; MMSI number: 369070000; Callsign: WDD4575
- Status: In service

General characteristics
- Type: Ferry
- Tonnage: 8,127 GT
- Displacement: 1,646 tons
- Length: 349 ft (106 m)
- Beam: 78 ft (24 m)
- Draft: 12 ft (3.7 m)
- Decks: 4
- Deck clearance: 14 ft (4.3 m)
- Installed power: 4 x MTU-8000 diesel engines
- Propulsion: 4 x Rolls-Royce KaMeWa 125MkII waterjets
- Speed: 35 knots (65 km/h; 40 mph), max 43 knots (80 km/h; 49 mph)
- Capacity: 866 passengers, 282 cars
- Crew: 21

HST-2, formerly named USNS Puerto Rico and Alakai, is a vessel owned by the United States Navy Military Sealift Command. She was originally Hawaii Superferry's first high-speed ferry. The vessel was later chartered by Bay Ferries Limited to operate a ferry service between Maine and Yarmouth, Nova Scotia.

The design of the Spearhead-class expeditionary fast transport is similar to the two high-speed ferries operated by Hawaii Superferry, both built by Austal USA.

== Vessel ==
HST-2 was built as Alakai, which means "sea path" in the Hawaiian language. The vessel is a 349-foot (106 m) long high-speed roll-on/roll-off (Ro/Ro) passenger and vehicle ferry. She used to operate a daily service operated by Hawaii Superferry at a speed of 35 knots (65 km/h; 40 mph) between the islands of Oahu and Maui. HST-2 has a capacity of 866 passengers and up to 282 subcompact cars. Alternately, its vehicle decks can be reconfigured in five minutes to carry up to 20 large trucks and 90 cars.

Like her sister ship USNS Guam (formerly Huakai), the vessel features environmentally friendly technologies including non-toxic bottom paint, zero wastewater discharge and clean diesel engines.

Hawaii Superferry's vessels were designed and built by Austal USA, a subsidiary of Austal, an Australian company that is the world's largest builder of fast ferries. Construction on HST-2 began in June 2004 in Mobile, Alabama. The ship was launched in January 2007, christened in April 2007 and sea trials went smoothly.

== Starting service ==
The vessel arrived as Alakai in Honolulu, Hawaii, on June 30, 2007, with a celebration, after a smooth 17-day delivery voyage. The ship's maiden voyage was on August 26, 2007, and the trip to Maui was smooth. The voyage to Kauai was rougher and Alakai was met by about a dozen protestors on surfboards blockading the entrance to Nawiliwili Harbor. The protestors were peacefully cleared by the United States Coast Guard.

== 2008 dry dock ==
On February 13, 2008, Alakai went into dry dock to make repairs to her auxiliary rudders that were damaged in late January. The dry docking was extended due to hull damage caused when a tugboat moving Alakai into dry dock lost power and collided heavily with the catamaran. Alakai returned to service in early April 2008 shortly after Aloha Airlines ended service. Before resuming service the ship went through sea trials and was re-certified by the Coast Guard.

== 2009 shut down ==
On March 17, 2009, after about 11 months in service, the Hawaii Supreme Court ruled that the legislation permitting Alakai to operate without an environmental review was unconstitutional. Hawaii Superferry made one last round trip to allow an orderly return of passengers who were not on their home island. They canceled existing reservations and did not take new reservations. The Superferry company intended to look for other work for Alakai; it had also left open the possibility of bringing the ferry back into service if and when Hawaii completed an environmental review, but the company decided to abandon the vessel ending all possibilities of returning to Hawaii.

In January 2010, the United States Maritime Administration announced that Huakai and Alakai would be used to assist with relief in the 2010 Haiti earthquake.

== Navy acquisition and name change ==
On September 13, 2010, Huakai and Alakai were auctioned off, for $25 million each, by the U.S. District Court for the Eastern District of Virginia. They were purchased by the U.S. Department of Transportation's Maritime Administration.

On January 27, 2012, the U.S. Department of Transportation's Maritime Administration transferred two high speed vessels, Huakai and Alakai, to the U.S. Navy under the Defense Authorization Act of 2012. The Navy had planned to use the vessels to transport troops and equipment to training areas from Okinawa and other locations, helping the Navy meet the unique operational requirements without the need to build new vessels.

In May 2012, the Navy announced that both Alakai and Huakai had been renamed. Alakai was to be named USNS Puerto Rico and Huakai was to be named USNS Guam. Guam was modified to replace the chartered Westpac Express in Okinawa in March 2013, and Puerto Rico remained laid up until 2016.

On August 19, 2012, HST-2 (then USNS Puerto Rico) was towed from Norfolk, Virginia, to Philadelphia, to keep it safe from hurricanes while future uses for the vessel were being evaluated. On February 5, 2016, the U.S. Secretary of the Navy removed the name Puerto Rico from the vessel. The name Puerto Rico was subsequently reassigned to USNS Puerto Rico (T-EPF-11) on December 14, 2016.

Austal USA shifted its entire effort after 2009 to U.S. Navy construction of the similar Joint High Speed Vessels (JHSVs) and 12 Littoral Combat Ships (LCSs) with the experience building the high speed ferries as a feature in winning those contracts.

== Gulf of Maine ferry service ==
On March 24, 2016, Bay Ferries Limited announced that it had reached an agreement with the U.S. Maritime Administration and the U.S. Navy for a multi-year charter of HST-2. The vessel would be operated for a passenger/vehicle ferry service in the Gulf of Maine between Portland, Maine, and Yarmouth, Nova Scotia, and retain the name HST-2, but the service and vessel would be branded as The CAT to align with previous branding used when Bay Ferries operated a high-speed passenger/vehicle ferry on the same route six years prior. The vessel underwent a refit at the Detyens Shipyard in South Carolina and the service started on June 15, 2016.

At the end of the 2018 season, it was announced that the ferry would be departing from the town of Bar Harbor, rather than Portland. Service along this new route was originally expected to begin in summer 2019, but was delayed due to construction work at the Bar Harbor marina. Service was then canceled during both the 2020 and 2021 seasons due to the COVID-19 pandemic. After three years out of port, The CAT returned to sail from Yarmouth on May 19, 2022, providing service to Bar Harbor for the first time in 13 years.
