= Hawaii Superferry =

American transportation company

- Hawaii Superferry logo
- Industry: Ferry
- Founded: 2003; 23 years ago
- Defunct: 2009; 17 years ago
- Headquarters: Honolulu, Hawaii, United States
- Area served: Oahu, Maui
- Website: HawaiiSuperFerry.com

Hawaii Superferry was a Hawaii-based transportation company that provided passenger and vehicle transportation between Honolulu Harbor on the island of Oʻahu and Kahului Harbor on Maui. Legal issues over environmental impact statements and protests from residents of Maui and Kauaʻi temporarily delayed the implementation of service, but service between Oʻahu and Maui began in December 2007. The company had hoped to return service to Nawiliwili Harbor on Kauaʻi and additionally planned to eventually provide service to Kawaihae Harbor on the Big Island.

Ferry operations were suspended in March 2009 after the Hawaii Supreme Court ruled that a state law allowing the Superferry to operate without a second complete environmental impact statement was unconstitutional. The company went bankrupt as a result of these actions preventing service in Hawaii. On July 2, 2009, a Delaware Bankruptcy Court granted the company's motion to abandon both the ships Alakai and Huakai, ending all possibilities that the company might return to Hawaii; the ships were bought by the US Maritime Administration in 2010. The United States Navy eventually purchased the craft for a total of $35M, a small fraction of their original $180M cost.

== Vessels ==
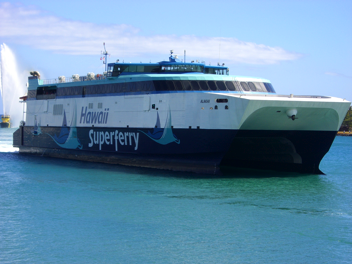
Alakai docking in Honolulu Harbor

The vessel used by Hawaii Superferry was an aluminum-hulled catamaran with drive-on / drive-off vehicle capability or fast ferry service. It was designed and built in the United States, in Mobile, AL by Austal USA, a division of the world's largest fast-ferry builder, Australia-based shipbuilder Austal. The vessel is powered by MTU Friedrichshafen engines running on ultra-low sulfur diesel using waterjet propulsion which the company claimed will minimize impact to marine mammals. It was capable of transporting up to 866 passengers and 282 subcompact cars.

The first ship, Alakai, arrived in Honolulu Harbor on June 30, 2007. The second ship, Huakai, was scheduled for completion in 2009, but due to state court ruling halting service, Huakai was abandoned along with Alakai.

== History ==
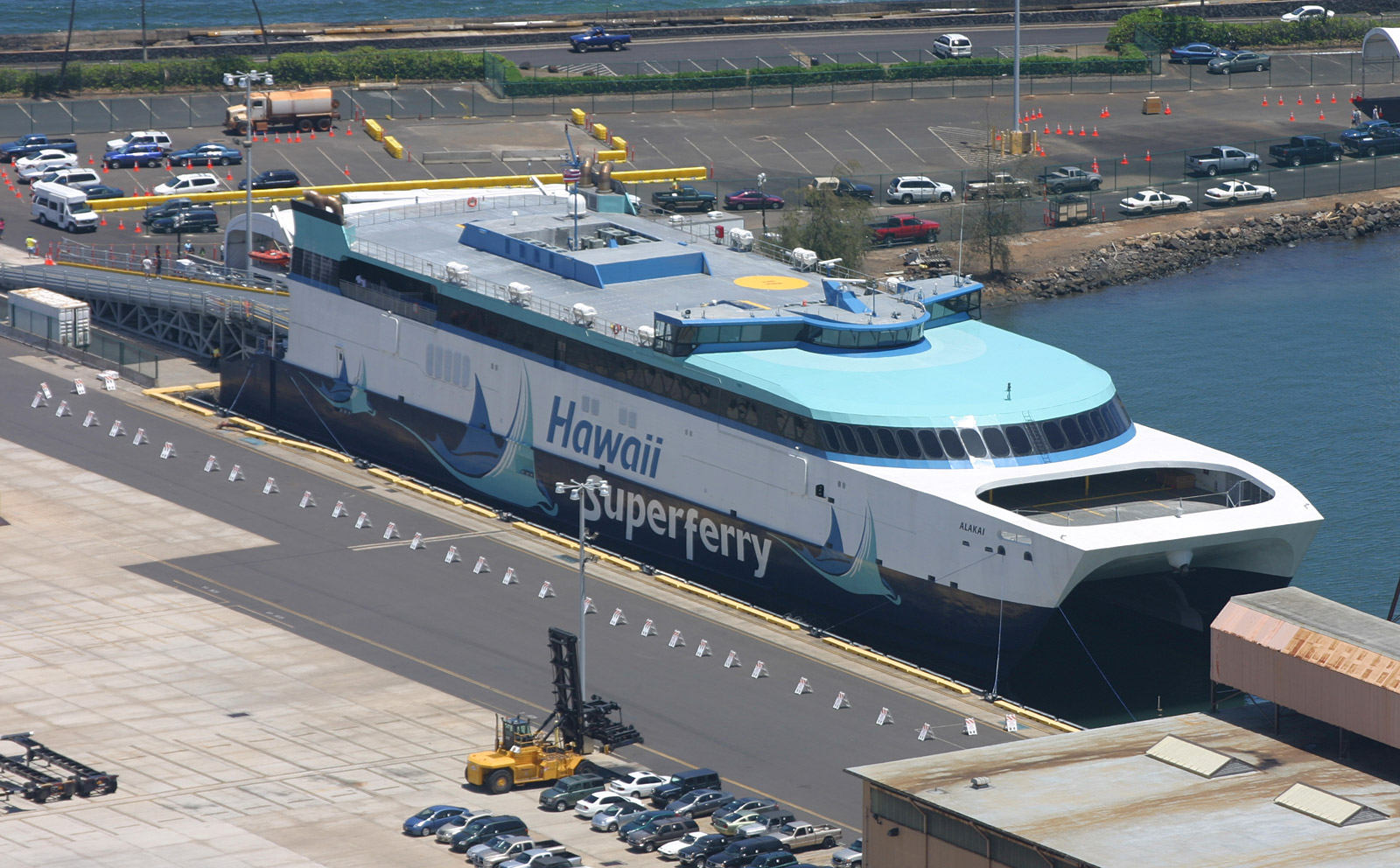
An aerial view of Alakai at Nawiliwili Harbor on Kauaʻi during her Open House on August 19, 2007

Private steamships and ferries were the only way of traveling between the islands from the 19th century until the 1950s and they have returned twice since statehood. The first attempt to re-establish service was the vehicle ferries in 1959-1960s between Oahu, Maui and Big Island—aboard which surfer Eddie Aikau moved with his family from Maui to Oahu. The second attempt was made by Seaflite, which operated fast 50 knot hydrofoils between the major islands in the mid-1970s. There is currently only one passenger ferry service remaining in Hawaii, from the island of Maui (Lahaina) and Lanai (Manele). The route is operated daily by Expeditions, a company based in Lahaina.

The concept of the Superferry was founded in 2001 and first announced by founders Timothy Dick, John Garibaldi, and Robert "Terry" White in September 2003 after more than two years of planning. Hawaii Superferry stated its plans to operate a daily service between the newly built interisland ferry terminal at Pier 19 in Honolulu Harbor to Kahului on Maui and Nawiliwili on Kauai, with later expansion of service to Kawaihae near Kona on the Big Island. The company claimed fares for a family trip to be similar to the equivalent airfare, car rental, and parking.

In January 2004, the company formed a partnership with Austal to build two high-speed catamarans. Construction on the first ship began in June 2004. Meanwhile, the company secured its first investors, including Maui Land & Pineapple Company, Grove Farm on Kauaʻi, and a MARAD loan guarantee of $140 million

=== Inaugural voyage ===
The Hawaii Supreme Court ruled on August 23, 2007, that the state Department of Transportation had erred in not requiring a second environmental impact assessment for harbor improvements at Kahului Harbor, reversing an earlier ruling in 2005 by Maui Circuit Court Judge Joseph Cardoza. Superferry then announced that it would accelerate its launch to August 26, 2007, two days earlier than its originally scheduled launch date.

Service began with inaugural $5 fares. The inaugural voyages were sold out. The voyage to Maui was smooth and uneventful with a few environmental protesters observing peacefully at Kahului Harbor. However, about a dozen protesters on surfboards blockaded the ferry at Nawiliwili Harbor on Kauaʻi. The Coast Guard cleared the ferry's path after 90 minutes. Upon docking, protesters vandalized cars and confronted passengers, including Kauaʻi residents. Several protesters were arrested.

=== Suspension of service ===
On August 27, 2007, Judge Cardoza issued a temporary restraining order barring the Superferry from accessing Kahului Harbor, causing Maui service to be suspended. Meanwhile, the Superferry was forced to turn back from its second trip to Kauaʻi after protestors again blockaded the Nawiliwili Harbor resulting in several more arrests. Superferry passengers were forced to remain on board for 9 hours, while Kauaʻi residents were denied the ability to board the ferry. The company subsequently suspended services to Kauaʻi.

The protesters' concerns were that a ferry of this size traveling at speeds of about 40 mph (64 km/h) could strike and kill whales during its voyages despite this never occurring during the years the faster (50 mph) Seaflite interisland ferries operated. Other concerns included the potential to import invasive species between islands, and the potential to bring drugs and homeless people to Kauaʻi although it is unclear whether such risk was any different from the interisland airlines.

In a meeting with State Senate President Colleen Hanabusa on September 14, 2007, the company stated that it may have to find another home for the ferry in order to pay operating expenses, repay debt, and provide return on the investments made. Describing their meeting, Hanabusa commented that they would have staying power for "a month—outside, a month and a half." Superferry officials, while declining to elaborate, did not dispute this.

On October 9, 2007, Maui Judge Joseph Cardoza ruled the ferry could not resume service while the state conducts an environmental impact assessment. Two days later Superferry CEO John Garibaldi announced that the company would lay off 249 employees. Fifty-nine workers remained on the job to handle administrative and operational duties. The maritime community was disturbed by the loss of jobs for U.S. mariners.

=== Special legislative session ===
In mid October 2007, Governor Linda Lingle met with the leaders of the Hawaii State Legislature to propose a special legislative session to allow the ferry to operate while the state completed an environmental impact assessment. Senate and House leaders agreed. Governor Lingle called the Legislature into special session on October 24, 2007. In preparation for the session, legislators made trips to Kauaʻi, Maui, and The Big Island to get reactions. On Kauaʻi, the meeting was calm, but on Maui the meeting was more emotionally charged.

On Monday October 29, 2007 the State Senate approved a bill to allow "large capacity ferry vessels" to operate between ports in the Hawaiian Islands while an environmental statement is prepared.

The House passed the bill on October 31 on a vote of 39–11. Governor Lingle signed the bill into law on November 2, 2007.

=== Restarting service ===
On Wednesday November 14, 2007, Maui Court Judge Cardoza lifted the injunction banning the ferry from sailing to Kahului Harbor consistent with the new law. Hawaii Superferry's CEO John Garibaldi released this statement: "On behalf of Hawaii Superferry's family of employees, we are pleased with the judge's decision today. We are grateful for the support shown by the governor, legislature, and residents of Hawaii and look forward to commencing service soon." Superferry restarted daily round trip service to Maui on December 14.

=== Re-suspension of service ===
In December 2008, environmental groups and the company returned to court for an appeal of the previous ruling. On March 16, 2009, the Hawaii Supreme Court ruled that allowing the Superferry to operate prior to completion of the environmental study was unconstitutional. The company immediately suspended service and laid off its 236 employees.

=== Bankruptcy ===
On May 30, 2009, two months after suspending service, Hawaii Superferry filed for Chapter 11 Bankruptcy protection. The company would then abandon the vessels ending all possibilities to return service.

=== Revival attempts ===
On February 8, 2010, state lawmakers announced the introduction of a bill that would buy or lease both Alakai and Huakai and possibly start a state-run ferry service; the bill was killed two months later. The revival resurfaced in July 2010 when former Honolulu Mayor Mufi Hannemann introduced a "10-point action plan to boost the state's economy if he is elected governor." Hannemann said he was in talks with a group of investors interested in buying both Alakai and Huakai.

On March 21, 2011, the Hawaii State senate committee approved a planned proposal to establish a state-run ferry authority with the power to borrow money and purchase a high-speed ferry for interisland service. House Bill 1239, introduced by state Rep. Joe Souki of Maui, would set up the Hawaii State Ferry System and a special fund for its operation. However, there were mixed reaction as to how it will be structured and to how it will be run.

On February 4, 2016, the Honolulu Advertiser reported that lawmakers have directed the Department of Transportation to conduct a feasibility study to establish a ferry system. The resulting report – published on December 28, 2017 – found that the idea was unfeasible.

== See also ==
- USNS Guam (HST-1)
- USNS Puerto Rico (HST-2)
