= USNS Spearhead =

Spearhead-class expeditionary fast transport

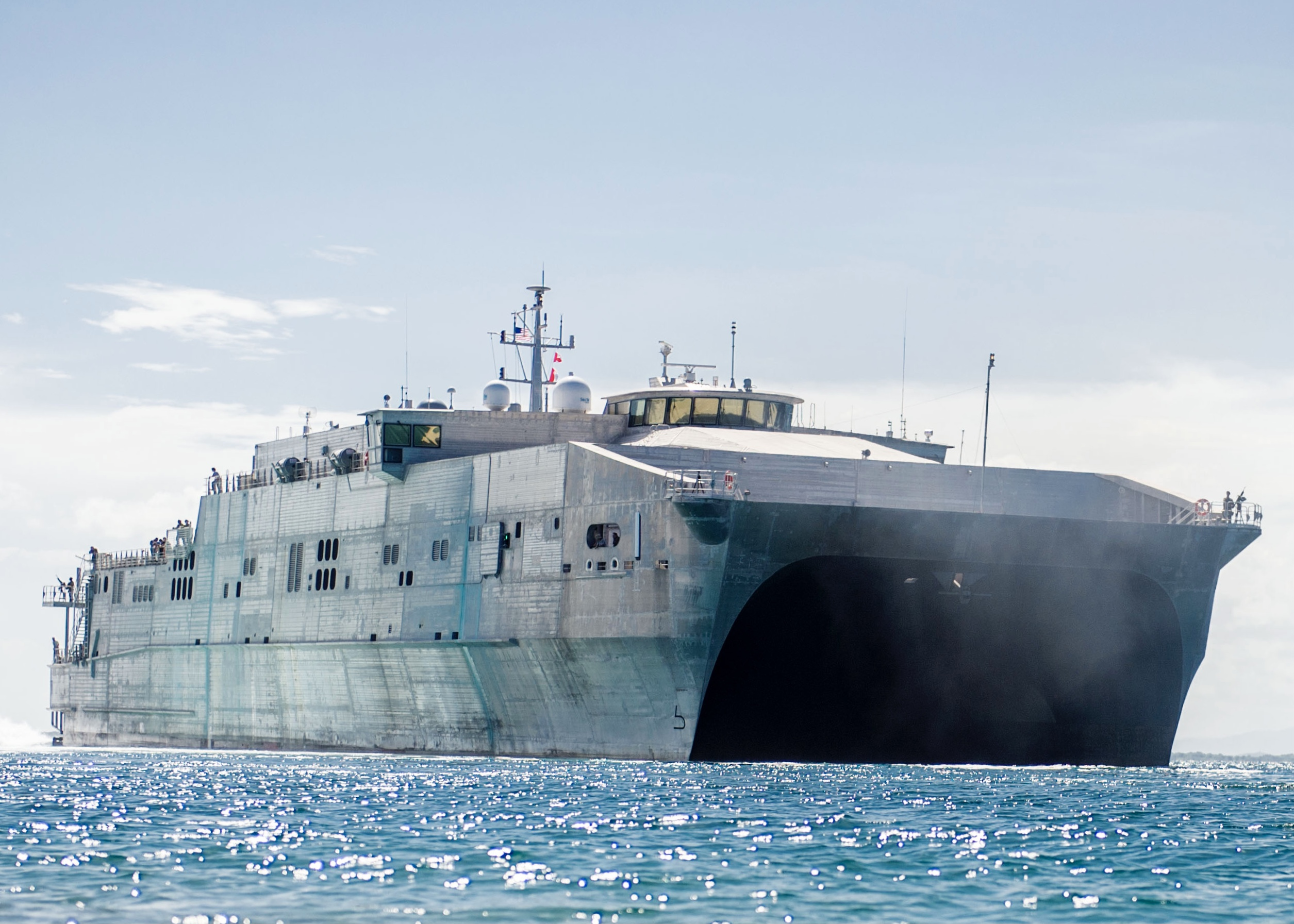
- USNS Spearhead departs Puerto Castilla on 2 September 2014

History

United States
- Name: Spearhead
- Namesake: Spearhead
- Operator: Military Sealift Command
- Builder: Austal USA
- Laid down: 22 July 2010
- Launched: 12 September 2011
- Christened: 17 September 2011
- In service: 5 December 2012
- Out of service: 1 May 2025
- Reclassified: T-EPF-1, 2015
- Stricken: 1 May 2025
- Identification: IMO number: 9647992; MMSI number: 369460000; Callsign: NSPD; Hull number: JHSV-1
- Motto: Ducere Classem; (To Lead The Fleet)
- Status: Inactive
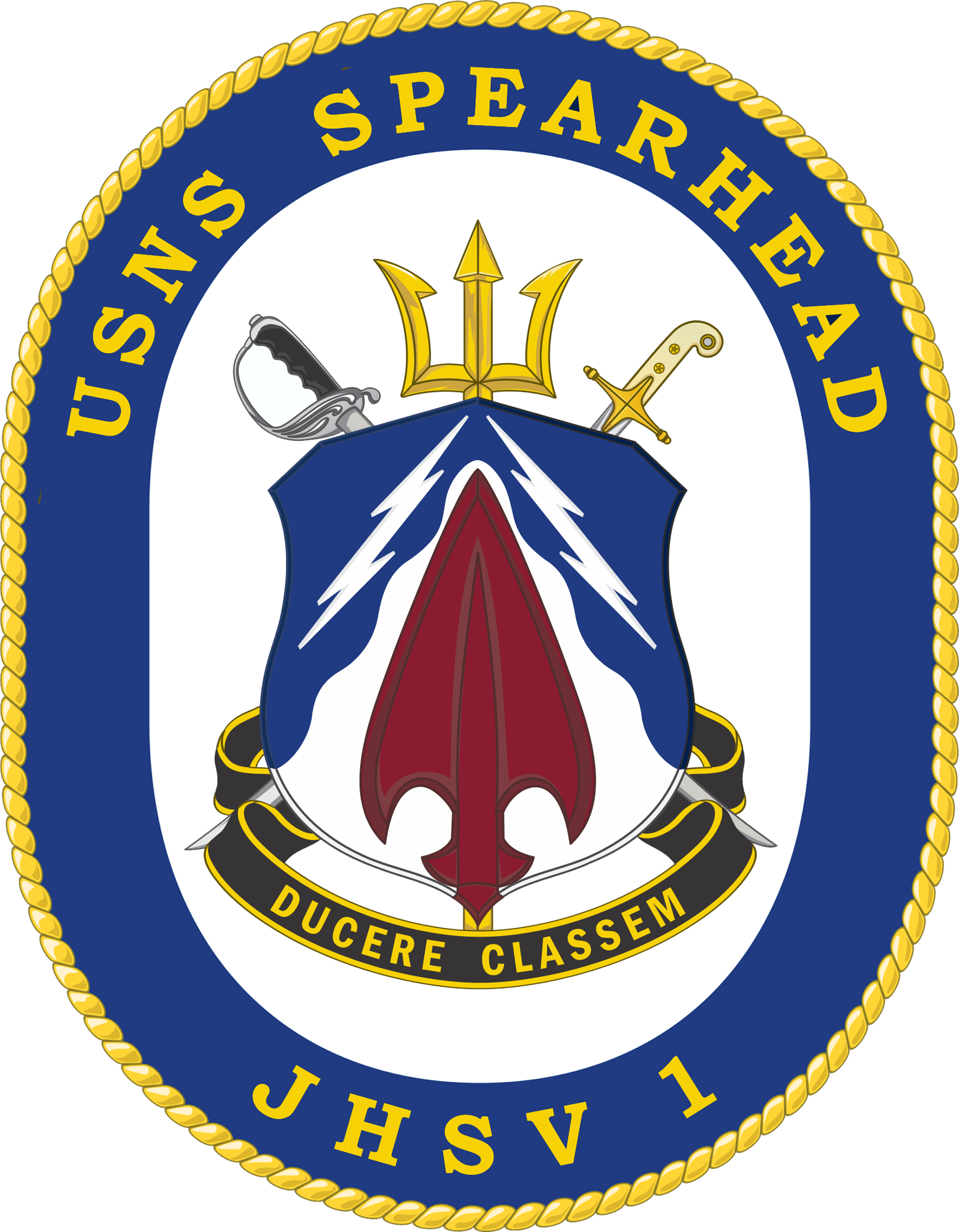
- Badge

General characteristics
- Class & type: Spearhead-class expeditionary fast transport
- Length: 103.0 m (337 ft 11 in)
- Beam: 28.5 m (93 ft 6 in)
- Draft: 3.83 m (12 ft 7 in)
- Propulsion: 4 × MTU 20V8000 M71L diesel engines; 4 × ZF 60000NR2H reduction gears
- Speed: 43 knots (80 km/h; 49 mph)
- Troops: 312
- Crew: Capacity of 41, 22 in normal service
- Aviation facilities: Helipad

USNS Spearhead (JHSV-1/T-EPF-1) is the lead ship of the Spearhead-class expeditionary fast transport to be operated by the United States Navy's Military Sealift Command. USNS Spearhead was christened on 17 September 2011.

== Design ==
Spearhead, and other ships of her class, are built to a modular design that allows them to be rapidly refitted with various equipment within a 20,000-square-foot (1,900 m^{2}) bay, depending on the mission at hand. Spearhead is planned for non-combat missions, such as transportation of troops or equipment.

Spearhead is 103 meters (338 ft) long and 28.5 meters (94 ft) in beam, and has a draft of 3.83 meters (12.6 ft). She has space for 41 crewmembers, though under normal conditions will sail with 22, as well as sleeping accommodations for up to 150 people and an additional 312 seats for troop transport. She is powered by four MTU 20V8000 M71L engines, each with a power of 9.1 megawatts (12,200 hp), driving four Wärtsilä WLD 1400 SR waterjets through ZF 60000NR2H reduction gears. This allows for a maximum speed of 43 knots (49 mph; 80 km/h) and a service speed of 35 knots (40 mph; 65 km/h). There are also facilities for one helicopter.

== Construction and career ==
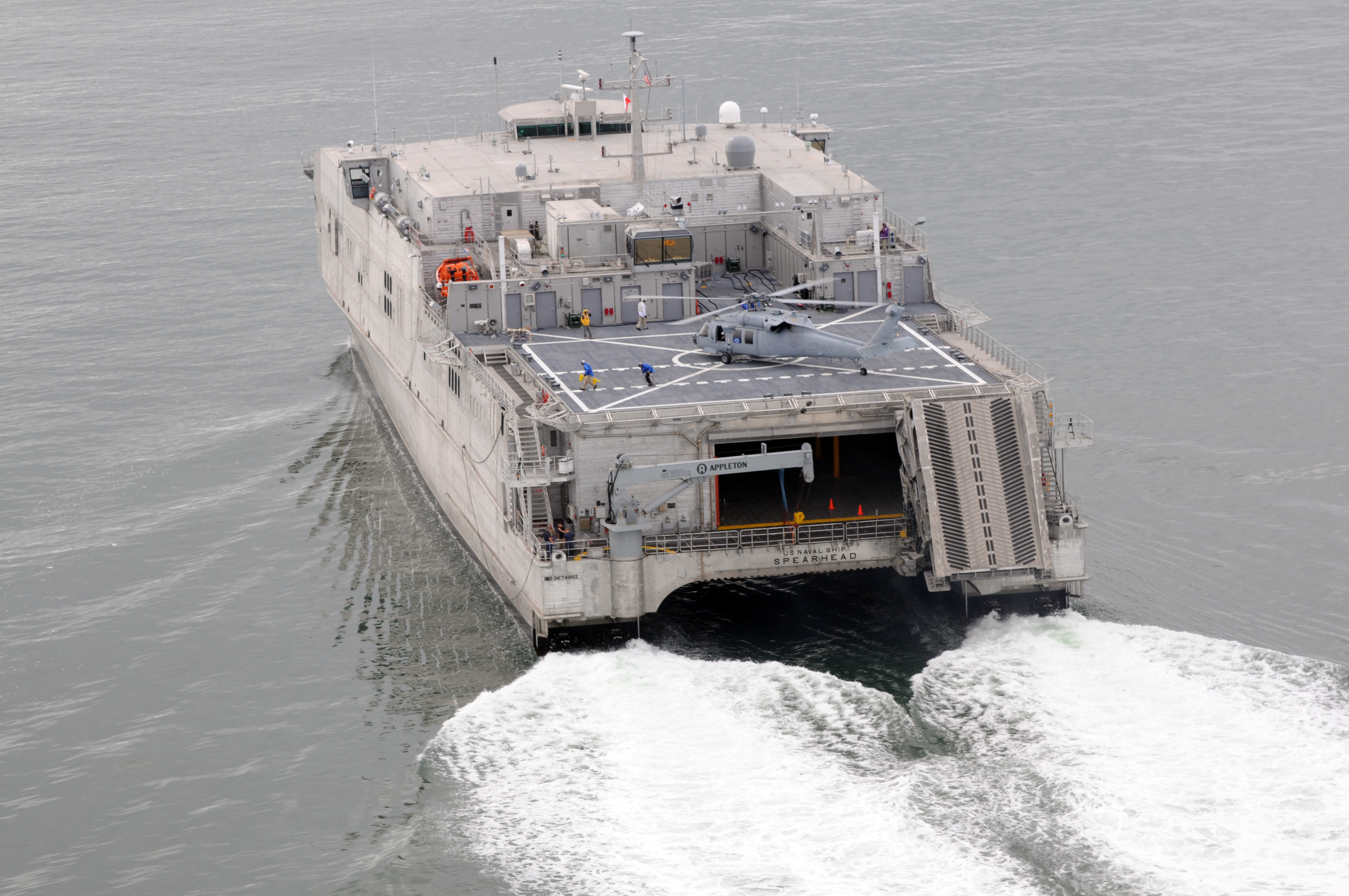
Spearhead undergoing high-speed trials in 2013

Construction of Spearhead began on 22 July 2010, when the ship's keel was laid at the Austal facility in Mobile, Alabama in a ceremony that included officials from the US Navy, the US Army, the state of Alabama and the city of Mobile. At the time, Spearhead was intended for service with the US Army in the 7th Sustainment Brigade as USAV Spearhead.

Spearhead was launched on 8 September 2011, though she did not enter the water until several days later; her launch was the moving of the vessel from the shed where she was constructed onto a floating drydock. At the time, she was scheduled to be delivered to the Navy in early 2012, a delay from the original target of September 2011.

Spearhead was christened on 17 September 2011. Her sponsor was a former army officer, Kenneth Wahlman; as part of the ceremony, his daughter Catherine Wahlman (Virginia Polytechnic Institute and State University Corps of Cadets class of 2013) broke a bottle of champagne across Spearhead's bow. Spearhead, after delivery to the Navy in early 2012, will undergo sea trials and tests, and in the first quarter of fiscal year 2013 is planned to begin operations, homeported at Naval Amphibious Base Little Creek. She will be crewed by civilian mariners (merchant seaman) from the Military Sealift Command, and her first captain was Douglas D. Casavant Jr.

In August 2012 Spearhead made a "clean sweep" of her acceptance trials.

Spearhead was formally delivered to the Navy on 5 December 2012, eight months late and $31 million over budget. She made her first deployment to Europe and Africa in early 2014, followed by a trip to Latin America.

On 7 March 2014, Spearhead visited Liberia, where Marines conducted a rigid-hulled inflatable boat drill.

On 12 June 2014, the Spearhead was conducting routine testing off the coast of Key West. In the early morning, lightning struck an aerostat that was tethered to the vessel. The strike caused the aerostat to deflate and land in the water, where it sank.

During operations in 2015, Spearhead experienced bow damage from rough seas requiring more than $500,000 (USD) in repairs. It was determined that a design change that Austal recommended to the Navy late in the design phase to save weight has resulted in a weakened bow structure. The first five ships in the class will need to be returned to Austal to have upgrades done to improve the superstructure, at a cost of $1.2M each. The remaining ships which are still in various stages of construction will be upgraded as well.

From July to October 2018, Spearhead deployed to the Caribbean, South and Central America as part of the Navy's annual Southern Partnership Station (SPS) 2018. SPS is a project with regional partner nations to conduct subject matter expert exchanges and contribute to water well construction projects. SPS 2018 saw Spearhead visit Panama, Colombia, Honduras, El Salvador, and Trinidad and Tobago.

During the summer of 2019, Spearhead was part of a Navy project to test the EPF design as a drone mothership with various unmanned aerial vehicles (UAVs).

As of 1 October 2020, Spearhead's status was changed to "Inactive, Reduced Operating Status". As of October 2022, she has been moored at the Philadelphia Naval Yard. She was stricken on 1 May 2025.
