= USS Montgomery (LCS-8) =

Independence-class littoral combat ship

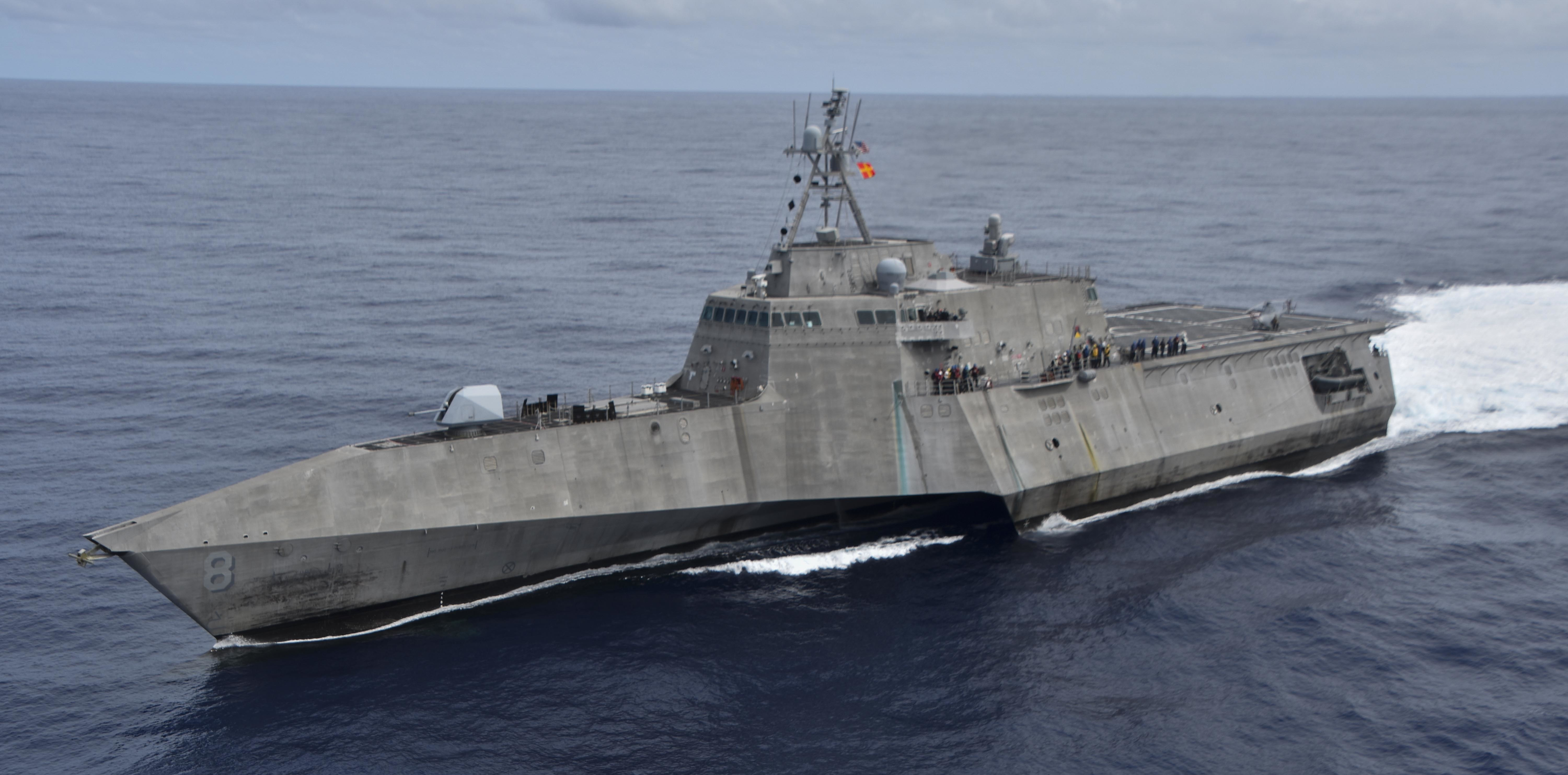
- USS Montgomery underway in May 2020

History

United States
- Name: Montgomery
- Namesake: Montgomery
- Awarded: 29 December 2010
- Builder: Austal USA
- Laid down: 25 June 2013
- Launched: 6 August 2014
- Sponsored by: Mary Blackshear Sessions
- Christened: 8 November 2014
- Acquired: 23 June 2016
- Commissioned: 10 September 2016
- Home port: San Diego
- Identification: MMSI number: 369970910; Hull number: LCS-8
- Motto: Audemus Jura Nostra Defendere; (We Dare Defend Our Rights)
- Status: Active
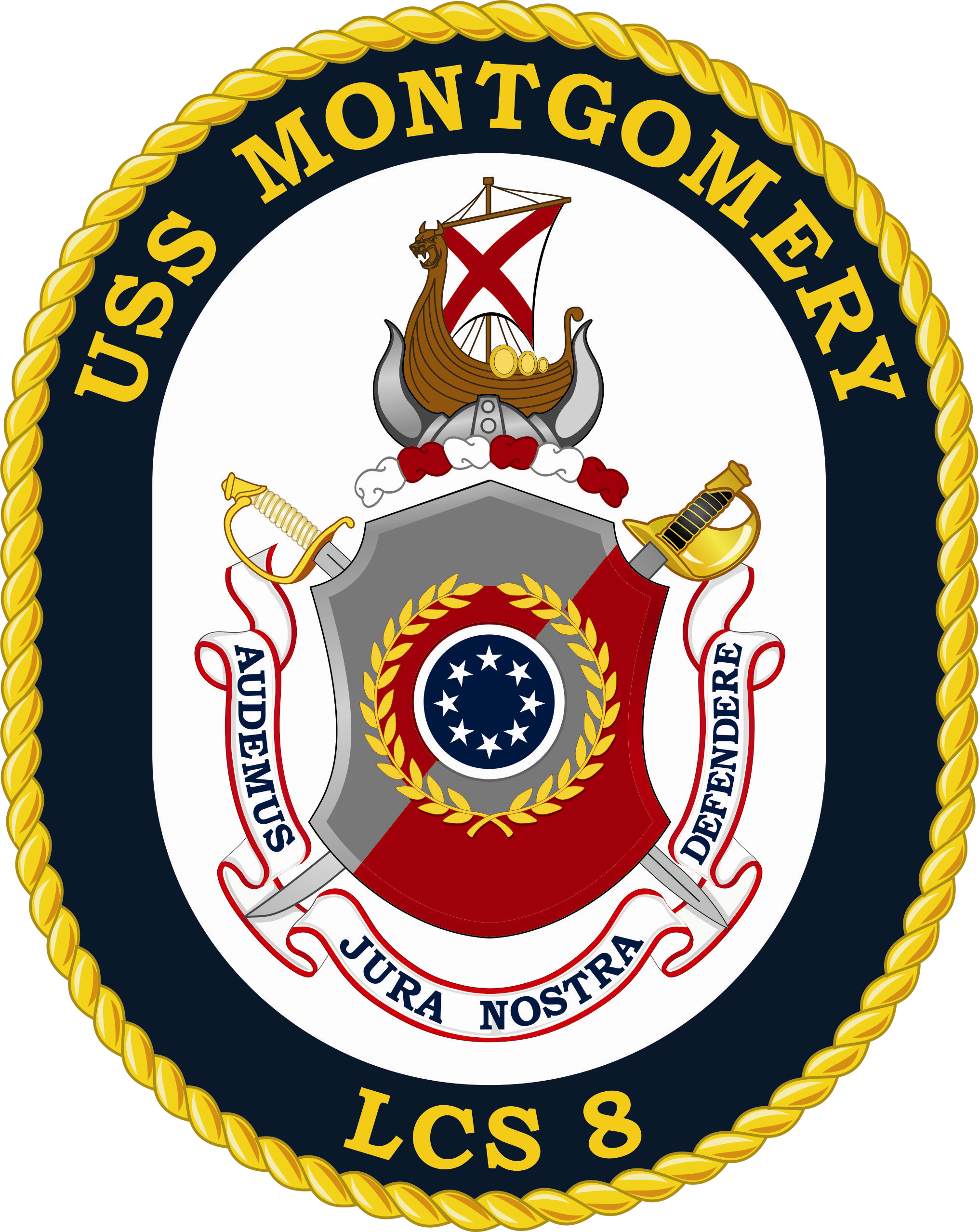
- Badge

General characteristics
- Class & type: Independence-class littoral combat ship
- Displacement: 2,307 metric tons light, 3,104 metric tons full, 797 metric tons deadweight
- Length: 127.4 m (418 ft)
- Beam: 31.6 m (104 ft)
- Draft: 14 ft (4.27 m)
- Propulsion: 2× gas turbines, 2× diesel, 4× waterjets, retractable Azimuth thruster, 4× diesel generators
- Speed: 40+ knots, 47 knots (54 mph; 87 km/h) sprint
- Range: 4,300 nmi (7,964 km; 4,948 mi) at 20 knots (37 km/h; 23 mph)+
- Capacity: 210 tonnes
- Complement: 40 core crew (8 officers, 32 enlisted) plus up to 35 mission crew
- Sensors & processing systems: Sea Giraffe 3D Surface/Air RADAR; Bridgemaster-E Navigational RADAR; AN/KAX-2 EO/IR sensor for GFC
- Electronic warfare & decoys: EDO ES-3601 ESM; 4× SRBOC rapid bloom chaff launchers
- Armament: BAE Systems Mk 110 57 mm gun; 4× .50 cal (12.7 mm) guns (2 aft, 2 forward); Two 30 mm MK46 cannons for surface threat defense; Evolved SeaRAM 11 cell missile launcher; Mission modules
- Aircraft carried: 2× MH-60R/S Seahawks

USS Montgomery (LCS-8) is an Independence-class littoral combat ship of the United States Navy. She is the fourth ship to be named for Montgomery, the capital of Alabama.

== Design ==
In 2002, the United States Navy initiated a program to develop the first of a fleet of littoral combat ships. The Navy initially ordered two trimaran hulled ships from General Dynamics, which became known as the Independence-class littoral combat ship after the first ship of the class, USS Independence. Even-numbered U.S. Navy littoral combat ships are built using the Independence-class trimaran design, while odd-numbered ships are based on a competing design, the conventional monohull Freedom-class littoral combat ship. The initial order of littoral combat ships involved a total of four ships, including two of the Independence-class design. On 29 December 2010, the Navy announced that it was awarding Austal USA a contract to build ten additional Independence-class littoral combat ships.

Montgomery is the fourth Independence-class littoral combat ship to be built. The ship is the third Independence-class vessel to feature improvements over the Independence (LCS-2) design, including standard 7 metres (23 ft) long rigid-hulled inflatable boats and improved corrosion protection and propulsion.

== History ==
Montgomery was built by Austal USA in Mobile, Alabama. The ship was launched in a ceremony at the Austal shipyards on 6 August 2014. Montgomery was christened on 8 November 2014. The ship was commissioned on 10 September 2016 in Mobile, Alabama. She has been assigned to Littoral Combat Ship Squadron One.

On 13 September 2016, Montgomery experienced two unrelated engineering casualties within a 24-hour period while transiting from Mobile, Alabama to her homeport of San Diego, California. The first casualty happened when the crew detected a seawater leak in the hydraulic cooling system. Later that day, Montgomery experienced a failure with one of her gas turbine engines. Due to the failures, Montgomery headed to Naval Station Mayport for repairs.

On 4 October 2016, a tug collided with Montgomery while the latter was getting underway to avoid Hurricane Matthew. Due to the collision, a crack measuring a foot in length was caused amidships, approximately three feet above the waterline. Five strakes were also bent. Temporary repairs were conducted, and the ship left port as planned.

On 29 October 2016 Montgomery sustained an 18-inch-long (46 cm) long crack to her hull while passing through the Panama Canal en route to her homeport in San Diego. Montgomery was traveling from the Atlantic to the Pacific Ocean through the canal's series of locks when she hit the concrete center lock wall while under the control of a local Panama Canal pilot.

During the summer of 2019, the ship was equipped with MQ-8C Fire Scout drones.

Due to mishandling of a sexual harassment complaint, the Navy removed both the commanding and executive officers on 30 December 2021, and announced the executive officer of the USS Coronado (LCS-4) would be placed in temporary command until a permanent replacement could be selected.

On 12 May 2022, the Montgomery tested an AGM-114L Hellfire missile at a land target for the first time in the Pacific Ocean.

== Awards ==
- Battle "E" – (2019)
