= USS Jackson (LCS-6) =

Independence-class littoral combat ship

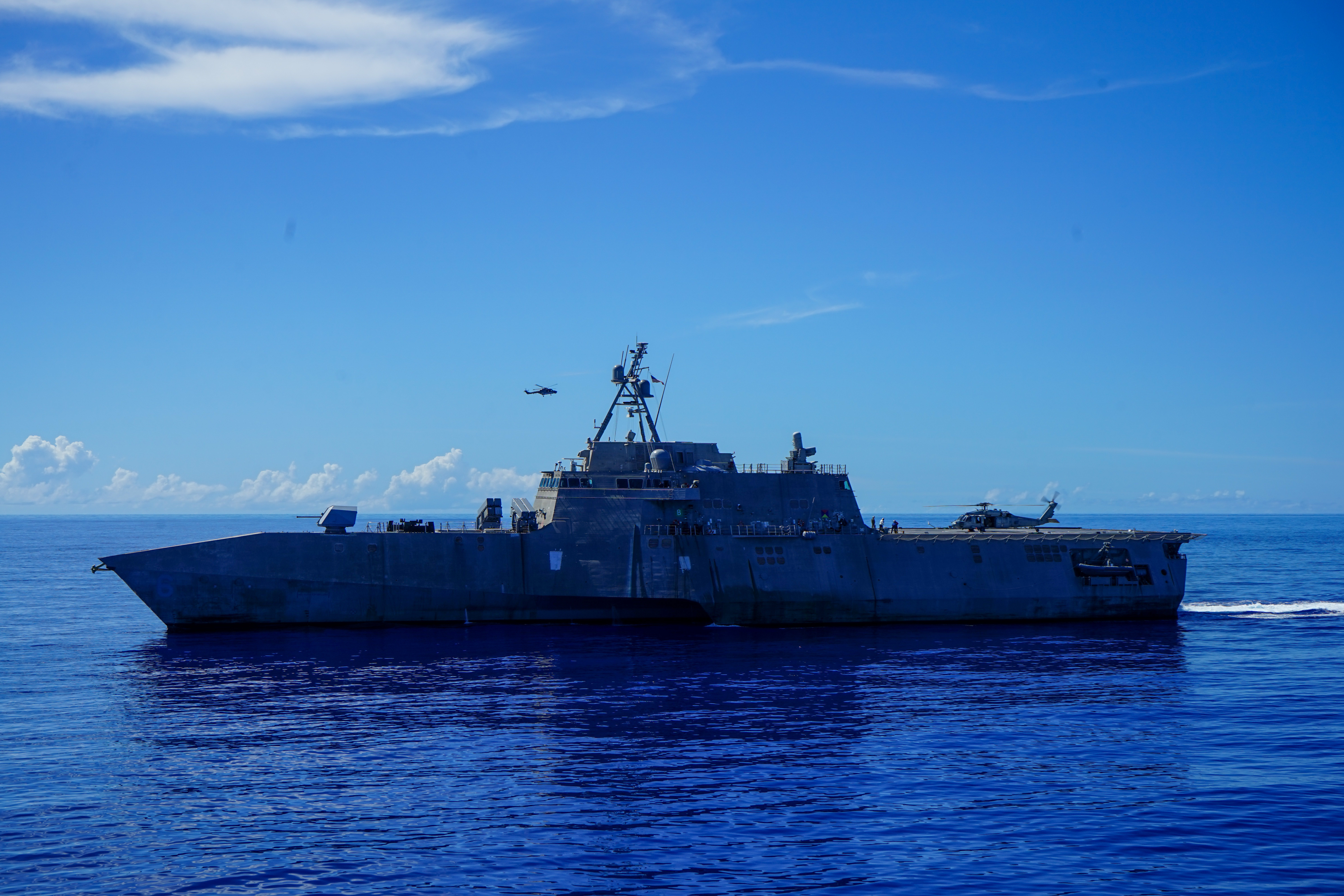
- USS Jackson on 18 October 2021

History

United States
- Name: Jackson
- Namesake: Jackson
- Awarded: 29 December 2010
- Builder: Austal USA
- Laid down: 18 October 2012
- Launched: 14 December 2013
- Sponsored by: Dr. Kate Cochran
- Acquired: 11 August 2015
- Commissioned: 5 December 2015
- Home port: San Diego
- Identification: MMSI number: 369970885; Hull number: LCS-6
- Motto: Victoribus Spolia; (To The Victors, The Spoils)
- Status: Active
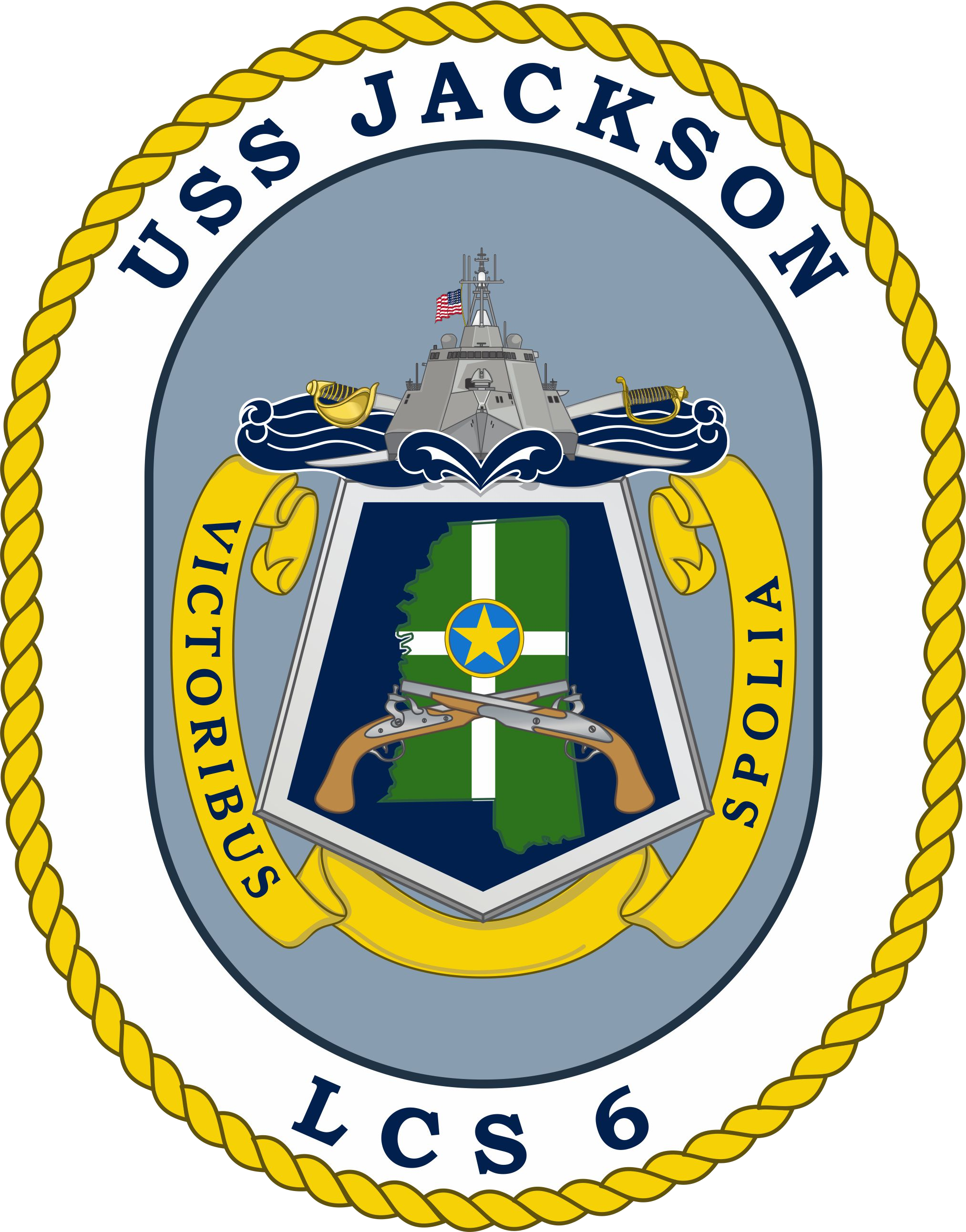
- Badge

General characteristics
- Class & type: Independence-class littoral combat ship
- Displacement: 2,307 metric tons light, 3,104 metric tons full, 797 metric tons deadweight
- Length: 127.4 m (418 ft)
- Beam: 31.6 m (104 ft)
- Draft: 14 ft (4.27 m)
- Propulsion: 2 × General Electric LM2500 gas turbines; 4 × waterjets, retractable Azimuth thruster; 4 × diesel generators
- Speed: 40+ knots, 47 knots (54 mph; 87 km/h) sprint
- Range: 4,300 nautical miles (8,000 km; 4,900 mi) at 20 knots (37 km/h; 23 mph)+
- Capacity: 210 tonnes
- Complement: 40 core crew (8 officers, 32 enlisted) plus up to 35 mission crew
- Sensors & processing systems: Sea Giraffe 3D Surface/Air RADAR; Bridgemaster-E Navigational RADAR; AN/KAX-2 EO/IR sensor for GFC
- Electronic warfare & decoys: EDO ES-3601 ESM; 4 × SRBOC rapid bloom chaff launchers
- Armament: BAE Systems Mk 110 57 mm gun; 4 × .50 cal (12.7 mm) guns (2 aft, 2 forward); Evolved SeaRAM 11 cell missile launcher; Mission modules
- Aircraft carried: 2 × MH-60R/S Seahawks

USS Jackson (LCS-6) is an Independence-class littoral combat ship of the United States Navy, and the first ship to be named for Jackson, the capital of Mississippi.

== Design ==
In 2002, the U.S. Navy initiated a program to develop the first of a fleet of littoral combat ships. The Navy initially ordered two trimaran hulled ships from General Dynamics, which became known as the Independence-class littoral combat ships after the first ship of the class, USS Independence. Even-numbered U.S. Navy littoral combat ships are built using the Independence-class trimaran design, while odd-numbered ships are based on a competing design, the conventional monohull Freedom-class littoral combat ship. The initial order of littoral combat ships involved a total of four ships, including two of the Independence-class design. On 29 December 2010, the Navy announced that it was awarding Austal USA a contract to build ten additional Independence-class littoral combat ships.

Jackson is the third Independence-class littoral combat ship to be built. Jackson was built by Austal USA in Mobile, Alabama. Jackson is the second Independence-class ship to carry standard 7 metres (23 ft) long rigid-hulled inflatable boats and improvements in corrosion protection and propulsion over the original Independence (LCS-2) design.

== History ==
Construction of Jackson began on 1 August 2011 with the first cutting of aluminum at Austal USA's Modular Manufacturing facility in Mobile, Alabama. The name of the ship was announced on 5 October 2011. The ship was launched on 14 December 2013. Jackson was delivered to the Navy on 11 August 2015 and placed into service that day. The ship was commissioned in a 5 December 2015 ceremony at Gulfport, Mississippi. She has been assigned to Littoral Combat Ship Squadron One

Jackson underwent the first of three shock trials in waters off Florida on 16 June 2016, and the last being reported having been completed the week prior to 20 July 2016. A charge of 10,000 pounds (4,500 kg) was set off at around 100 yards (91 m) with the ship wired with around 260 instruments to record the effects.

On 23 May 2022, Jackson participated in the 28th Annual CARAT exercise with the Royal Thai Navy as a part of the Combined Task Force (CTF) 72. Jackson is attached to DESRON 7 and the US 7th Fleet. The MQ-8C Fire Scout unmanned helicopter was recently deployed on the ship.
