= Austal USA =

Shipbuilder subsidiary in Mobile, Alabama

Coordinates: 30.69214°N 88.03298°W

- Type: Limited liability company
- Industry: Shipbuilding
- Founded: 1999
- Headquarters: Blakeley Island, Mobile, Alabama, United States
- Products: Warships
- Revenue: ▲ A$1.39 billion (US$1.04 billion) (2025)
- Operating income: ▲ A$97.67 million (US$73.43 million) (2025)
- Number of employees: c. 3,500
- Parent: Austal
- Website: usa.austal.com

Austal USA is an American shipbuilder based on Blakeley Island in Mobile, Alabama. It is a subsidiary of the Australian shipbuilder Austal, operating under a Special Security Arrangement which allows it to work independently and separately on some of the most sensitive United States defense programs despite its foreign ownership.

Austal USA was formed in 1999 when Austal formed a 70:30 joint venture with Bender Shipbuilding & Repair Co to build ferries. Austal bought out its partner in September 2006.

Notable projects for the shipbuilder include the United States Navy's Independence class littoral combat ship (first launched in 2008) Spearhead class expeditionary fast transport (first launched in 2010), and United States Coast Guard's Heritage-class cutter (contract awarded in 2022).

== Projects ==
Austal USA's first contract was for two crew supply vessels for service in the Gulf of Mexico. These were followed by a ferry for Lighthouse Fast Ferry of New York.

Austal USA built the Lake Express for service across Lake Michigan, and the Alakai for Hawaii Superferry. Huakai, the second high-speed vehicle-passenger catamaran for Hawaii Superferry was launched at Austal USA. At 113 meters (371 feet) long, the new vessel is 6 meters (20 feet) longer than the Alakai, thanks to a bi-fold ramp, added by Austal to its stern, for use in austere ports without shore-side loading facilities, making it suitable for military use. The National Geographic Channel series MegaStructures featured an episode in September 2007 that detailed the construction, launch, and sea trials of the Alakai, the first catamaran Hawaii Superferry.

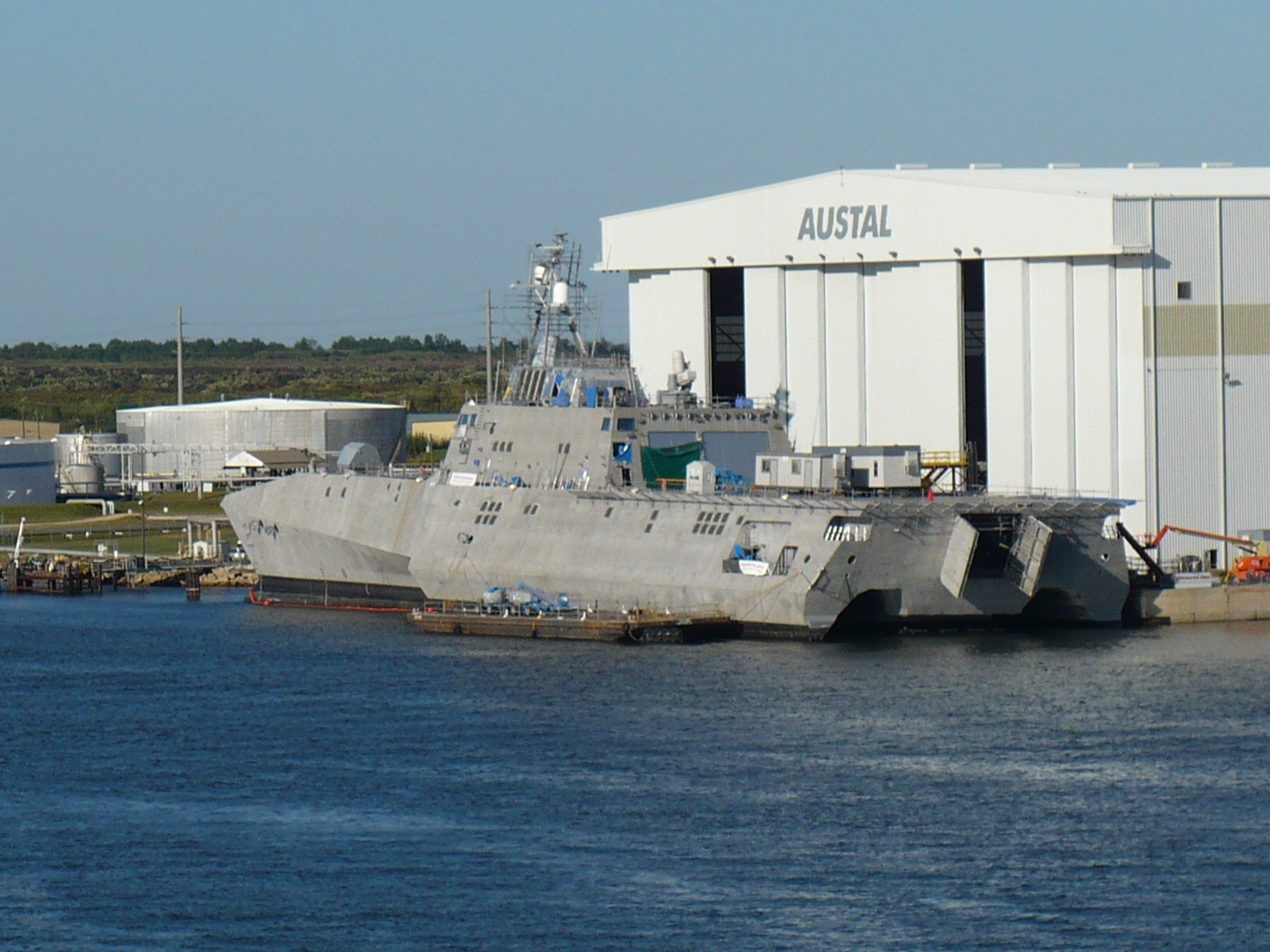
USS Independence (LCS-2) at the Austal USA shipyards along the Mobile River in Mobile, Alabama

Austal USA is currently constructing the Independence class of littoral combat ships for the United States Navy, based on a 127 m (417 ft) advanced trimaran seaframe. In March 2015, Navy Secretary Ray Mabus testified before Congress that the Navy intends to purchase 52 of the vessels. The final 20 will be upgraded with new capabilities. The cost of each ship is about $350 million.

In November 2008, Austal USA won a United States Navy contract to build ten Spearhead-class expeditionary fast transport ships. The design, with a catamaran seaframe, was drawn from the Austal-built MV Westpac Express. Unlike the Littoral Combat Ship, the Joint High Speed Vessel is for transport, not combat.

In July 2010, Austal USA hosted a keel-laying ceremony at its shipyard to signify the erection of the first modules on USAV Spearhead (JHSV 1), lead ship in the 10-ship Joint High Speed Vessel (JHSV) program, The JHSV program has a potential worth of over $1.6 billion for the company. In December 2012, the navy awarded its final option under its current contract, and ordered JHSV-10.

Austal USA signed a contract for 10 Joint High Speed Vessels (JHSVs). One of them, the Trenton (JHSV 5) completed acceptance trials in March 2015 and was delivered in April 2015 to the Navy's Military Sealift Command.

In May 2016, Austal USA was awarded a $18.5 million contract from the Navy for the 12th Expeditionary Fast Transport (EPF) vessel.

On June 30, 2022, the United States Coast Guard awarded Austal USA a contract to build up to 11 Offshore Patrol Cutters under Phase 2 of the program, with a potential total combined price of $3.3 billion if all 11 ships are ordered.

== Legal ==
=== Unionizing efforts ===
Following complaints from the Sheet Metal Workers' International Association (SMWIA), Austal USA has twice been found to have engaged in unfair labor practices with respect to the organizing effort of unions by the National Labor Relations Board. Unionization had been rejected by employees in elections held in May 2002 and April 2008. A third attempt in August 2011 was again rejected with a vote of 613 against unionization to 367 for it. The SMWIA filed a new complaint with the labor board after the result.

=== Discrimination allegations ===
In March 2008, the company was sued by 22 employees for alleged racial discrimination and a hostile work environment. The company was found not guilty in separate discrimination trials that culminated in October 2011 and January 2012. A request for a new discrimination trial was rejected in March 2012 by a federal court. After appeals, seven of the plaintiffs were allowed to proceed to trial. Juries found in favor of Austal USA in April 2015.

=== Accounting fraud ===
In 2023 senior Austal executives were charged with orchestrating an accounting fraud scheme for the Littoral Combat Ship program.
