= HSC Dublin Swift =

High-speed catamaran built in 2001

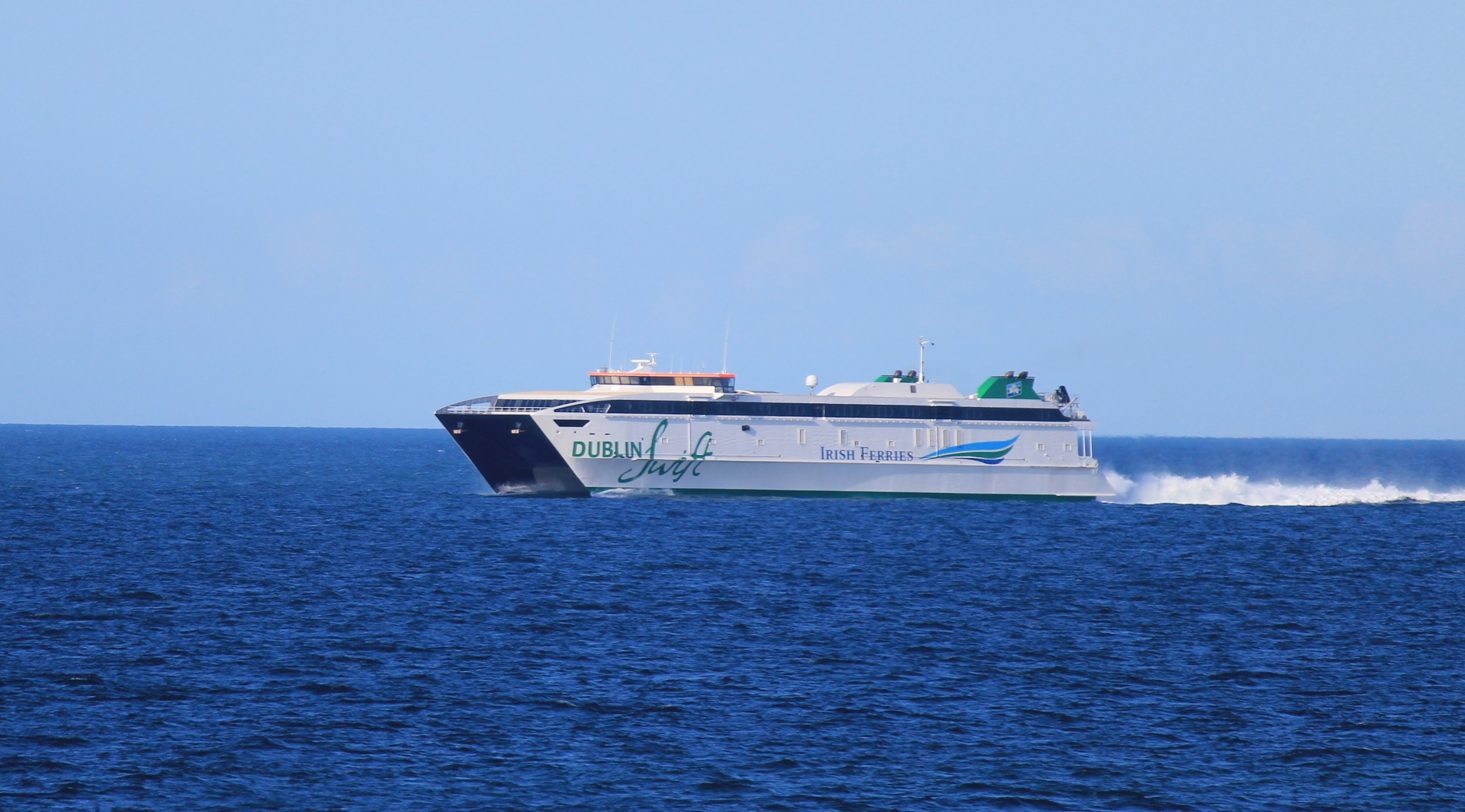
- Dublin Swift in August 2018

History

Cyprus
- Name: 2001-2018 WestPac Express (HSV-4676); 2018-present Dublin Swift
- Owner: 2001-2016 Austal; 2016-present Irish Continental Group
- Operator: 2001-2018 United States Navy; 2018-present Irish Ferries
- Port of registry: Limassol
- Route: Dublin-Holyhead
- Builder: Austal, Henderson, Western Australia
- Yard number: 130
- Launched: 26 March 2001
- Completed: 2001
- Identification: IMO number: 9243227; MMSI number: 369323000; Callsign: WDB5285
- Status: In service

General characteristics
- Class & type: Roll-on/roll-off catamaran
- Tonnage: 2,111 tons (light)
- Length: 100.99 m (331.3 ft)
- Beam: 26.64 m (87.4 ft)
- Draft: 4.29 m (14.1 ft) (fully loaded)
- Installed power: Four Caterpillar 3618 diesel engines each producing 7,200 kW @ 1,050 rpm
- Propulsion: Water-jet propulsion
- Speed: 20 knots (37 km/h; 23 mph) (economical); 33 knots (61 km/h; 38 mph) (warranted)
- Range: 1,240 nmi @ 33 kn (laden); 2,182 nmi @ 20 kn (laden); 2,927 nmi @ 20 kn (ballast)
- Capacity: Irish Ferries capacity: Passengers: 900; Vehicles: 251 cars or 16 articulated lorries with up to 96 cars also carried.; Troop capacity: 970; Cargo capacity: 20,698 square feet: Designed for roll on/roll off service (typical loads - 153 HUMMWVs or 12 AAVPs and 20 LAVs)
- Crew: 11 military; 13 civilian

Dublin Swift is a high-speed catamaran built in 2001 by Austal as a passenger and vehicle ferry. Following conversion into a Maritime Prepositioning ship, the vessel was chartered by the United States Navy's Military Sealift Command until January 2018 as WestPac Express. It was then converted for civilian passenger ferry by Irish Ferries and renamed Dublin Swift.

== History ==
After a demonstration in 2001, Austal signed a three-year lease with Military Sealift Command for the WestPac Express.

In March 2011, the WestPac Express was deployed as part of the US response to the 2011 Tōhoku earthquake and tsunami. In recognition of this service, Admiral Mark Buzby presented the ship’s crew with United States Merchant Marine Outstanding Achievement Medal at a ceremony on board the ship in Yokohama, Japan. The lease was renewed successively until the end of 2017.

In April 2016 WestPac Express was sold to Irish Continental Group, who continued to lease it to the Military Sealift Command until the end of 2017.

With its charter to the US Navy completed, in January 2018 WestPac Express arrived in Belfast for refurbishment at Harland & Wolff to replace the Jonathan Swift on Irish Ferries' Dublin to Holyhead route. It entered service in April 2018.

== Service ==
Dublin Swift operates the Dublin–Holyhead route for Irish Ferries. The crossing typically takes about 2 hours 15 minutes, compared with approximately 3 hours 15 minutes for conventional ferries. The vessel generally operates between spring and autumn and is laid up during the winter months.

== Follow on orders ==
With a design based on the WestPac Express, Austal USA built 10 Spearhead-class expeditionary fast transport vessels for use by the United States Navy, the United States Marine Corps and the United States Coast Guard with a further two on order.
