= USCGC Red Cedar =

Red-class buoy tender of the US Coast Guard

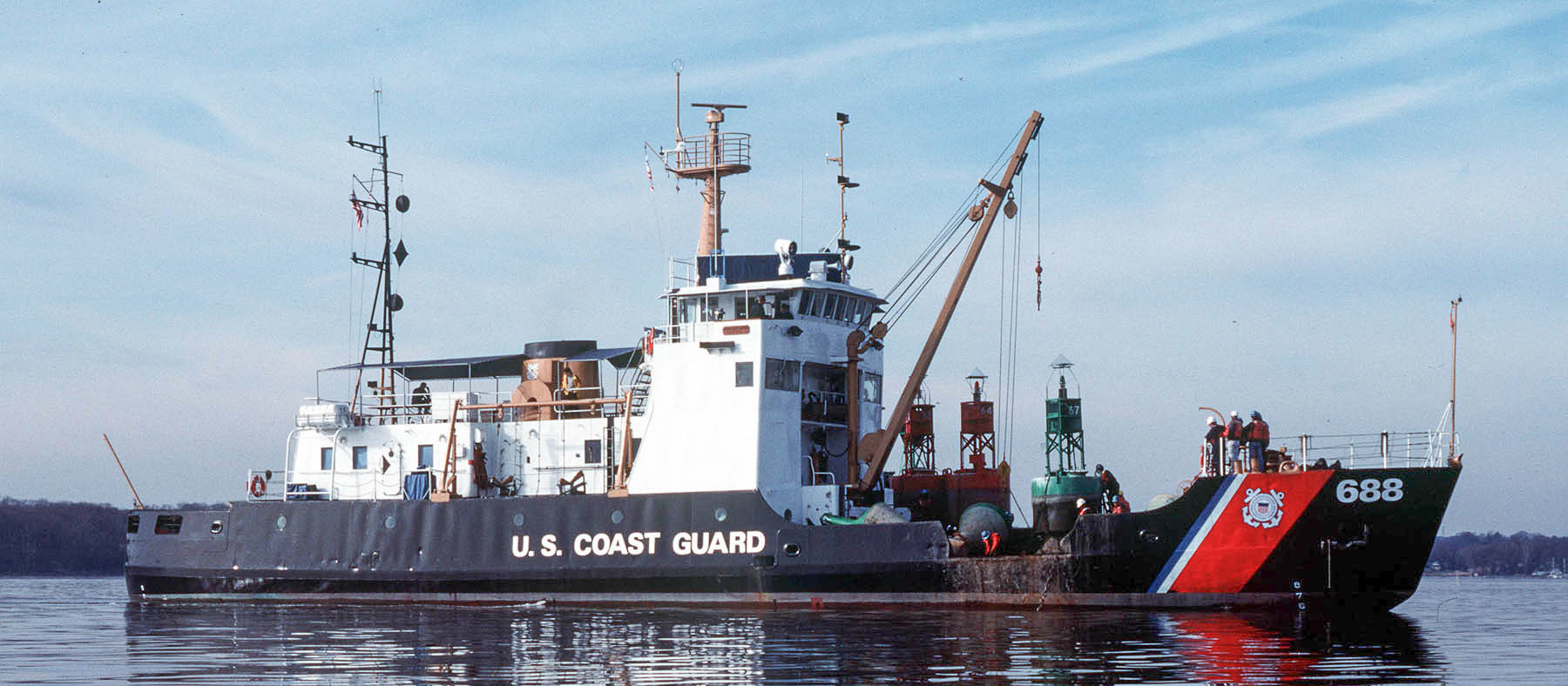
- USCGC Red Cedar

History

United States
- Name: Red Cedar
- Operator: US Coast Guard
- Builder: US Coast Guard Yard
- Launched: 1 August 1970
- Commissioned: 18 December 1970
- Decommissioned: 16 March 1999
- Identification: Callsign: NPDC
- Fate: Transferred to Argentia in 1999

Argentina
- Name: Ciudad de Zárate
- Operator: Argentine Navy
- Commissioned: 30 March 1999
- Identification: MMSI number: 701000018; Callsign: LOCZ
- Status: Active

General characteristics
- Class & type: Red-class buoy tender
- Displacement: 572 long tons (581 t) full load
- Length: 157 ft (47.9 m)
- Beam: 33 ft (10.1 m)
- Draft: 7 ft (2.1 m)
- Installed power: 1,800 hp (1,300 kW)
- Propulsion: 2 × Caterpillar 398A diesel engines
- Speed: 12.5 knots (23.2 km/h; 14.4 mph)
- Range: 2,450 nmi (4,540 km; 2,820 mi) at 10 kn (19 km/h; 12 mph)
- Crew: 33 (5 officers, 28 enlisted)

USCGC Red Cedar (WLM-688) is a Red-class coastal buoy tender that was designed, built, owned, and operated by the United States Coast Guard. She was launched in 1970 and homeported in Norfolk, Virginia. Her primary mission was to maintain over 400 aides to navigation in Chesapeake Bay, Tangier Sound, the Potomac, Rappahannock, York, and James Rivers, and other nearby waterways. Her secondary missions included search and rescue, light icebreaking, law enforcement, and marine environmental protection. She was assigned to the 5th Coast Guard District.

At the end of her Coast Guard career in 1999 she was transferred to the Argentine Navy, which renamed her ARA Ciudad de Zárate. She remains in active service.

== Construction and characteristics ==
Red Cedar was built at the Coast Guard Yard in Curtis Bay, Maryland. Her keel was laid down on 1 July 1969. She was launched on 1 August 1970. She was christened by Virginia Downing, wife of U.S. Representative Thomas N. Downing, who was a member of the United States House Committee on Merchant Marine and Fisheries, which had jurisdiction over the Coast Guard budget. Also attending the ceremony were Edward A. Garmatz, chairman of the committee, and Commandant of the Coast Guard Admiral Chester R. Bender. Red Birch's initial cost was $3,402,176. She was the fourth Red-class ship built.

Her hull was built of welded steel plates. The ship was 157 feet (48 m) long overall, with a beam of 33 feet (10 m), and a draft of 7 feet (2.1 m). Her shallow draft and flat bottom was required for her work along the edges of dredged channels, but this hull form made her harder to maneuver and more prone to rolling. Her hull was reinforced for light icebreaking. She displaced 471 tons with a light load, and 572 tons with a full load.

The ship had two Caterpillar D398A 12-cylinder diesel engines rated at 900 horsepower (670 kW) each. These drove two four-bladed controllable-pitch propellers which were 40 inches (1.0 m) in diameter. Red-class ships had a maximum speed of 12.5 knots (23.2 km/h; 14.4 mph). She had a bow thruster for increased maneuverability. This was driven by a power take-off from the starboard propulsion engine.

Red Cedar's tanks held 17,620 U.S. gallons (66,700 L) of diesel fuel. This gave her a range of 2,450 nautical miles (4,540 km; 2,820 mi) at 10 knots (19 km/h; 12 mph), or 2,100 nmi (3,900 km; 2,400 mi) at full speed. There were three engine control stations, two on the bridge wings and one in the pilothouse.

Her buoy deck featured a crane with the ability to lift 10 tons, which could be controlled from two different stations just below the bridge deck. The cranes' hydraulics were driven by a power take-off from the port propulsion engine. Her buoy deck had 1,200 square feet (110 m^{2}) of working space.

The ship had a crew of five officers and twenty-eight enlisted sailors. Crew quarters were air-conditioned, a notable improvement in comfort at the time.

== U.S. Coast Guard service ==
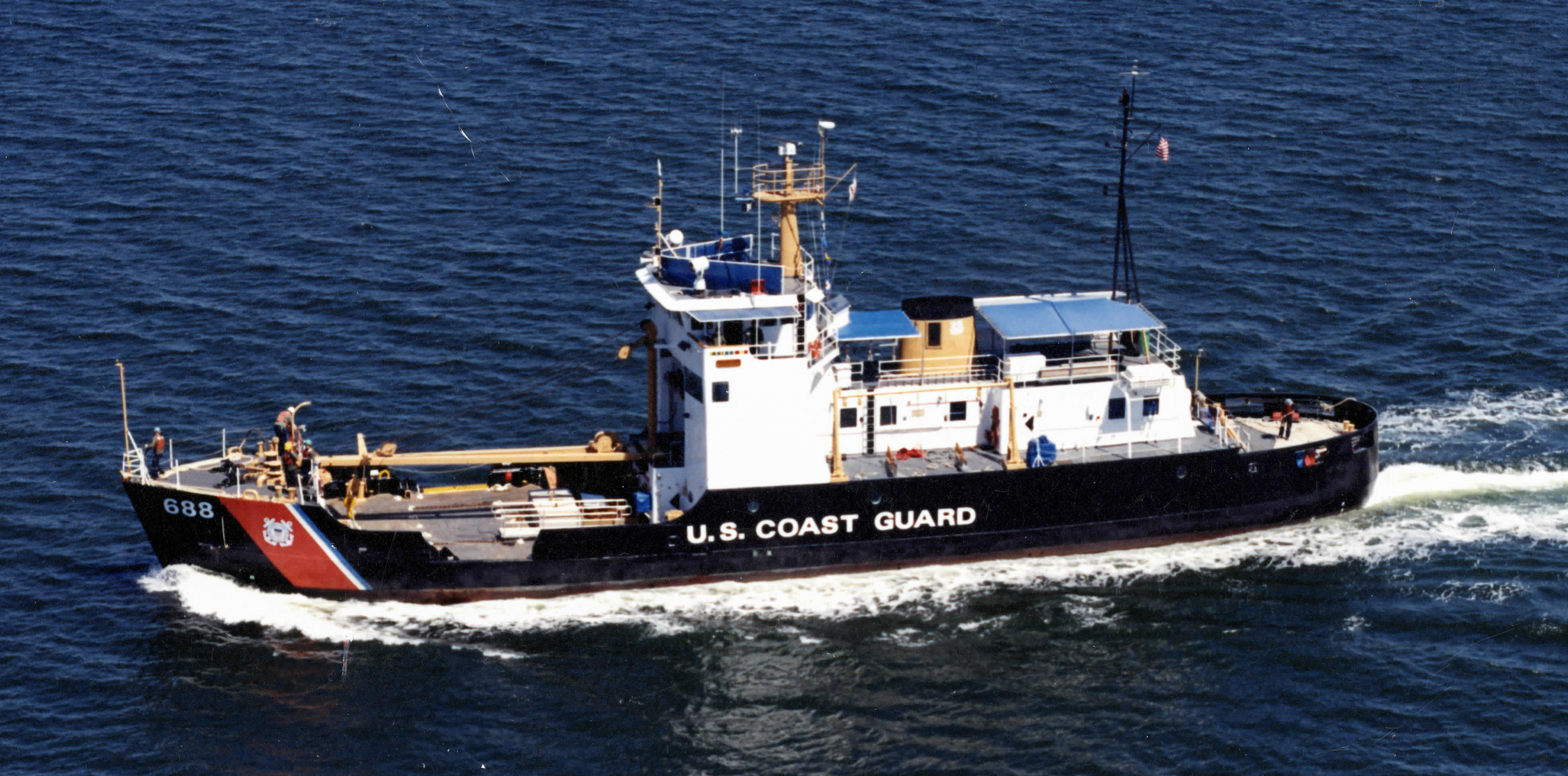
Red Cedar underway

Red Cedar was placed in commission at a ceremony at the Coast Guard Yard on 18 December 1970. The bulk of her time was spent at sea tending her buoy fleet and a number of lighthouses, or moored, maintaining the ship and training the crew. Maintaining her buoys included verifying that they were in their charted positions, replacing lights and batteries, cleaning off marine growth and bird guano, and inspecting and replacing their mooring chains and sinkers. Red Cedar was also responsible for the maintenance of a number of lighthouses in Chesapeake Bay, including the Thimble Shoal Light, Thomas Point Shoal Light, Fort Washington Light, Hambrooks Bar Light, and Craighill Light.

On occasion, she was assigned a variety of other missions, as described below.

=== Search and rescue ===
In October 1972, Red Cedar was sent to Hopewell to assist victims of James River flooding.

Two construction barges at the Hampton Roads Tunnel broke free from their moorings in high winds in February 1973. Red Cedar and USCGC Mohican were dispatched to attempt to capture them.

The Argentine bulk carrier Santa Cruz II collided with USCGC Cuyahoga on 20 October 1978 near the mouth of the Potomac River. The cutter sank, and 11 of her crew were missing after the event. Red Cedar was sent to the scene as a platform for U.S. Navy and Coast Guard divers searching in the wreck.

A barge with 5,000 bushels of soy beans aboard sank in Chesapeake Bay in February 1979. Red Cedar set a temporary buoy on the wreck to prevent ships from hitting the uncharted obstruction.

=== Marine environmental protection ===
The Hambrooks Bar Light in the Choptank River was repaired to preserve its historic value by Red Cedar during September 1991.

=== Winter operations ===
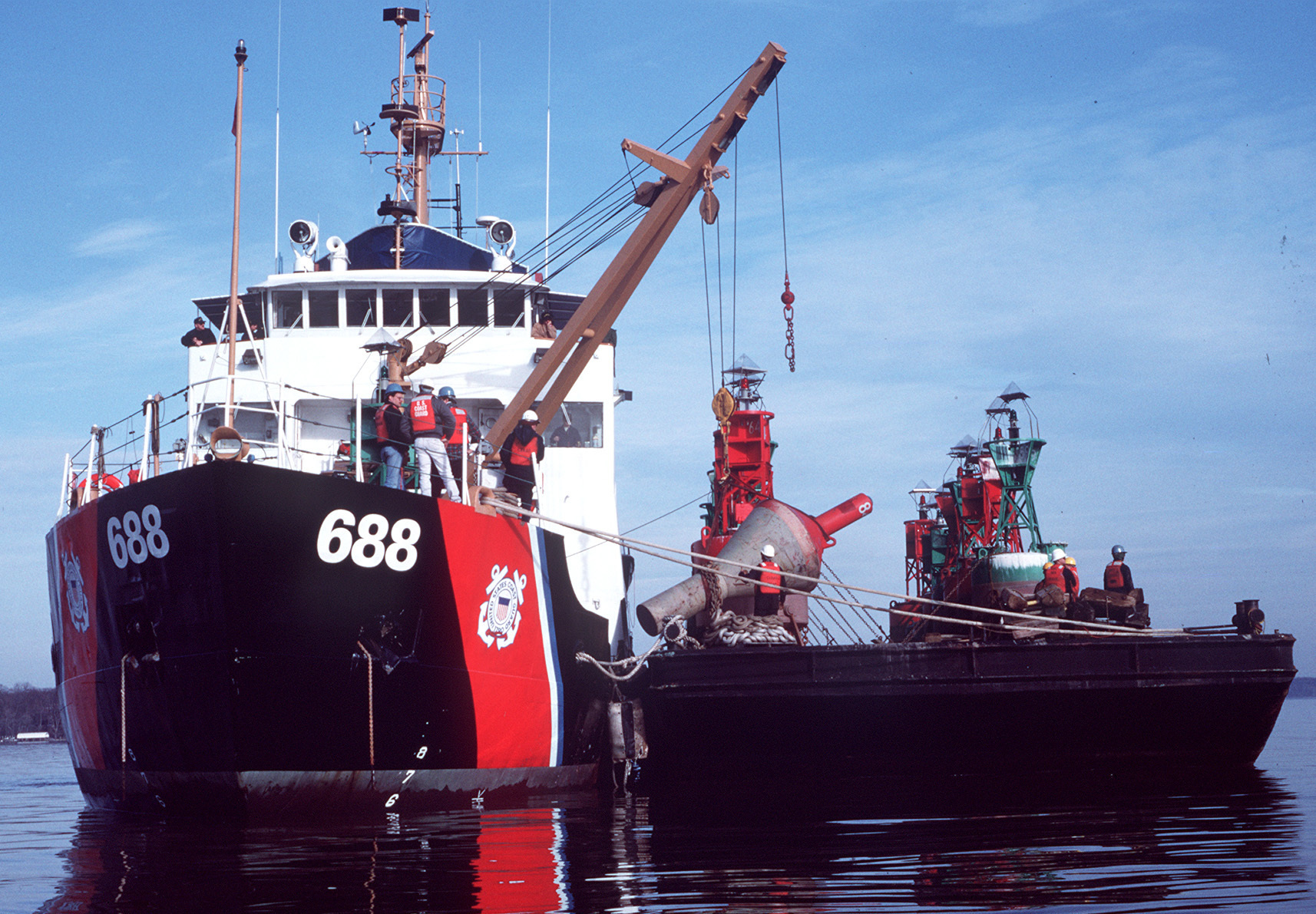
Red Cedar swapping tall summer buoys with sleek Ice-resistant winter buoys in the Potomac River

Red Cedar was used for light icebreaking in Chesapeake Bay and the rivers that emptied into it starting in her first winter afloat. Her icebreaking was particularly significant because a number of coastal communities were dependent on barges for the delivery of heating oil, gasoline, and fuel for power plants. She broke ice on the Delaware, Wicomico, and Nanticoke Rivers. Her icebreaking was sometimes used to free ships that had been frozen in.

Large buoys in freshwater rivers where ice conditions are difficult can be damaged, sunk, or dragged off-station by the movement of the ice. In the fall, Red Cedar replaced 55 such buoys with smaller seasonal buoys which were less susceptible to ice damage. In the spring, she swapped these out for the larger summer buoys.

=== Public engagement ===
The Coast Guard offered tours of Red Cedar on several occasions including:

- Coast Guard open house in August 1986
- Chrysanthemum Festival in New Bern in October 1989
- Dogwood Festival in Salisbury in May 1997, and May 1998

=== Awards and honors ===
Red Cedar earned a Coast Guard Unit Commendation for her icebreaking in January 1977. The ship's efforts to salvage USCGC Cuyahoga earned her a Meritorious Unit Commendation in October 1978. She earned another meritorious unit commendation for removing fishnet stake buoys in Chesapeake Bay in 1993.

=== Decommissioning and transfer ===
Red Cedar was decommissioned on 16 March 1999. She was replaced in Portsmouth by the Keeper-class cutter USCGC Frank Drew. Under the Foreign Assistance Act of 1961, surplus military equipment could be transferred to other countries through the Excess Defense Articles program to support U.S. foreign policy objectives. Red Cedar was transferred to the Argentine Navy through this program after her decommissioning by the U.S. Coast Guard. This transfer was part of a comprehensive program to improve the Argentine Navy's ability to interdict illicit drugs and their precursor chemicals.

== Argentine Navy service ==
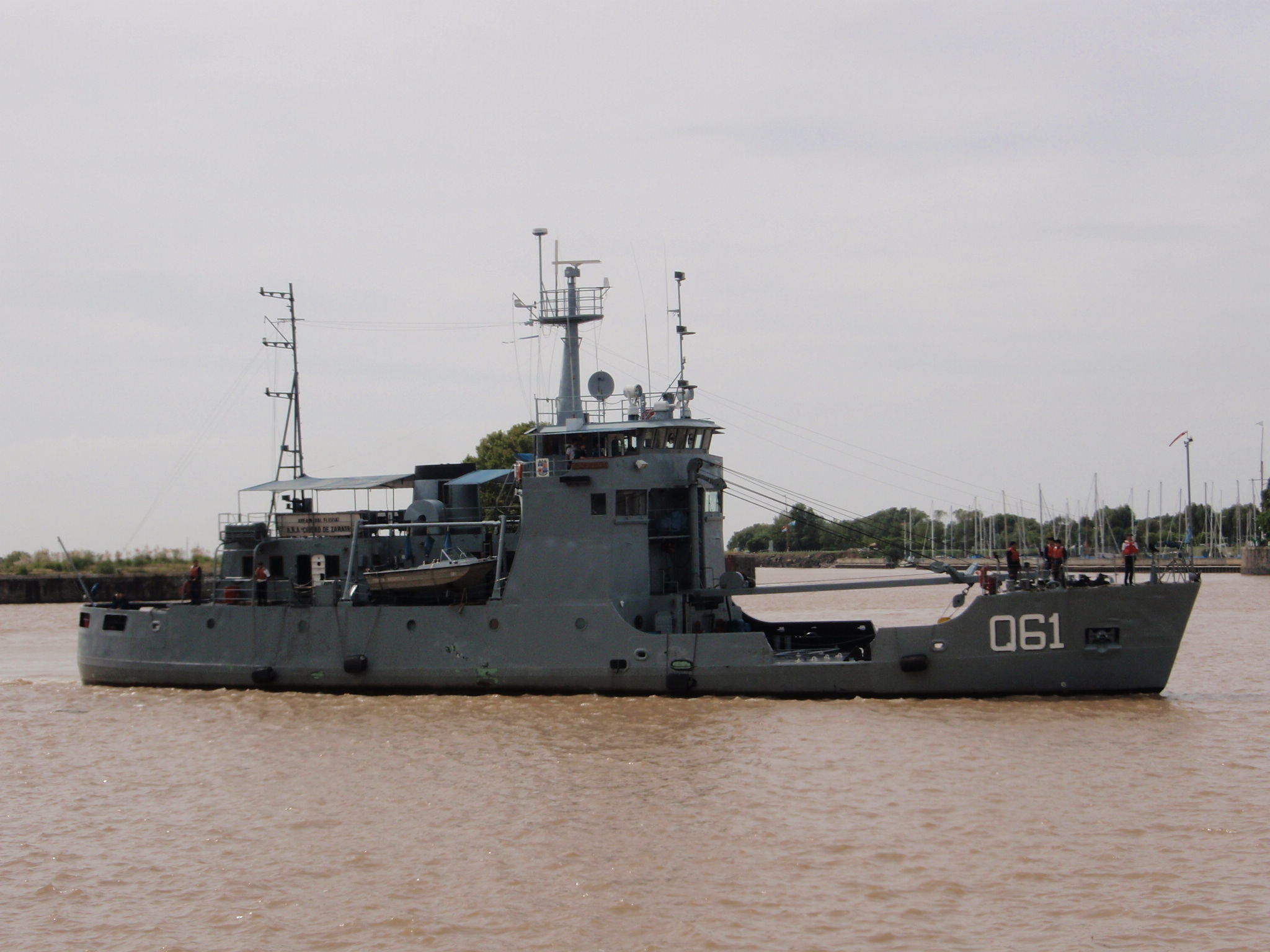
Ciudad de Zárate

On 30 March 1999 the ship was reflagged and became ARA Ciudad de Zárate (Q61). She is assigned to the Escuadrilla de Ríos (River Squadron) and is homeported at the Zarate Naval Base near Buenos Aires. The voyage to her new homeport took 70 days and included port calls in 10 countries.

Ciudad de Zárate is classed as a "multipurpose ship" and has been used to provide health care and food distribution to remote river communities, training not only for the Argentine Navy, but also for the armed forces of Paraguay and Bolivia, and buoy tending, not only in Argentina, but in neighboring Uruguay as well. The ship transports a Marine Infantry Battalion on the river as needed. She has trained with combatant ships to support military operations.

During her community health campaigns, the ship carried two containers on her buoy deck which contained a dental chair, x-ray machine, oxygen, and other equipment. The campaigns provided primary care, dentistry, pediatric, gynecology, urology, cardiology, obstetrics, ophthalmology, and other medical services. Among the places visited were Puerto de Santa Fe, Rosario, Colonia Cano, Puerto Bermejo, Puerto Las Palmas, Isla del Cerrito, Isla Soto, and General Lavalle. The ship conducted these campaigns in multiple years, including 2012, 2018, and 2019.

Ciudad de Zárate was opened for public tours on several occasions including:

- Navy Day in May 2012 in Puerto de Santa Fe
- Posadas port visit in June 2008
- Navy Day in May 2017 in Bella Vista, Corrientes.

In July 2020 Ciudad de Zárate and her sistership, ARA Ciudad de Rosario, transported firefighters to grassland wildfires on islands in the Paraná River Delta.

During the COVID-19 pandemic in 2020, the ship delivered personal protective equipment, and cleaning supplies to remote river communities.
