= USCGC Red Beech =

Red-class buoy tender of the US Coast Guard

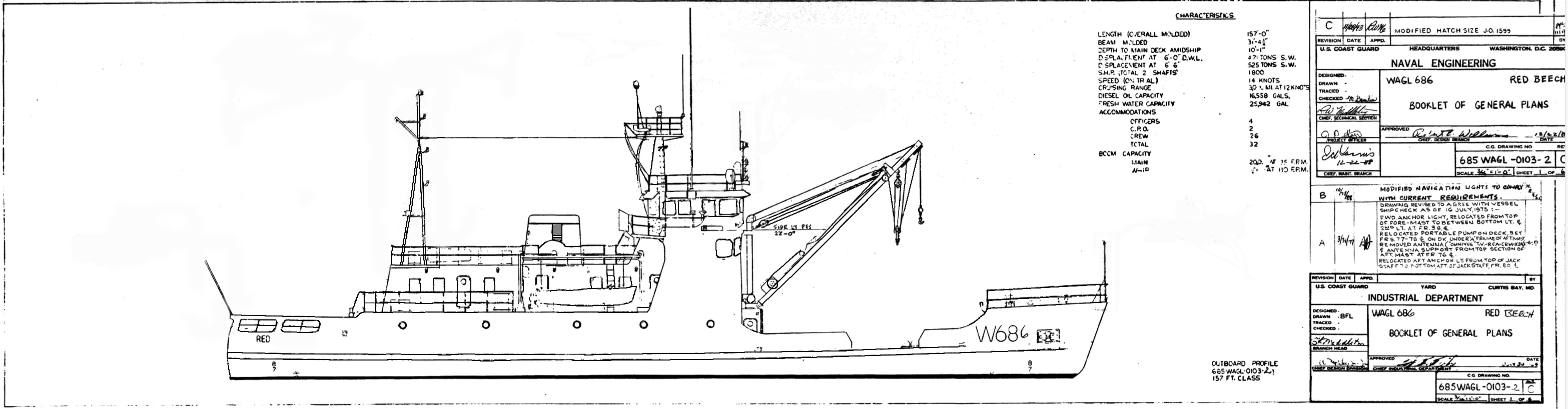
- USCGC Red Beech

History

United States
- Name: Red Beech
- Operator: US Coast Guard
- Builder: US Coast Guard Yard
- Launched: 6 June 1964
- Commissioned: 20 November 1964
- Decommissioned: 18 June 1997
- Identification: Callsign: NJLE
- Fate: Sunk for an artificial reef in 2000

General characteristics
- Type: Red-class buoy tender
- Displacement: 572 long tons (581 t) full load
- Length: 157 ft (47.9 m)
- Beam: 33 ft (10.1 m)
- Draft: 7 ft (2.1 m)
- Installed power: 1,800 hp (1,300 kW)
- Propulsion: 2 × Caterpillar 398A Diesel engines
- Speed: 12.5 knots (23.2 km/h; 14.4 mph)
- Range: 2,450 nautical miles at 10 kn
- Crew: 32 (4 officers, 28 enlisted)

USCGC Red Beech (WLM-686) was a Red-class coastal buoy tender designed, built, owned, and operated by the United States Coast Guard. She was launched in 1964 and homeported at Governors Island, New York. Her primary mission was maintaining 250 aids to navigation along the Hudson River, East River, Raritan River, Kill Van Kull, Arthur Kill, and throughout New York Harbor. Her secondary missions included search and rescue, light icebreaking, law enforcement, and marine environmental protection. Red Beech was initially assigned to the 3rd Coast Guard District, but was later moved to the 1st Coast Guard District when the 3rd was absorbed in a reorganization.

At the end of her Coast Guard career she was sunk off the coast of Ocean City, Maryland as part of an artificial reef.

== Acquisition ==
USCGC Oak (WAGL-239) was built in 1921 for the United States Lighthouse Service. Come the 1960s, she was one of the last Coast Guard buoy tenders propelled by a steam engine. Her machinery was so antiquated that when the ship was decommissioned in 1964 she was transferred to The Smithsonian Institution, which put her boilers and steam engine on display. She was the longest continuously serving vessel in the Coast Guard fleet at the time of her retirement.

Maintaining steam-powered buoy tenders like Oak had become costly and problematic, as spare parts for their engines were no longer available and had to be fabricated. Congress funded Red Beech as a replacement.

== Construction and characteristics ==
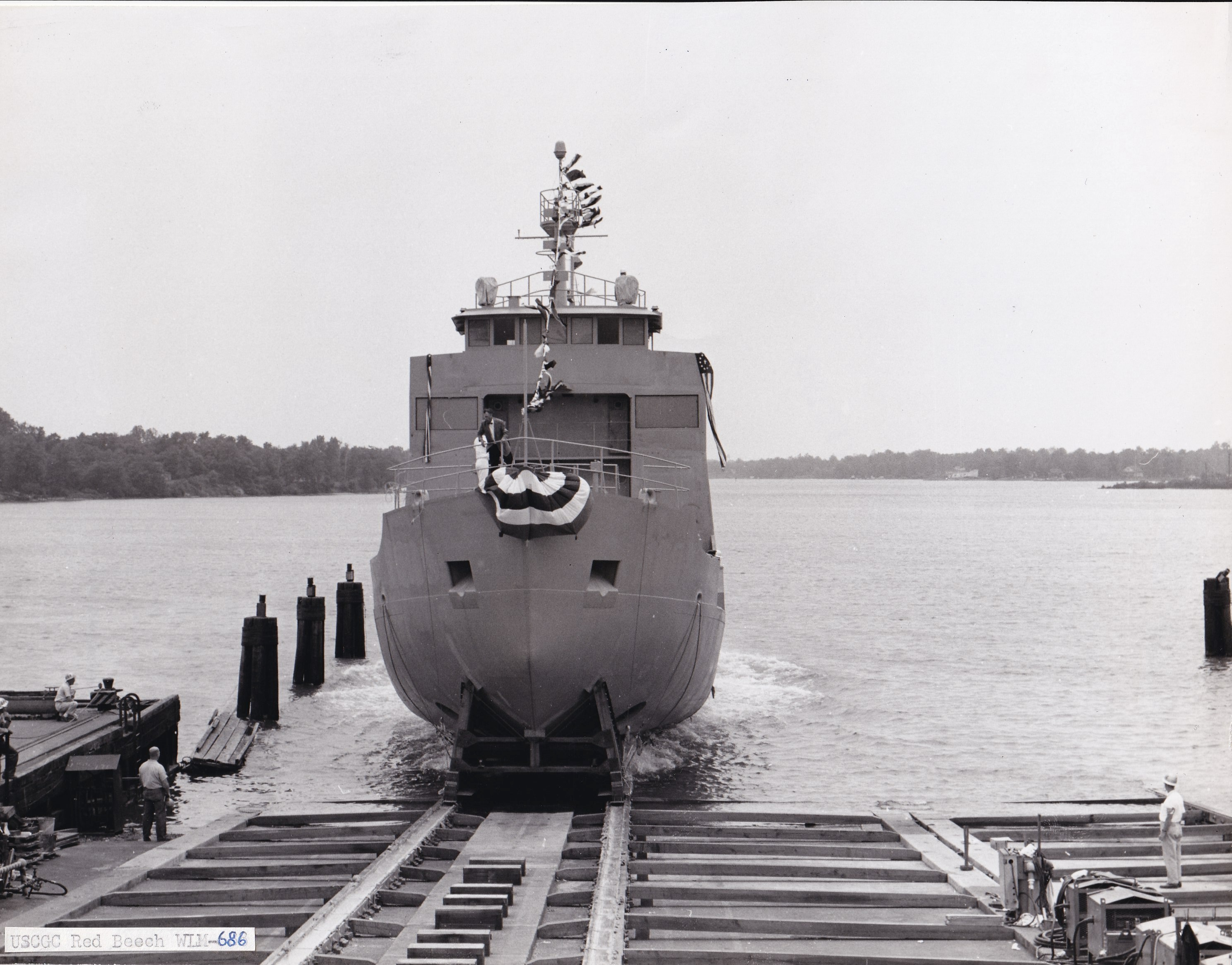
Red Beech launch at the Coast Guard Yard

Red Beech was built at the Coast Guard Yard in Curtis Bay, Maryland. Her keel was laid down on 14 October 1963. She was launched on 6 June 1964. She was sponsored by Helen Columbus, wife of Captain Charles E. Columbus, commander of the Coast Guard Yard. Her initial cost was $2,383,984.

Her hull was built of welded steel plates. The ship was 157 feet (48 m) long overall, with a beam of 33 ft (10 m), and a draft of 7 ft (2.1 m). Her shallow draft and flat bottom was required for her work along the edges of dredged channels, but this hull form made her harder to maneuver and more prone to rolling. Her hull was reinforced for light icebreaking. She displaced 471 tons with a light load, and 572 tons with a full load.

The ship had two Caterpillar D398A 12-cylinder diesel engines rated at 900 horsepower (670 kW) each. These drove two four-bladed controllable-pitch propellers which were 40 inches (1.0 m) in diameter. Red-class ships had a maximum speed of 12.5 knots (23.2 km/h; 14.4 mph). She had a bow thruster for increased maneuverability. This was driven by a power take-off from the starboard propulsion engine.

Red Beech's tanks held 17,620 US gallons (66,700 L; 14,670 imp gal) of diesel fuel. This gave her a range of 2,450 nautical miles (4,540 km; 2,820 mi) at 10 knots (19 km/h; 12 mph), or 2,100 nmi (3,900 km; 2,400 mi) at full speed. There were three engine control stations, two on the bridge wings and one in the pilothouse.

Her buoy deck featured a crane with the ability to lift 10 tons, which could be controlled from two different stations just below the bridge deck. The cranes' hydraulics were driven by a power take-off from the port propulsion engine. Her buoy deck had 1,200 square feet (110 m^{2}) of working space.

The ship had a crew of 4 officers and 28 enlisted men. In 1966 her commanding officer was a lieutenant, her executive officer was a lieutenant, j.g., her first lieutenant was a warrant officer 3, and her engineering officer was a warrant officer 2. Crew quarters were air-conditioned, a notable improvement in comfort at the time.

== Coast Guard service ==
Red Beech was commissioned at the Coast Guard Yard at a ceremony on 20 November 1964. She was assigned to Governors Island, New York, where she replaced USCGC Oak. The bulk of her time was spent at sea tending her buoy fleet or moored, maintaining the ship and training the crew. Maintaining her buoys included verifying that they were in their charted positions, replacing lights and batteries, cleaning off marine growth, and inspecting and replacing their mooring chains and sinkers. On occasion, she was assigned a variety of other missions, as described below.

=== Search and rescue ===
In June 1970, Red Beech recovered a Cessna 150 aircraft which crashed into Long Island Sound and sank off New Rochelle. The pilot was dead at the controls when the plane was raised. It was taken to Fort Totten.

=== Law enforcement ===
In October 1981 the trawler Falcon sank ten miles (16 km) off the New Jersey coast. Recovery of loose bales of hashish in the area led to the dispatch of Red Beech to the site of the wreck with divers from the Coast Guard's Atlantic Strike Team. Over 34,000 pounds (15,000 kg) of hashish was salvaged from the wreck, the second largest hashish seizure in US Customs Service history. The ship's commanding officer during this incident was Lieutenant Robert J. Papp, jr., later Commandant of the Coast Guard.

=== Marine environmental protection ===
On 25 October 1972, a barge owned by Atlantic Richfield was loading gasoline and light fuel oil in Arthur Kill when it exploded and began burning. Red Beech was dispatched among other assets to assess damage to buoys caused by the explosion and to monitor the spill. She was dispatched to other fires and spills in her heavily industrialized service area on several occasions.

The Liberian-flagged tanker Aeolus flooded and sank from a leak in her engine room. She settled to the bottom in 48 feet (15 m) of water about 17 miles (27 km) southeast of New York Harbor. Her main deck and superstructure remained above water. Red Beech was dispatched to the scene on 25 August 1974 with pumps capable of 1,000 US gal (3,800 L; 830 imp gal) per minute to remove the oil aboard before it spilled.

=== Winter operations ===
Red Beech, and several other cutters were used for light icebreaking in the rivers and bays around New York and Baltimore. This was an important mission in that a number of communities relied on heating oil, gasoline, and fuel oil for power plants delivered by barges on these waterways. Her icebreaking was sometimes used to free ships that had been frozen in. In January and February 1978 she broke 48 miles (77 km) of ice in the Hudson River to free eight vessels.

Large buoys placed in freshwater rivers where ice conditions are difficult can be damaged, sunk, or dragged off-station. In the fall, Red Beech replaced 33 such buoys with smaller seasonal buoys which were less susceptible to ice damage. In the spring, she swapped these out for the larger buoys.

=== Public engagement ===
The Coast Guard offered tours of Red Beech on several occasions including:

- Armed Forces week in May 1967
- An open house at the Saugerties Coast Guard station in August 1975
- The Great Cow Harbor Day festival in Northport, New York in September 1993
- American Heritage Festival at Jersey City, New Jersey in October 1995
- Governors Island Ship Visitation in May 1996

== Awards and honors ==
Red Beech earned a Coast Guard Unit Commendation in 1986 for her participation in the Statue of Liberty Centennial Celebration. The ship was awarded the Coast Guard Meritorious Unit Commendation in 1977, 1979, 1981, 1986, and in 1991. The 1977 commendation was for her icebreaking services in lower New York Harbor and in Chesapeake Bay. The 1986 award was for her response to a waterfront fire. The Special Operations Service Ribbon was awarded for her response to the 1993 Storm of the Century and again in 1996 for her security role during the 50th anniversary celebration for the United Nations.

In 1982, Red Beech was deemed the outstanding transportation unit of the United States Coast Guard by the National Defense Transportation Association.

== Decommissioning and sinking ==
Red Beech was decommissioned on 18 June 1997 at Governors Island. She was replaced in New York Harbor by the Keeper-class cutter USCGC Katherine Walker. Red Beech was returned to the Coast Guard Yard where she was cleaned of potentially toxic materials in preparation to be sunk as part of an artificial reef.

She was sunk on 10 June 2000 and became part of the Great Eastern Reef, about 20 miles (32 km) off Ocean City, Maryland.
