= USCGC Red Oak =

Red-class buoy tender of the US Coast Guard

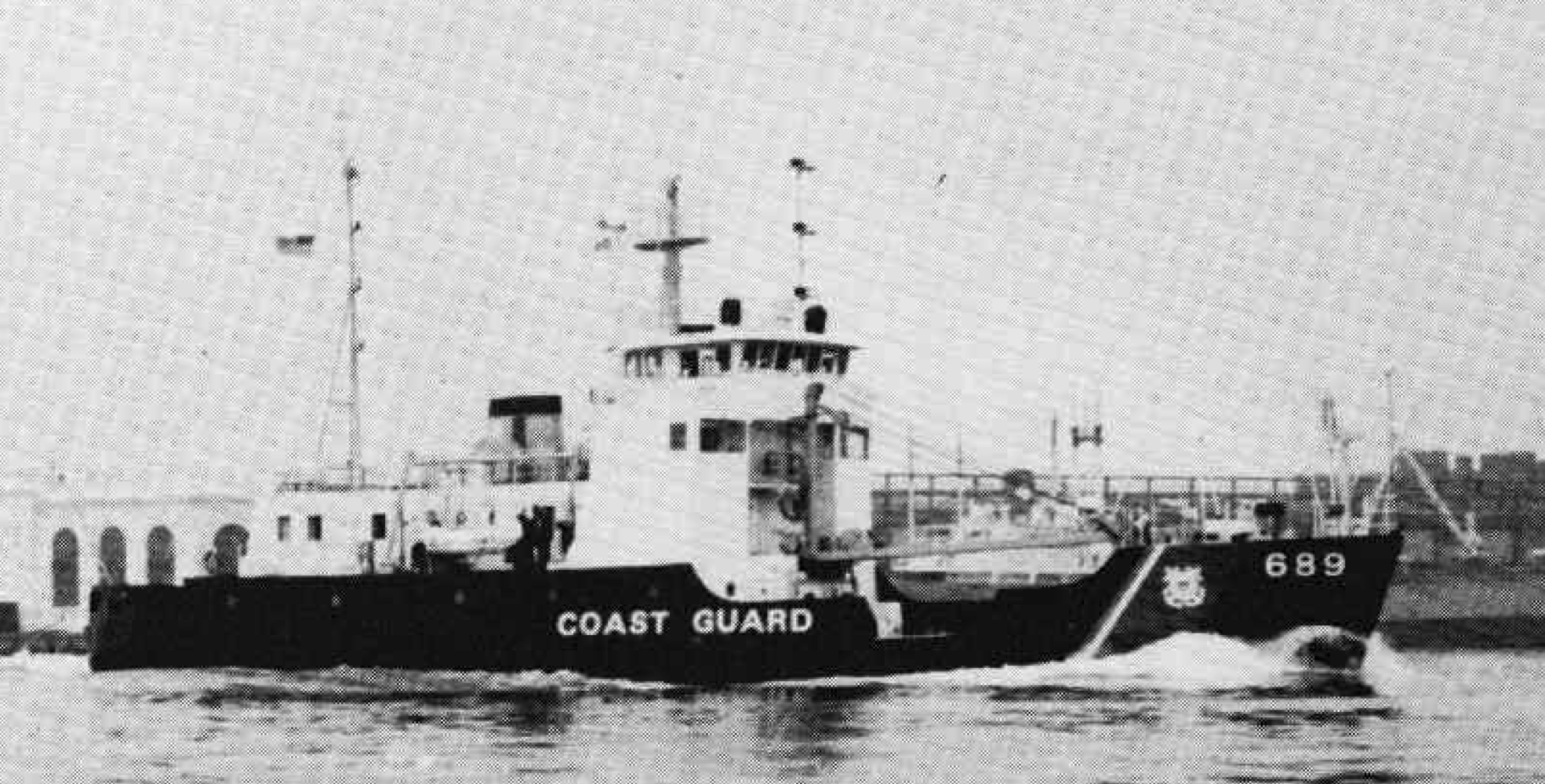
- USCGC Red Oak

History

United States
- Name: Red Oak
- Operator: US Coast Guard
- Builder: US Coast Guard Yard
- Launched: 19 June 1971
- Commissioned: 17 December 1971
- Decommissioned: 28 March 1996
- Identification: Callsign: NPKF
- Fate: Sunk for an artificial reef in 1999

General characteristics
- Type: Red-class buoy tender
- Displacement: 572 long tons (581 t) full load
- Length: 157 ft (47.9 m)
- Beam: 33 ft (10.1 m)
- Draft: 7 ft (2.1 m)
- Installed power: 1,800 hp (1,300 kW)
- Propulsion: 2 × Caterpillar 398A Diesel engines
- Speed: 12.5 knots (23.2 km/h; 14.4 mph)
- Range: 2,450 nautical miles at 10 kn
- Crew: 32 (4 Officers, 28 Enlisted)

USCGC Red Oak (WLM-689) was a Red-class coastal buoy tender designed, built, owned, and operated by the United States Coast Guard. She was launched in 1971 and homeported at Gloucester City, New Jersey until Coast Guard Base Gloucester was closed in 1988. For the remainder of her career she was home-ported in Philadelphia. Her primary mission was maintaining over 300 aids to navigation in the upper Cheasapeake Bay and its tributaries including the Delaware, North East, Chester, Bohemia, Sassafras, and Susquehanna Rivers, and the C&D Canal. She was also responsible for refueling the Brandywine Shoal lighthouse. Her secondary missions included search and rescue, light icebreaking, law enforcement, and marine environmental protection. Red Oak was initially assigned to the 3rd Coast Guard District, but was later moved to the 5th Coast Guard District when the 3rd was absorbed in a reorganization.

At the end of her Coast Guard career she was sunk off the coast of Ocean City, Maryland to form part of an artificial reef.

== Acquisition ==
USCGC Lilac (WAGL-237) was built in 1933 for the United States Lighthouse Service. Come the 1970s, she was the last Coast Guard buoy tender propelled by a steam engine. Maintaining her machinery had become costly and problematic, as spare parts for her engines were no longer available and had to be fabricated. Congress funded $3.1 million for Red Oak as a replacement.

== Construction and characteristics ==
Red Oak was built at the Coast Guard Yard in Curtis Bay, Maryland. Her keel was laid down on 26 October 1970. She was launched on 19 June 1971. She was christened by Doris Hunt, wife of U.S. Representative John E. Hunt. Her initial cost was $3,328,077. She was the fifth and final Red-class ship built.

Her hull was built of welded steel plates. The ship was 157 feet (48 m) long overall, with a beam of 33 feet (10 m), and a draft of 7 feet (2.1 m). Her shallow draft and flat bottom was required for her work along the edges of dredged channels, but this hull form made her harder to maneuver and more prone to rolling. Her hull was reinforced for light icebreaking. She displaced 471 tons with a light load, and 572 tons with a full load.

The ship had two Caterpillar D398A 12-cylinder diesel engines rated at 900 horsepower (670 kW) each. These drove two four-bladed controllable-pitch propellers which were 40 inches (1.0 m) in diameter. Red-class ships had a maximum speed of 12.5 knots (23.2 km/h; 14.4 mph). She had a bow thruster for increased maneuverability. This was driven by a power take-off from the starboard propulsion engine.

Red Oak's tanks held 17,620 US gallons (66,700 L; 14,670 imp gal) of diesel fuel. This gave her a range of 2,450 nautical miles (4,540 km; 2,820 mi) at 10 knots (19 km/h; 12 mph), or 2,100 nmi (3,900 km; 2,400 mi) at full speed. There were three engine control stations, two on the bridge wings and one in the pilothouse.

Her buoy deck featured a crane with the ability to lift 10 tons, which could be controlled from two different stations just below the bridge deck. The cranes' hydraulics were driven by a power take-off from the port propulsion engine. Her buoy deck had 1,200 square feet (110 m^{2}) of working space.

The ship had a crew of 4 officers and 28 enlisted men. She was commanded by a lieutenant, with a lieutenant (j.g.) as an executive officer. Crew quarters were air-conditioned, a notable improvement in comfort at the time.

== Coast Guard service ==
Red Oak was commissioned on 17 December 1971 at the Coast Guard Yard. She reached her new homeport of Gloucester City on 21 December 1971 where she replaced USCGC Lilac. The bulk of her time was spent at sea tending her buoy fleet or moored, maintaining the ship and training the crew. Maintaining her buoys included verifying that they were in their charted positions, replacing lights and batteries, cleaning off marine growth and bird guano, and inspecting and replacing their mooring chains and sinkers. On occasion, she was assigned a variety of other missions, as described below.

=== Search and rescue ===
On 23 January 1977, Red Oak was returning to her base after tending her buoys. She spotted two teenage boys who were floating in the Delaware River on an ice floe. She rescued the boys and returned them to Gloucester City, where they received medical care.

A Piper Seneca cargo plane crashed on approach to Philadelphia International Airport on 3 April 1979. Red Oak recovered the plane and returned it to Gloucester City for a National Transportation Safety Board investigation.

=== Security ===
Red Oak helped maintain a security zone around hydroplane races which were part of the "River Spectacular" celebration on the Delaware River in August 1986.

=== Marine environmental protection ===
On 20 March 1978, a barge loading JP-4 jet fuel in Delaware City exploded and caught fire. Red Oak responded to the scene and pumped chemical foam on the flames hoping to suppress the fire and keep the barge from breaking up and spilling its cargo into the waterway. The ship acted as the on-scene commander, directing the firefighting and rescue efforts of ten vessels. She was awarded the Coast Guard Unit Commendation for this incident.

=== Winter operations ===
Red Oak was used for light icebreaking in the Delaware River. This was an important mission in that a number of communities relied on heating oil, gasoline, and fuel oil for power plants delivered by barges on these waterways. Her icebreaking was sometimes used to free ships that had been frozen in. On one day during January 1990, she freed seven ships that had been stranded in the ice. In January 1994 Red Oak was disabled when ice punctured a keel cooler.

Large buoys placed in freshwater rivers where ice conditions are difficult can be damaged, sunk, or dragged off-station by the movement of the ice. In the fall, Red Oak replaced 64 such buoys with smaller seasonal buoys which were less susceptible to ice damage. In the spring, she swapped these out for the larger summer buoys.

=== Public engagement ===
The Coast Guard offered tours of Red Oak on several occasions including:

- Coast Guard open house at Gloucester City in May 1973
- Safe boating Day at Gloucester City in June 1978
- National Maritime Week celebration at Penn's Landing in Philadelphia in May 1981, and June 1994
- 200th anniversary of the Coast Guard celebration in June 1990
- Armed Forces Weekend at Penn's Landing in Philadelphia in May 1993

== Awards and honors ==
Red Oak earned a Coast Guard Unit Commendation in 1978 for her firefighting and rescue operations at a jet fuel fire in Delaware City. The ship earned meritorious unit commendations in 1975, 1977, 1979, 1982. Her 1975 commendation arose from her response to a massive fire and oil spill on the Delaware River when the Liberian tanker Corinthos was rammed by the chemical tanker Edgar M. Queeny. The 1977 award was for her efforts to keep the Delaware River navigable despite difficult ice conditions.

== Decommissioning and sinking ==
Red Oak was decommissioned at a ceremony in Philadelphia on 28 March 1996. Her 35-man crew transferred to a sister ship, USCGC Red Wood, which replaced Red Oak in Philadelphia.

Red Oak was sunk on 13 September 1999 approximately nine miles (14 km) southeast of Cape May, New Jersey to form part of an artificial reef. She lies in 65 feet (20 m) of water at 38° 53.13' N, 74° 81.998' W.
