= Red-class cutter =

Class of buoy tenders of the United States Coast Guard

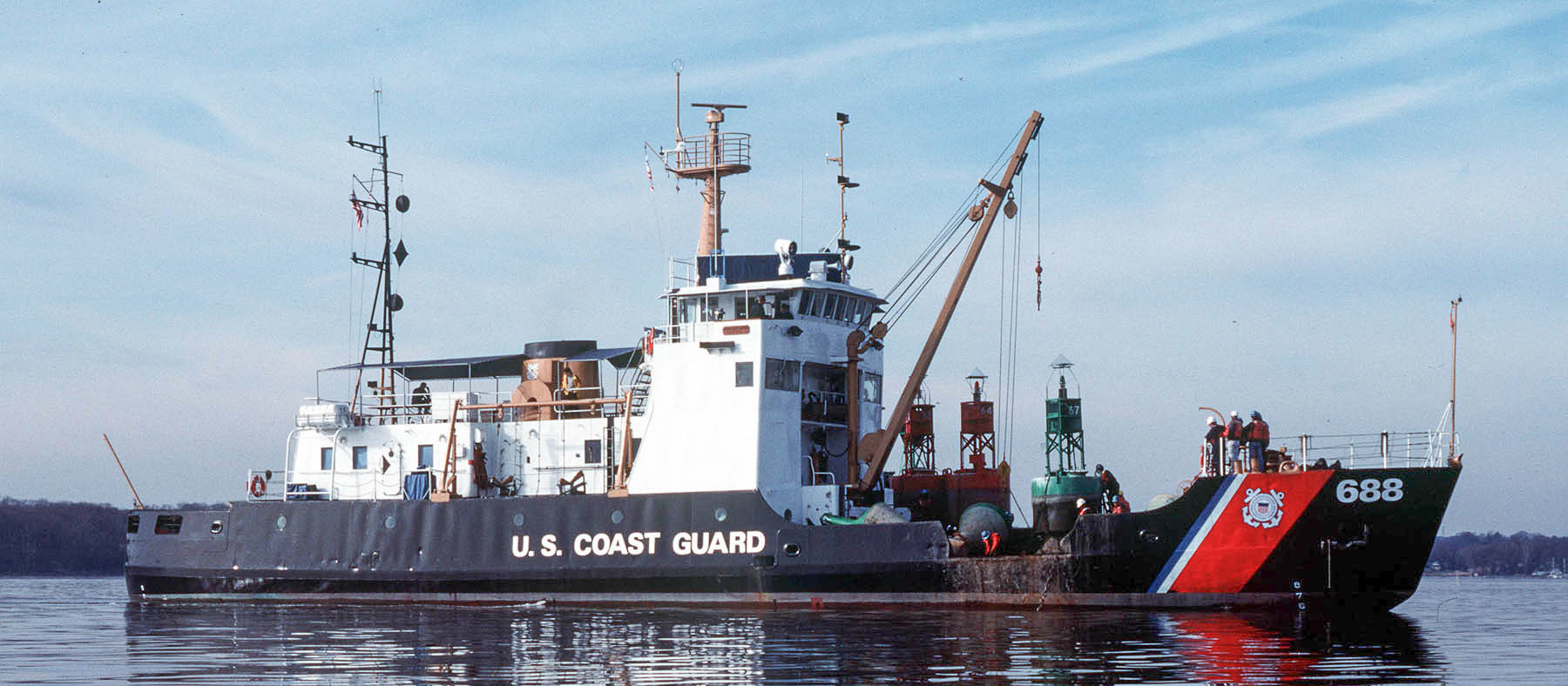
- USCGC Red Cedar

Class overview
- Name: Red class
- Builders: U.S. Coast Guard Yard
- Operators: United States Coast Guard; Argentine Navy
- Succeeded by: Keeper class
- Built: 1964–1971
- In commission: 1964–1999

General characteristics
- Type: Buoy tender
- Displacement: 572 t (563 long tons) full load
- Length: 157 ft 10 in (48.11 m)
- Beam: 33 ft 0 in (10.06 m)
- Draft: 7 ft (2.1 m)
- Installed power: 1,800 bhp (1,300 kW)
- Propulsion: 2 × Caterpillar 398A Diesel engines
- Speed: 12.5 kn (23.2 km/h; 14.4 mph)
- Range: 2,450 nmi (4,540 km; 2,820 mi) at 10 kn (19 km/h; 12 mph)
- Complement: 4 officers, 28 enlisted

The Red class consisted of five coastal buoy tenders designed, built, owned, and operated by the United States Coast Guard. This was the first new class of buoy tenders built after World War II. It was designed to work in coastal waterways and the major rivers which fed them such as New York Harbor, Chesapeake Bay, and San Francisco Bay. Their primary mission was maintaining aids to navigation, with secondary missions of search and rescue, light icebreaking, law enforcement, and marine environmental protection.

At the end of their Coast Guard careers, two of the ships were sunk off the New Jersey coast as part of artificial reefs. The three others were transferred to the Argentine Navy, where they remain in service.

== Origin and acquisition ==
Of the 26 coastal buoy tenders in the Coast Guard fleet in 1964, 11 of them were judged to be obsolete. Nonetheless, Congress only approved funding to replace the most outdated ships, and even then only on the basis that their replacements would save money due to lower maintenance and smaller crews.

Red Wood and Red Beech replaced two sister ships, steam-engine-powered buoy tenders, USCGC Hawthorne and USCGC Oak. The latter was the longest continuously serving vessel in the Coast Guard fleet at the time of her retirement.

The Coast Guard's FY 1963 budget included $3 million to fund Red Birch, which was described to Congress as a replacement for USCGC Hawthorne. Once built, however, she replaced USCGC Columbine in San Francisco.

In its FY 1969 budget request, the Coast Guard sought $2.5 million for a Red-class cutter to replace two older buoy tenders in the Chesapeake Bay and Portsmouth, Virginia area. Congress approved the funding for what became Red Cedar.

The Coast Guard received $3.1 million in its FY 1970 budget for Red Oak to replace USCGC Lilac, which was 37 years old at the time. Lilac was the last Coast Guard buoy tender to be propelled by a steam engine. Spare parts were largely unavailable and maintenance was costly and difficult.

== Construction and characteristics ==
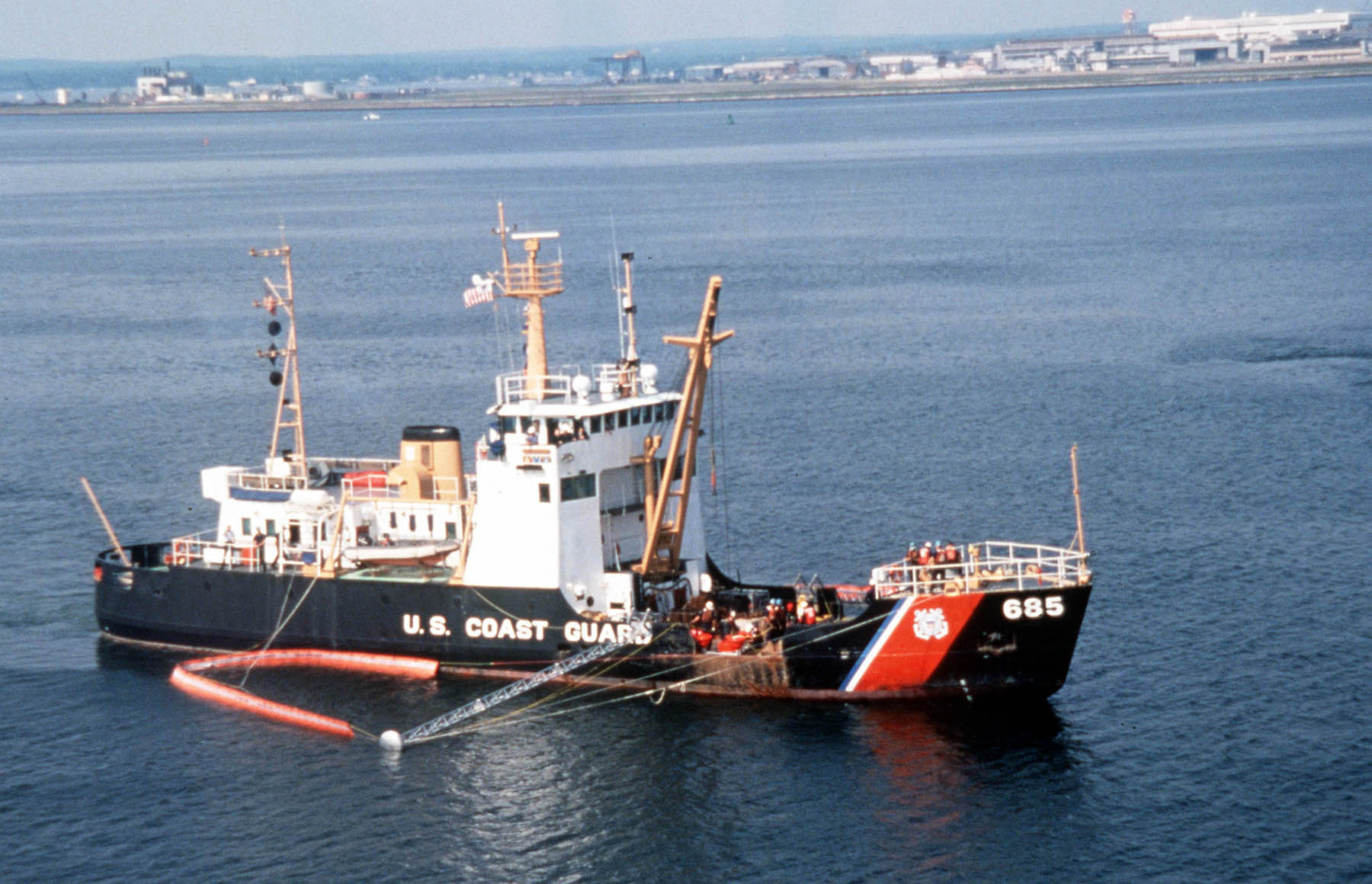
Red Wood skimming an oil spill near Philadelphia

All five ships of the class were built at the Coast Guard Yard in Curtis Bay, Maryland. Their hulls were built of welded steel plates. The ships were 157 feet (48 m) long overall, with a beam of 33 feet (10 m), and a draft of 7 feet (2.1 m). Their shallow draft and flat bottoms were required for their work along the edges of dredged channels, but this hull form made them harder to maneuver and more prone to rolling. Their hulls were reinforced for light icebreaking. They displaced 471 tons with a light load, and 572 tons with a full load.

The ships had two Caterpillar 398A diesel engines rated at 900 horsepower (670 kW) each. These drove two four-bladed controllable-pitch propellers which were 40 inches (1.0 m) in diameter. Red-class ships had a maximum speed of 12.5 knots (23.2 km/h; 14.4 mph). They had a bow thruster for increased maneuverability. This was driven by a power take-off from the starboard propulsion engine.

Their tanks held 17,620 US gallons (66,700 L; 14,670 imp gal) of diesel fuel. This gave them a range of 2,450 nautical miles (4,540 km; 2,820 mi) at 10 knots (19 km/h; 12 mph), or 2,100 nmi (3,900 km; 2,400 mi) at full speed. There were three engine control stations, two on the bridge wings and one in the pilothouse.

Their buoy deck featured a crane with the ability to lift 10 tons, which could be controlled from two different stations just below the bridge deck. The cranes' hydraulics were driven by a power take-off from the port propulsion engine. The buoy deck had 1,200 square feet (110 m^{2}) of working space.

The ships were crewed by 4 officers and 28 enlisted men. Crew quarters were air-conditioned, a notable improvement in comfort at the time.

== Ships in the Red class ==
Hull no.	Name	Laid down	Launched	Commissioned	Decommissioned	Replaced	Fate
WLM-685	Red Wood	1 July 1963	4 April 1964	4 August 1964	30 June 1999	USCGC Hawthorne	Transferred to Argentine Navy. Commissioned as ARA Ciudad de Rosario.
WLM-686	Red Beech	14 October 1963	6 June 1964	20 November 1964	18 June 1997	USCGC Oak	Sunk on 10 June 2000 as an artificial reef off Ocean City, Maryland
WLM-687	Red Birch	6 July 1964	19 February 1965	7 June 1965	9 June 1998	USCGC Columbine	Transferred to Argentine Navy. Commissioned as ARA Punta Alta.
WLM-688	Red Cedar	1 July 1969	1 August 1970	18 December 1970	16 March 1999		Transferred to Argentine Navy. Commissioned as ARA Ciudad de Zárate.
WLM-689	Red Oak	26 October 1970	1 July 1971	17 December 1971	28 March 1996	USCGC Lilac	Sunk on 13 September 1999 as an artificial reef off Cape May, New Jersey

== Argentine service ==
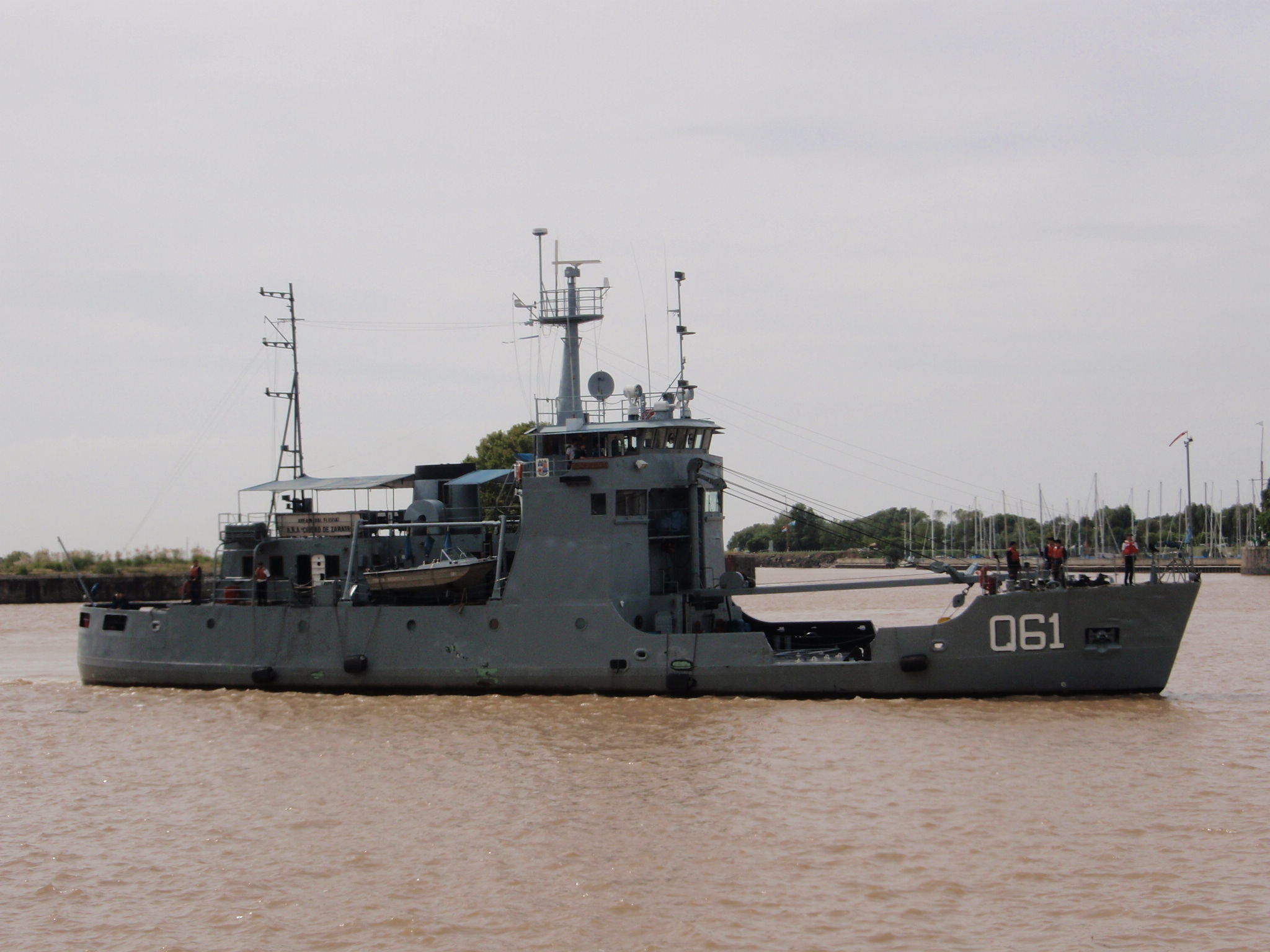
ARA Ciudad de Zárate, ex Red Cedar

Under the Foreign Assistance Act of 1961, surplus military equipment could be transferred to other countries through the Excess Defense Articles program to support U.S. foreign policy objectives. Red Wood, Red Birch, and Red Cedar were transferred to the Argentine Navy through this program, after their decommissioning by the U.S. Coast Guard. These transfers were part of a comprehensive program to improve the Argentine Navy's ability to interdict drugs and their precursor chemicals.

The three ships remain in service as of 2023, and continue to execute a variety of missions.
