= USCGC Red Birch =

Red-class buoy tender of the US Coast Guard

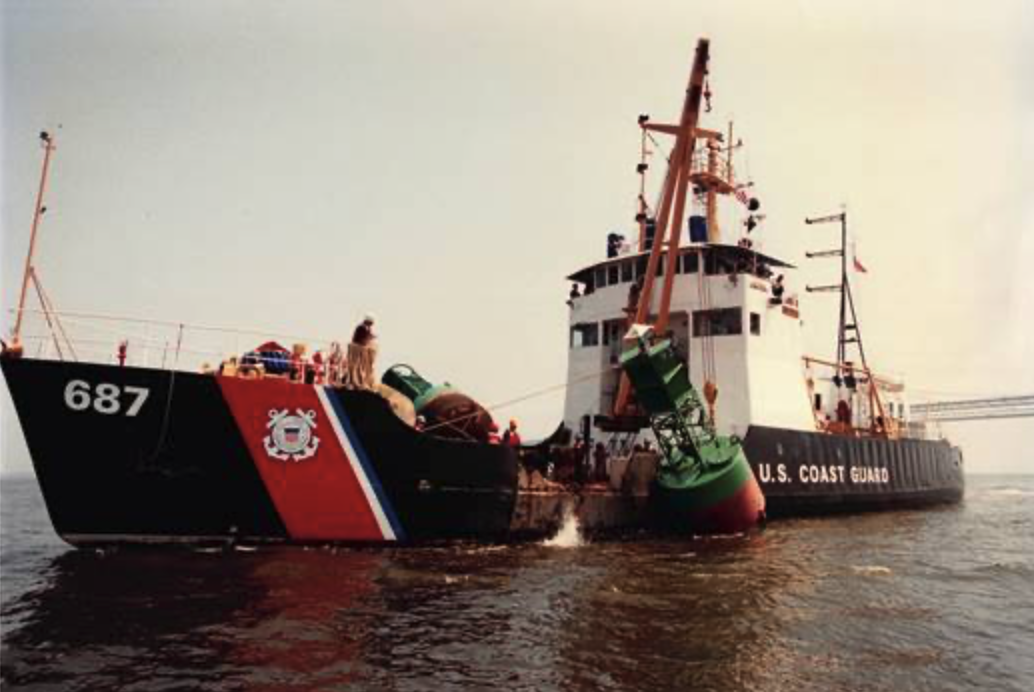
- USCGC Red Birch

History

United States
- Name: Red Birch
- Operator: US Coast Guard
- Builder: US Coast Guard Yard
- Launched: 19 February 1965
- Commissioned: 17 September 1965
- Decommissioned: 12 June 1998
- Identification: Callsign: NGFH
- Fate: Transferred to Argentia in 1999

Argentina
- Name: Punta Alta
- Operator: Argentine Navy
- Commissioned: 30 May 2000
- Identification: Callsign: LOBX; MMSI number: 701816000
- Status: Active

General characteristics
- Class & type: Red-class buoy tender
- Displacement: 572 long tons (581 t) full load
- Length: 157 ft (47.9 m)
- Beam: 33 ft (10.1 m)
- Draft: 7 ft (2.1 m)
- Installed power: 1,800 hp (1,300 kW)
- Propulsion: 2 × Caterpillar 398A diesel engines
- Speed: 12.5 knots (23.2 km/h; 14.4 mph)
- Range: 2,450 nmi (4,540 km; 2,820 mi) at 10 kn (19 km/h; 12 mph)
- Crew: 37 (6 officers, 31 enlisted)

USCGC Red Birch (WLM-687) is a Red-class coastal buoy tender that was designed, built, owned, and operated by the United States Coast Guard. She was launched in 1965 and initially homeported at San Francisco. Her primary mission was maintaining 160 aids to navigation in San Francisco, San Pablo, and Suisun Bays, and in the San Joaquin River. Red Birch also brought supplies to the Farallon Island lighthouse. In 1976 the Coast Guard reassigned her to Baltimore, Maryland, where she spent the rest of her career. There she maintained over 300 aids to navigation including several lighthouses. Her secondary missions included search and rescue, light icebreaking, law enforcement, and marine environmental protection.

At the end of her Coast Guard career she was transferred to the Argentine Navy, which renamed her ARA Punta Alta. She remains in active service as a buoy tender in Bahia Blanca.

== Construction and characteristics ==
Red Birch was built at the Coast Guard Yard in Curtis Bay, Maryland. Her keel was laid down on 6 July 1964. She was launched on 19 February 1965. The ship was christened by Mrs. William Mailliard, wife of U.S. Representative William S. Mailliard. He was the ranking Republican member of the United States House Committee on Merchant Marine and Fisheries, which had jurisdiction over the Coast Guard budget. His California district included waterways which would be serviced by the new cutter. Red Birch's initial cost was $2,181,506. She was the third Red-class ship built.

Her hull was built of welded steel plates. The ship was 157 feet (48 m) long overall, with a beam of 33 feet (10 m), and a draft of 7 feet (2.1 m). Her shallow draft and flat bottom was required for her work along the edges of dredged channels, but this hull form made her harder to maneuver and more prone to rolling. Her hull was reinforced for light icebreaking. She displaced 471 tons with a light load, and 572 tons with a full load.

The ship had two Caterpillar D398A 12-cylinder diesel engines rated at 900 horsepower (670 kW) each. These drove two four-bladed controllable-pitch propellers which were 40 inches (1.0 m) in diameter. Red-class ships had a maximum speed of 12.5 knots (23.2 km/h; 14.4 mph). She had a bow thruster for increased maneuverability. This was driven by a power take-off from the starboard propulsion engine.

Red Birch's tanks held 17,620 U.S. gallons (66,700 L) of diesel fuel. This gave her a range of 2,450 nautical miles (4,540 km; 2,820 mi) at 10 knots (19 km/h; 12 mph), or 2,100 nmi (3,900 km; 2,400 mi) at full speed. There were three engine control stations, two on the bridge wings and one in the pilothouse.

Her buoy deck featured a crane with the ability to lift 10 tons, which could be controlled from two different stations just below the bridge deck. The cranes' hydraulics were driven by a power take-off from the port propulsion engine. Her buoy deck had 1,200 square feet (110 m^{2}) of working space.

The ship had a crew of 6 officers and 31 enlisted sailors. Crew quarters were air-conditioned, a notable improvement in comfort at the time.

== U.S. Coast Guard service ==
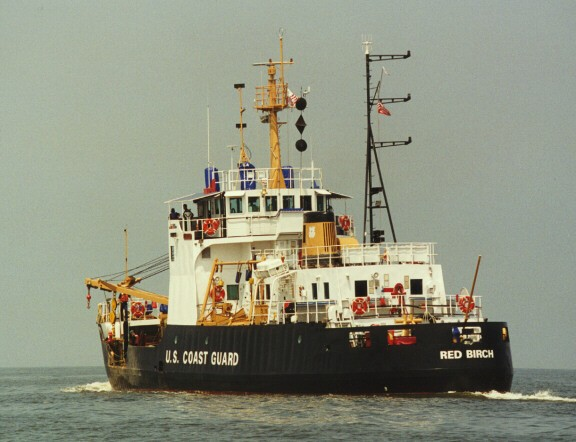
USCGC Red Birch

Red Birch was placed in "commission, special" status at a ceremony at the Coast Guard Yard on 7 June 1965. Rear Admiral Joseph Scullion, Comptroller of the Coast Guard, was the featured speaker at the event. Red Birch sailed from Curtis Bay to San Francisco through the Panama Canal. She reached her new homeport of San Francisco on 26 July 1965. She was based at the Coast Guard base on Yerba Buena Island in San Francisco Bay. She replaced USCGC Columbine there. She was placed in full commission at a ceremony on 17 September 1965.

During her years in San Francisco, a number of the floating buoys in the shallow parts of Red Birch's area were replaced by fixed marks. This reduced the need for a vessel of her capabilities. On 1 June 1976, her homeport was officially changed to Baltimore, Maryland.

The bulk of her time was spent at sea tending her buoy fleet and a number of lighthouses, or moored, maintaining the ship and training the crew. Maintaining her buoys included verifying that they were in their charted positions, replacing lights and batteries, cleaning off marine growth and bird guano, and inspecting and replacing their mooring chains and sinkers.

In 1979, Red Birch had the honor to set the "Star-Spangled Buoy" which marked the spot where Francis Scott Key observed the bombardment of Fort McHenry which inspired the Star-Spangled Banner. She repeated this job in May 1998 as her last mission before she was decommissioned.

On occasion, she was assigned a variety of other missions, as described below.

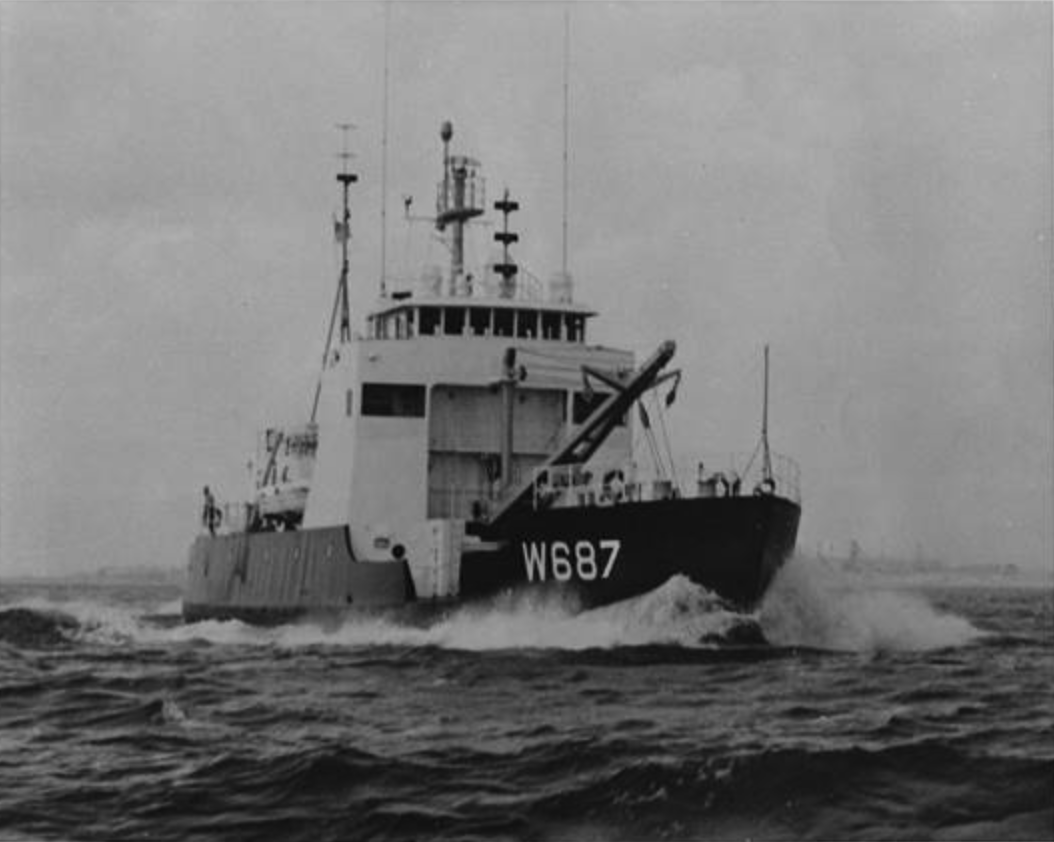
Red Birch underway

=== Search and rescue ===
On 1 October 1965, the freighter Louisiana Maru and the train ferry Las Palmas collided east of Treasure Island. Red Birch went to the accident scene to escort the ships back to port.

In November 1967, Red Birch was dispatched to a collision off Martinez, California between S.S. Vanderbilt Victory, and S.S. Columbia.

Red Birch recovered the bodies of two men who drowned when their boat capsized in San Francisco Bay in December 1972.

Red Birch recovered a car that broke through a barrier on the Antioch Bridge and sank to the bottom of the San Joaquin River in 1972. The driver was not found.

A US Navy Huey helicopter crashed in San Francisco Bay in March 1976. Red Birch used her 10-ton crane to recover the wreckage from the bottom.

=== Marine environmental protection ===
The Arizona Standard and Oregon Standard, two tankers owned by Standard Oil of California, collided in San Francisco Bay on 18 January 1971. Red Birch was dispatched to the scene and reported that over 200,000 gallons of bunker oil had already spilled into the bay from Oregon Standard. Red Birch brought containment boom to the scene.

USCGC Walnut and Red Birch tested a High-Seas Oil Containment Barrier off Point Conception in 1972. 16,000 gallons of soybean oil were skimmed off the ocean in two-and-a-half hours.

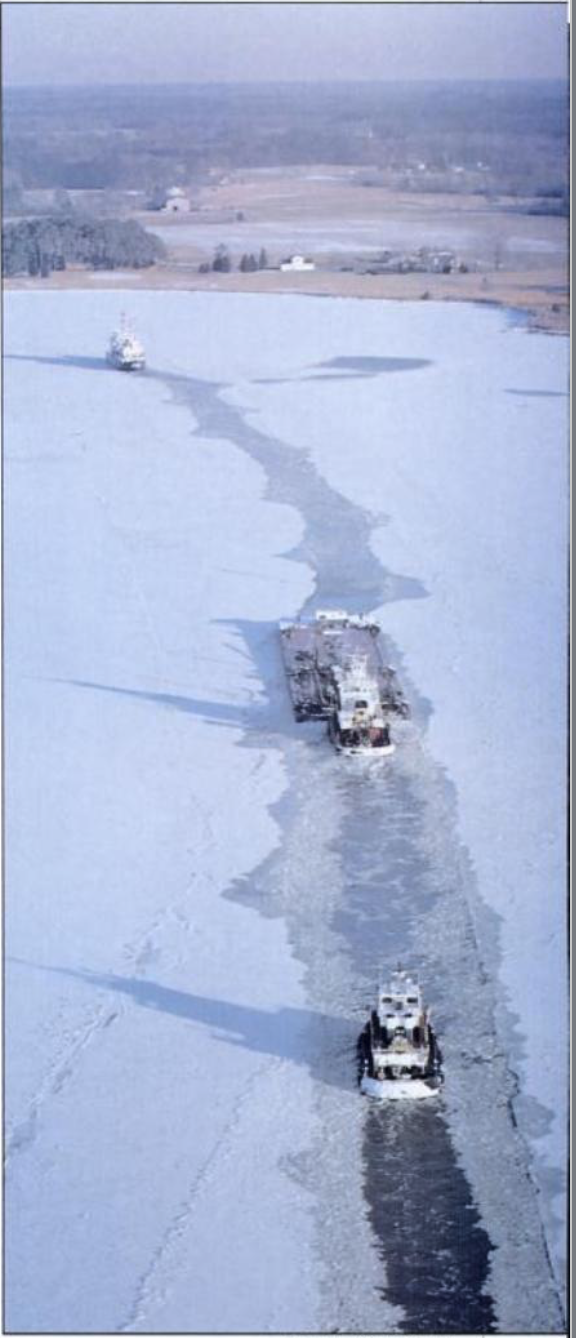
Red Birch (top left) breaks ice on the Wicomico River in 1994 for a heating oil barge bound for Salisbury, Maryland

=== Winter operations ===
Red Birch was used for light icebreaking in the James, Nanticoke, and Wicomico Rivers. This was an important mission in that a number of communities relied on heating oil, gasoline, and fuel oil for power plants delivered by barges on these waterways. The Surry nuclear power plant was shut down briefly in January 1977 when the James River, its source for cooling water, froze. Red Birch was sent to break up the ice so the plant could restart its operations. Her icebreaking was sometimes used to free ships that had been frozen in.

Large buoys in freshwater rivers where ice conditions are difficult can be damaged, sunk, or dragged off-station by the movement of the ice. In the fall, Red Birch replaced 94 such buoys with smaller seasonal buoys which were less susceptible to ice damage. In the spring, she swapped these out for the larger summer buoys.

=== Public engagement ===
The Coast Guard offered tours of Red Birch on several occasions including:

- Armed Forces Day open house in May 1967
- "Operation Coast Guard 1982" in Baltimore's inner harbor.
- Port of Baltimore Festival in 1989
- Coast Guard Bicentennial in 1990
- Maritime Festival at Havre de Grace in 1996
- Open House in Chesapeake City in 1997
- Open House at the Naval Academy in 1998

In October 1972, Red Birch was host to Princess Christina of the Swedish royal family for a San Francisco Bay tour.

=== Awards and honors ===
Red Birch earned a Meritorious Unit Commendation in 1976 and another for her icebreaking during January 1977.

=== Decommissioning and transfer ===
Red Birch was decommissioned on 12 June 1998. She was replaced in Baltimore by the Keeper-class cutter USCGC James Rankin. Under the Foreign Assistance Act of 1961, surplus military equipment could be transferred to other countries through the Excess Defense Articles program to support U.S. foreign policy objectives. Red Birch was transferred to the Argentine Navy through this program after her decommissioning by the U.S. Coast Guard. This transfer was part of a comprehensive program to improve the Argentine Navy's ability to interdict illicit drugs and their precursor chemicals.

== Argentine Navy service ==
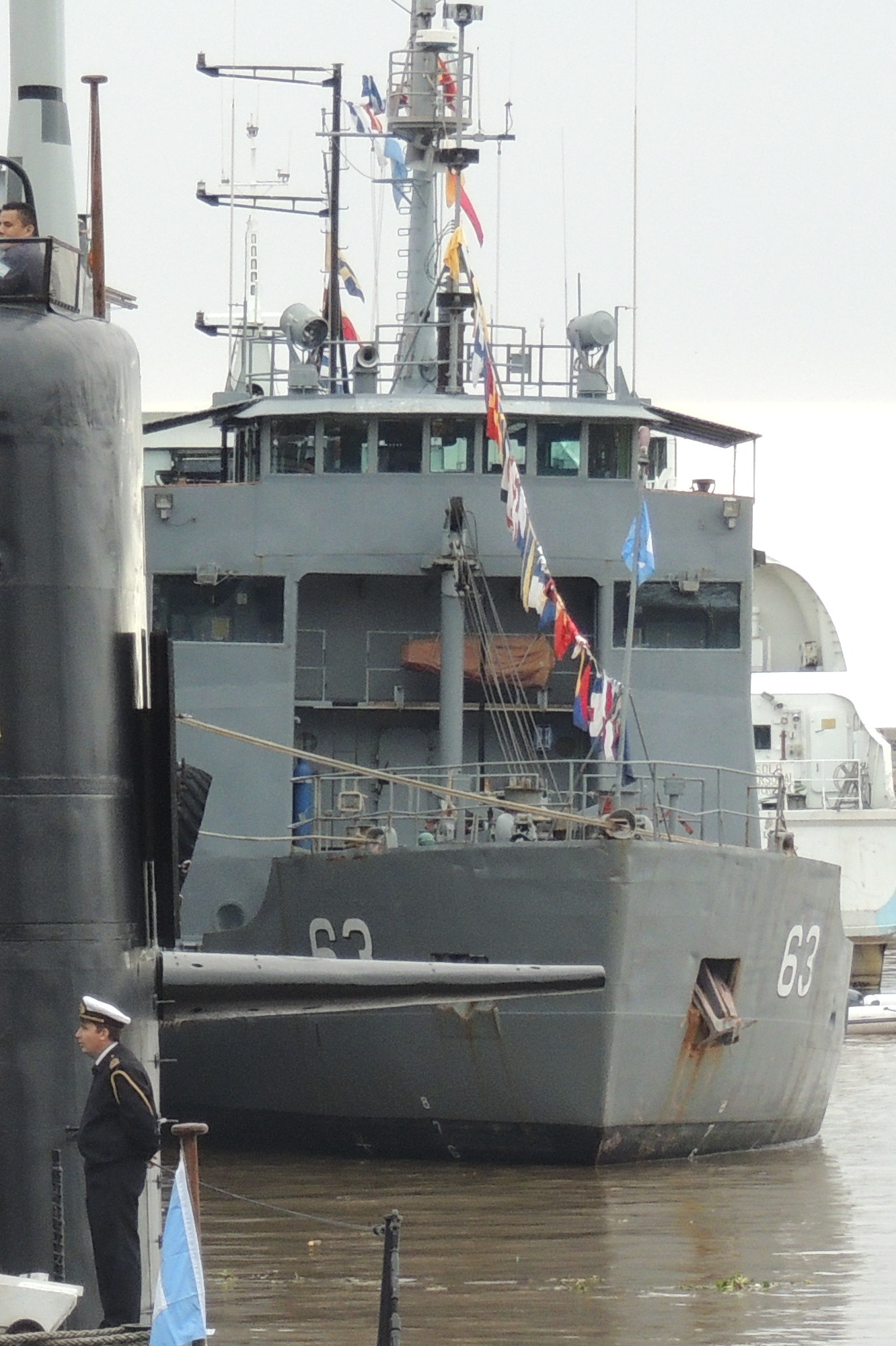
ARA Punta Alta

On 9 July 1998, at a ceremony at Curtis Bay, the ship was reflagged and became ARA Punta Alta (Q63). On 30 May 2000 she commenced active duty with the Argentine Navy. She is homeported at the Puerto Belgrano Naval Base. Punta Alta is classed as a "multipurpose ship." Her primary mission is to maintain approximately 75 buoys that mark the channel to the ports of Bahia Blanca, but she has been called upon for a number of different missions.

In 2014 an RBS 70 surface to air missile was fired from Punta Alta as part of a training exercise. Punta Alta trained with a number of other Argentine Navy ships in preparation for the summer 2022-23 Antarctic campaign.
