= USCGC Red Wood =

Red-class buoy tender of the US Coast Guard

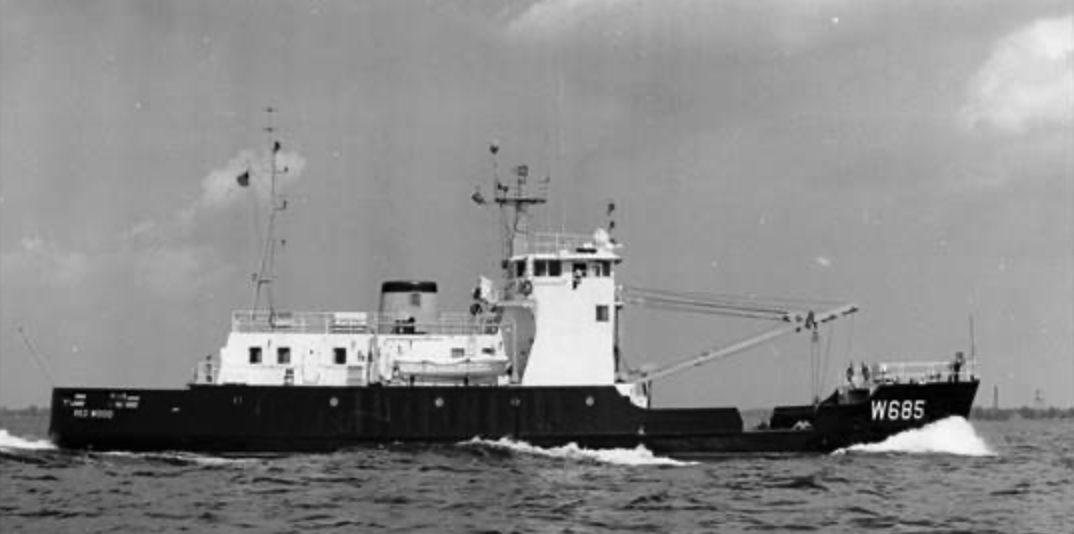
- USCGC Red Wood

History

United States
- Name: Red Oak
- Operator: US Coast Guard
- Builder: United States Coast Guard Yard
- Launched: 4 April 1964
- Commissioned: 4 August 1964
- Decommissioned: 30 June 1999
- Identification: Callsign: NDTE
- Fate: Transferred to Argentia in 1999

Argentina
- Name: Ciudad de Rosario
- Operator: Argentine Navy
- Commissioned: 30 May 2000
- Identification: Callsign: LODK; MMSI number: 701000014
- Status: Active

General characteristics
- Class & type: Red-class buoy tender
- Displacement: 572 long tons (581 t) full load
- Length: 157 ft (47.9 m)
- Beam: 33 ft (10.1 m)
- Draft: 7 ft (2.1 m)
- Installed power: 1,800 hp (1,300 kW)
- Propulsion: 2 × Caterpillar 398A diesel engines
- Speed: 12.5 knots (23.2 km/h; 14.4 mph)
- Range: 2,450 nmi (4,540 km; 2,820 mi) at 10 kn (19 km/h; 12 mph)
- Crew: 32 (4 officers, 28 enlisted)

USCGC Red Wood (WLM-685) is a Red-class coastal buoy tender that was designed, built, owned, and operated by the United States Coast Guard. She was launched in 1964 and homeported at New London, Connecticut for most of her career. In March 1996 she moved to Philadelphia where she replaced the decommissioned USCGC Red Oak. Her primary mission while based in New London was maintaining over 200 aids to navigation from Watch Hill, Rhode Island to Execution Rocks at the west end of Long Island Sound. She also provided fuel and water to several lighthouses including the Falkner Island Lighthouse. Her secondary missions included search and rescue, light icebreaking, law enforcement, and marine environmental protection. Red Wood was initially assigned to the 3rd Coast Guard District, but was later moved to the 1st Coast Guard District when the 3rd was absorbed in a reorganization.

At the end of her Coast Guard career she was transferred to the Argentine Navy, which renamed her ARA Ciudad de Rosario. She remains in active service as part of the Rivers Squadron based near Buenos Aires.

== Acquisition ==
USCGC Hawthorne was built in 1921 for the United States Lighthouse Service. Come the 1960s, she was one of the last United States Coast Guard buoy tenders propelled by a steam engine. Maintaining steam-powered buoy tenders like Hawthorne had become costly and problematic, as spare parts for their engines were no longer available and had to be fabricated. Congress funded Red Wood as a replacement. Hawthorne was the oldest ship in the Coast Guard fleet when she was retired.

== Construction and characteristics ==
Red Wood was built at the Coast Guard Yard in Curtis Bay, Maryland. Her keel was laid down on 1 July 1963. She was launched on 4 April 1964. She was christened by Ruth B. Garmatz, wife of U.S. Representative Edward A. Garmatz. He was chairman of the United States House Committee on Merchant Marine And Fisheries, which had jurisdiction over the Coast Guard budget. He represented the district which included the Coast Guard Yard, so the building of the Red-class cutters was a jobs program for his constituents. Red Wood's initial cost was $2,779,624. She was the first Red-class ship built.

Her hull was built of welded steel plates. The ship was 157 feet (48 m) long overall, with a beam of 33 feet (10 m), and a draft of 7 feet (2.1 m). Her shallow draft and flat bottom was required for her work along the edges of dredged channels, but this hull form made her harder to maneuver and more prone to rolling. Her hull was reinforced for light icebreaking. She displaced 471 tons with a light load, and 572 tons with a full load.

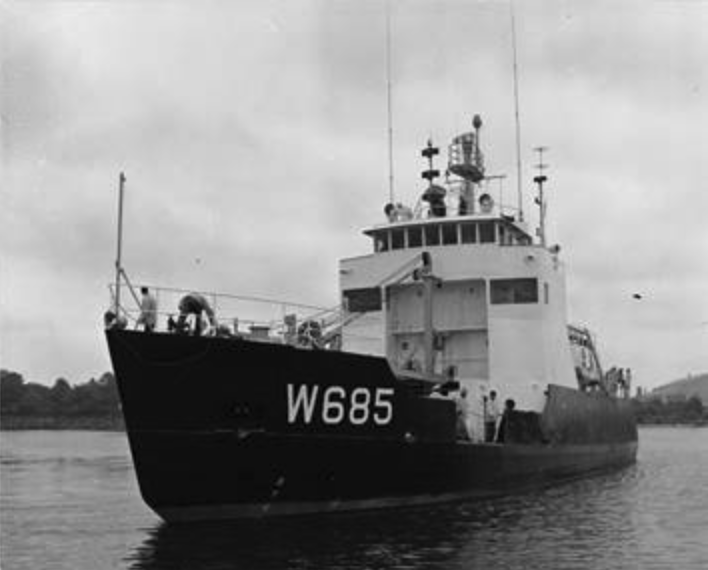
USCGC Red Wood

The ship had two Caterpillar D398A 12-cylinder diesel engines rated at 900 horsepower (670 kW) each. These drove two four-bladed controllable-pitch propellers which were 40 inches (1.0 m) in diameter. Red-class ships had a maximum speed of 12.5 knots (23.2 km/h; 14.4 mph). She had a bow thruster for increased maneuverability. This was driven by a power take-off from the starboard propulsion engine.

Red Wood's tanks held 17,620 U.S. gallons (66,700 L) of diesel fuel. This gave her a range of 2,450 nautical miles (4,540 km; 2,820 mi) at 10 knots (19 km/h; 12 mph), or 2,100 nmi (3,900 km; 2,400 mi) at full speed. There were three engine control stations, two on the bridge wings and one in the pilothouse.

Her buoy deck featured a crane with the ability to lift 10 tons, which could be controlled from two different stations just below the bridge deck. The cranes' hydraulics were driven by a power take-off from the port propulsion engine. Her buoy deck had 1,200 square feet (110 m^{2}) of working space.

The ship had a crew of 4 officers and 28 enlisted sailors. Her commanding officer was a lieutenant, her executive officer was a lieutenant (j.g.), and her 1st lieutenant and engineering officers both held the rank of warrant officer. Crew quarters were air-conditioned, a notable improvement in comfort at the time.

== U.S. Coast Guard service ==
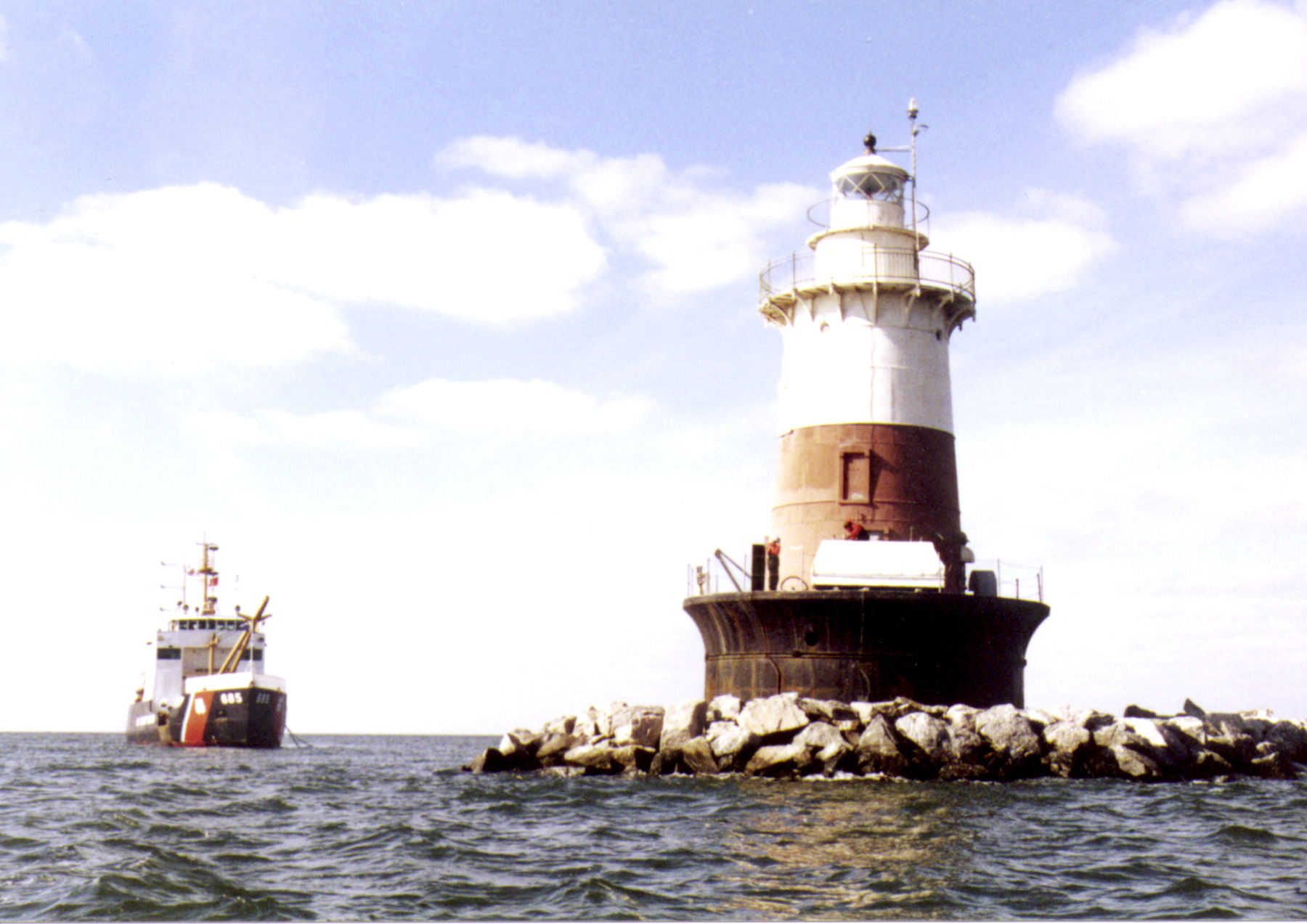
Red Wood refuels generators at Peck Ledge lighthouse by pumping diesel oil ashore from her own tanks

Red Wood was commissioned at a ceremony at the Coast Guard Yard on 4 August 1964. Representative Garmatz spoke at the event. Also attending was Admiral Edwin J. Roland, Commandant of the Coast Guard. Red Wood reached her new homeport of New London on 21 September 1964. She replaced USCGC Hawthorne there, but much of the old ship's crew transferred to Red Wood. She was more than a month behind schedule reaching New London because of mechanical problems, including the failure of her hydraulic system.

The bulk of her time was spent at sea tending her buoy fleet and a number of lighthouses, or moored, maintaining the ship and training the crew. Maintaining her buoys included verifying that they were in their charted positions, replacing lights and batteries, cleaning off marine growth and bird guano, and inspecting and replacing their mooring chains and sinkers.

Red Wood was responsible for the deployment of "Buoy Two Alpha", one of the largest buoys ever used in U.S. waters. It was intended to take the place of the retired Scotland Light Vessel off Sandy Hook, New Jersey on the approach to New York Harbor. The buoy was built by the Electric Boat Division of General Dynamics in Groton, Connecticut and displaced 50 tons, far too large to be carried by any buoy tender. In June 1967, Red Wood towed the buoy from Groton to New York.

On occasion, she was assigned a variety of other missions, as described below.

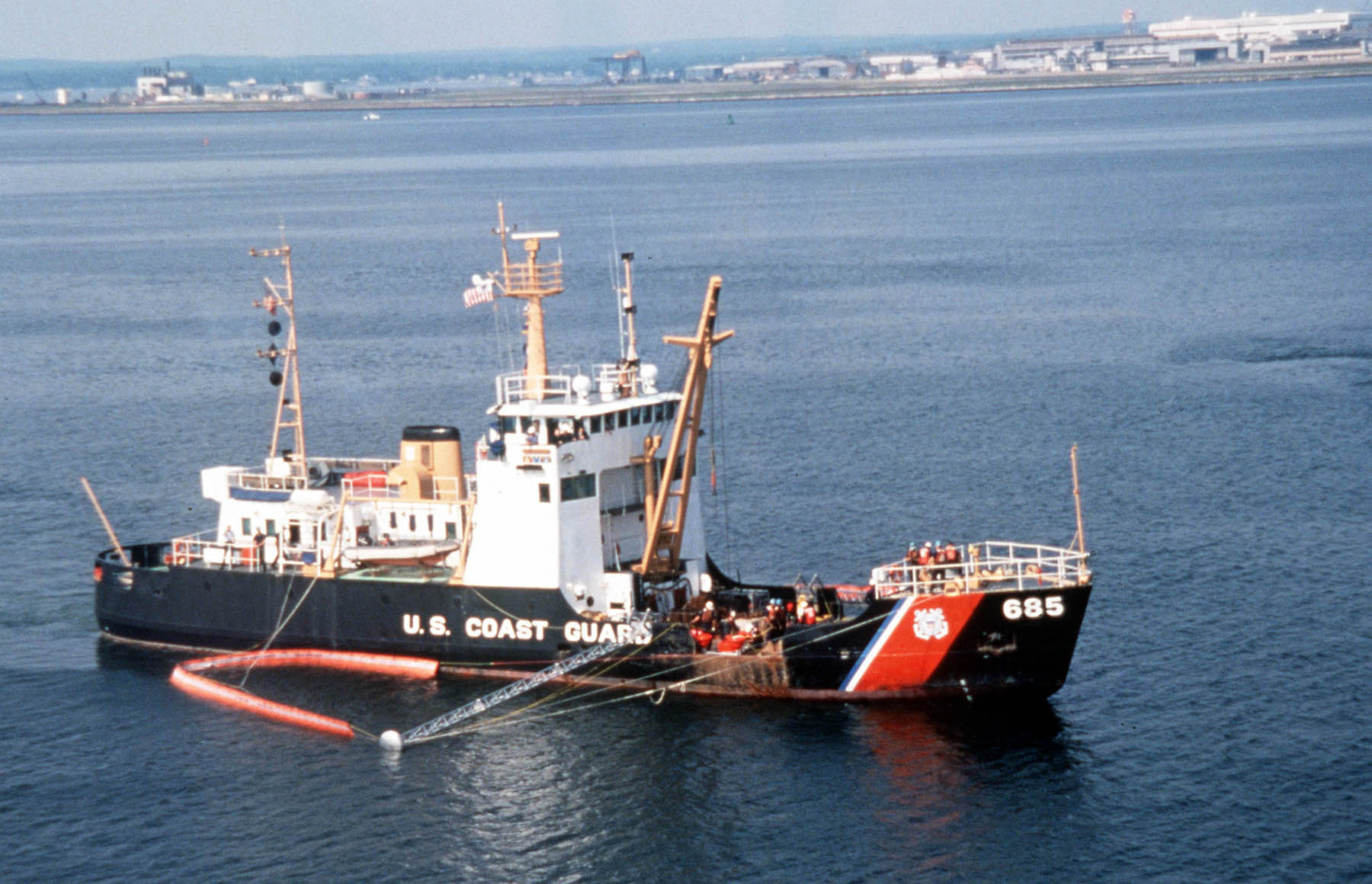
Red Wood skimming a small oil spill in Philadelphia

=== Search and rescue ===
In August 1965, Red Wood stood by to assist USCGC Owasco after she grounded on Little Goshen Reef in Long Island Sound. Owasco was able to pull off the reef under her own power after the tide rose.

In November 1968, Red Wood recovered a body and parts of a Cessna 411 aircraft that crashed in Fisher's Island Sound.

A Bell Jet Ranger helicopter crashed into Long Island Sound off Milford, Connecticut on 1 February 1975. Red Wood was dispatched to the scene and lifted the wreck onto her deck. The pilot was found dead, pinned inside the wreckage.

=== Winter operations ===
Red Wood was used for light icebreaking in the Connecticut, Thames, and Delaware Rivers. This was an important mission in that a number of communities relied on heating oil, gasoline, and fuel oil for power plants delivered by barges on these waterways. Her icebreaking was sometimes used to free ships that had been frozen in.

Large buoys in freshwater rivers where ice conditions are difficult can be damaged, sunk, or dragged off-station by the movement of the ice. In the fall, Red Wood replaced 18 such buoys with smaller seasonal buoys which were less susceptible to ice damage. In the spring, she swapped these out for the larger summer buoys.

=== Public engagement ===
The Coast Guard offered tours of Red Wood on several occasions including:

- Her first day in her new home port of New London in September 1964
- The New York World's Fair in September 1964
- Norwich Rose-Arts Festival in July 1965
- Armed Forces Day celebration in New London in May 1967
- Barnum Festival in Bridgeport in July 1974
- July 4 celebration in New London in 1975
- Shoreline Festival in New London in September 1990
- At Penn's Landing in Philadelphia in July 1998

=== Awards and honors ===
Red Wood earned a Coast Guard Unit Commendation in July 1986 for her participation in the Statue of Liberty centennial celebration. Other awards include two Meritorious Unit Commendations, the Coast Guard Bicentennial Unit Commendation, two National Defense Service Medals, the Humanitarian Service Medal, and two Coast Guard Special Operations ribbons.

On 13 March 1978 fire broke out in Red Wood's engine room. Chief Petty Officer William C. Marshall and Petty Officer 3rd Class James O. Dolloff crawled through intense heat and black smoke to activate the fire pump. With the fire hydrants charged, Red Wood's crew were quickly able to extinguish the fire, which otherwise might have been catastrophic. The two men were awarded the Coast Guard Medal for their heroism.

=== Decommissioning and transfer ===
Red Wood was decommissioned on 30 June 1999. She was replaced in Philadelphia by the Keeper-class cutter USCGC William Tate. Under the Foreign Assistance Act of 1961, surplus military equipment could be transferred to other countries through the Excess Defense Articles program to support U.S. foreign policy objectives. Red Wood was transferred to the Argentine Navy through this program after her decommissioning by the U.S. Coast Guard. This transfer was part of a comprehensive program to improve the Argentine Navy's ability to interdict illicit drugs and their precursor chemicals.

== Argentine Navy service ==
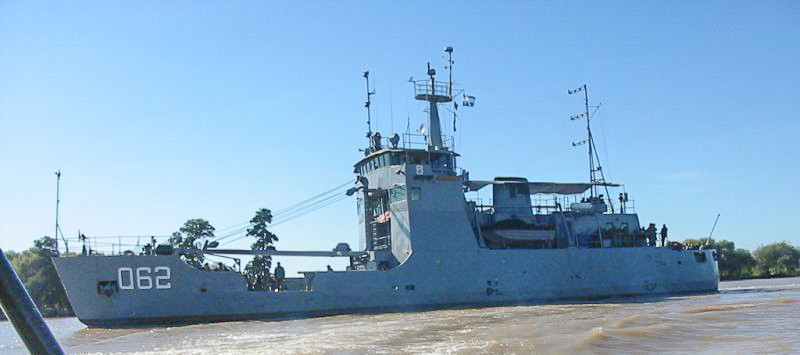
Ciudad de Rosario

On 14 November 1999 the ship was reflagged and became ARA Ciudad de Rosario (Q62). On 30 May 2000 she commenced active duty with the Argentine Navy. Ciudad de Rosario is assigned to the Escuadrilla de Ríos ("Rivers Squadron") based at the Zárate Naval Base near Buenos Aires. Her shallow draft and high maneuverability has helped her succeed in river operations.

Ciudad de Rosario is classed as a "multipurpose ship." She patrols rivers, and is used as a training platform for naval personnel. She has transported medical teams to hard to reach towns along the Paraná and Paraguay Rivers in social health campaigns. She has fought wildfires on islands in the Paraná. The ship transports a Marine Infantry Battalion on the river as needed. Ciudad de Rosario has been opened for public tours from time to time. In 2018 the ship returned to her original use when she tended buoys in the Uruguay River under an agreement with Uruguay.

The ship has conducted medical mission to remote river towns in multiple years, including 2015, 2018, 2019, 2021. Communities which were visited during these health campaigns include Colonia Cano, Puerto Bermejo, Puerto Las Palmas, Yahapé, Ituzaingó, General Lavalle, Isla Cerrtio, Isla Soto, and Isla del Sol. For these mission Ciudad de Rosario was loaded with two "Mobile Health Units". These were 6 metres (20 ft) air-conditioned truck trailers equipped with a dentistry chair, an X-ray machine, refrigeration for vaccine storage, bottled oxygen, and other medical supplies. Medical specialists in pediatrics, cardiology, ophthalmology, urology, gynecology, and obstetrics accompanied the ship.

During the COVID-19 pandemic Ciudad de Rosario carried vaccines, food, clothing, and other supplies to remote riverside communities.

The ship underwent a major overhaul at the Tandanor shipyard in 2022.

Ciudad de Rosario was dispatched in 2014 and again in 2023 to collect hydrographic data for the "Canal Magdalena", a new route from the Atlantic to Buenos Aires through the River Plate estuary.
