= Keeper-class cutter =

U.S. Coast Guard buoy tender class

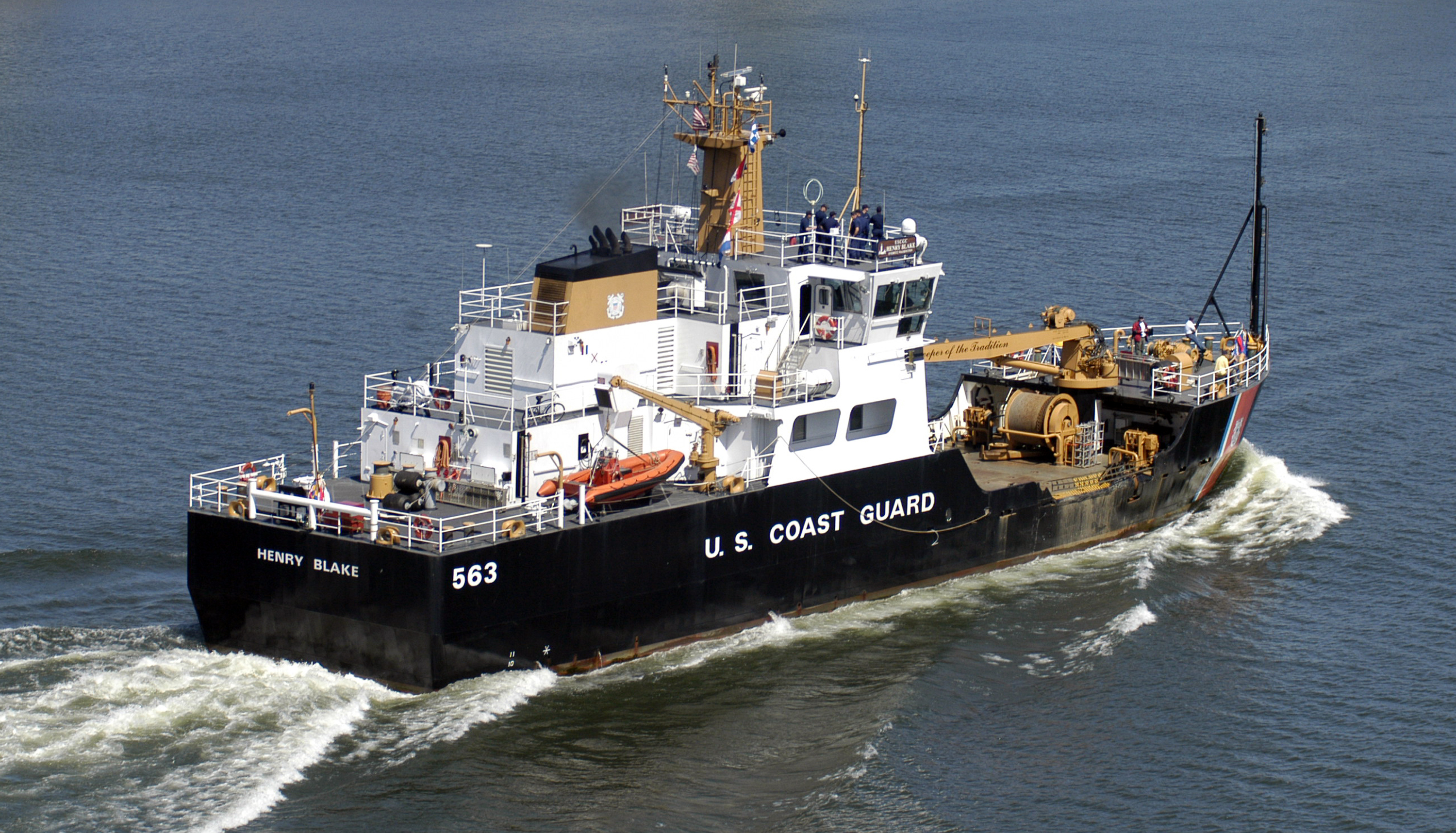
- USCGC Henry Blake, the 13th Keeper-class ship launched

Class overview
- Name: Keeper class
- Builders: Marinette Marine Corporation
- Operators: United States Coast Guard
- Preceded by: White class; Red class
- Built: 1995–1999
- Completed: 14

General characteristics
- Type: Coastal buoy tender
- Displacement: 850 long tons (864 t) full load
- Length: 175 ft (53 m)
- Beam: 36 ft (11 m)
- Draft: 8 ft (2.4 m)
- Installed power: 2,000 hp (1,500 kW) sustained
- Propulsion: 2 × Caterpillar 3508 DITA diesel engines; bow thruster, 500 hp (373 kW)
- Speed: 12 knots (22 km/h; 14 mph)
- Range: 2,000 nmi (3,700 km; 2,300 mi) at 10 knots (19 km/h; 12 mph)

The Keeper class of coastal buoy tenders consists of fourteen ships built for and operated by the United States Coast Guard. The ships were launched between 1995 and 1999 and all remain in active service. Their primary mission is to maintain thousands of aids to navigation, both buoys and land-based. Their secondary missions include marine environmental protection, search and rescue, law enforcement, and light ice-breaking.

The Keeper-class ships play a specific role in the Coast Guard's buoy tender fleet. They are primarily deployed to coastal areas such as New York Harbor, Chesapeake Bay, and Puget Sound, while the seagoing tenders of the Juniper class handle more off-shore areas, and inland tenders are assigned to the nation's large river systems.

== Origins and procurement ==
In 1991, the average age of the twelve Coast Guard coastal buoy tenders approached 40 years, and the oldest was 52 years old. Maintenance costs on these vessels were growing quickly, and reliability was decreasing. One White-class ship underwent emergency dry-docking to replace hull plates that had nearly rusted through. The obsolescence of the coastal buoy tender fleet came as no surprise, since some had been built during World War II, but it took several years for the Coast Guard, its parent agency at the time, the Department of Transportation, Congress, and private shipyards to deliver a solution.

The coastal buoy tender replacement project originated in the Operations Directorate of Coast Guard Headquarters. The sponsor requirements documents generated there formed the basis for the work done by the Acquisitions Directorate. At this point, existing Federal Government regulations, notably Office of Management and Budget Circular A-109 dealing with major systems acquisition, specified much of the contracting process.

The project was reviewed by the Transportation Systems Acquisition and Review Council and approved on 25 March 1992. Congress enacted $23 million for the first stage of acquisition in the FY 1993 budget. On 1 July 1992 a request for proposals was issued to the shipbuilding industry. On 12 March 1993 the technical and cost evaluations of the proposals were completed. On 17 May 1993 final contract negotiations were completed. On 1 June 1993 the Commandant of the Coast Guard issued a document titled "WLM(R) Circular of Requirements", specifying major aspects of the ships' design. On 22 June 1993, a contract was awarded to Marinette Marine Corporation to build the ships. Aspects of the acquisition process were criticized by the General Accounting Office.

The contract was a firm order for detailed design and the production of the lead vessel in the class, USCGC Ida Lewis, at a fixed cost of $22 million plus various performance incentives, with options for thirteen more ships, spare parts, and training. If all options in the contract were exercised by the Coast Guard, the total value of the deal was $291 million. The Coast Guard exercised options for three additional ships on 7 February 1996, six more ships in February 1997, and the final four in September 1997.

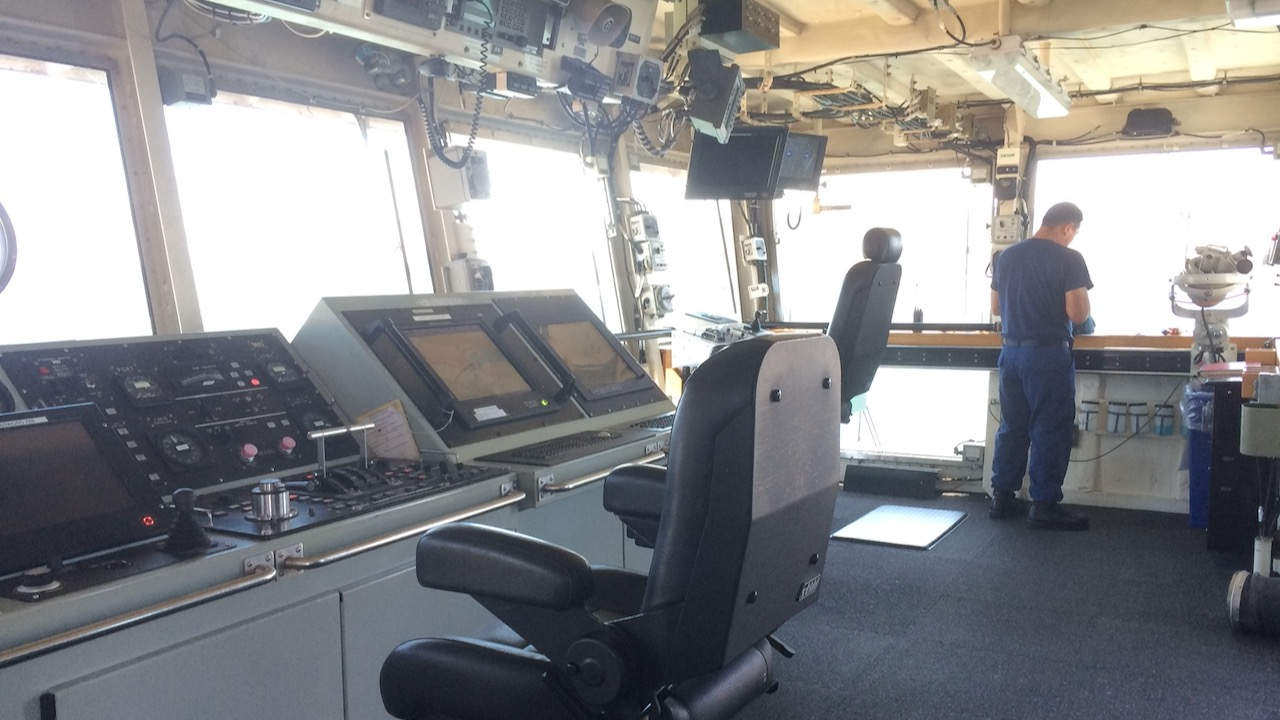
The bridge aboard a Keeper-class ship

At the time of the contract award, the Coast Guard announced its intentions to replace the eleven White-class and Red-class cutters still in service with the fourteen keeper-class ships. This saved maintenance expenses on the aging ships, and also significantly reduced personnel requirements through the introduction of advanced technology. While the Keeper class launched with a crew of 18, the Red and White-class buoy tenders they replaced had crews of 32 and 24, respectively.

As the Coast Guard planned to replace its coastal buoy tender fleet, it also needed to replace its seagoing buoy tenders. This fleet also consisted of World War II ships that had served beyond their original design life. Thus, the history of the Keeper class is entwined with the seagoing Juniper class in a number of ways. Since the Coast Guard was replacing almost all of its saltwater buoy tender fleet, it considered the mix between seagoing and coastal tenders. This resulted in a buoy tender fleet with more of the smaller, cheaper Keeper-class ships, and fewer of the more expensive seagoing ships. Since both classes were designed in the same time period, they adopted similar technical solutions, such as Z-drive propulsion. All ships of both classes were built by Marinette Marine, and the construction overlapped. The Coast Guard placed a 60-person Project Resident Office on site at Marinette's shipyard to monitor and facilitate these two concurrent construction programs.

== Construction and characteristics ==
All fourteen ships of the Keeper class were built at Marinette Marine's shipyard in Marinette, Wisconsin. Their hulls were built of welded steel plates. The ships are 175 feet (53 m) long, with a beam of 36 feet (11 m), and a full-load draft of 8 feet (2.4 m). They displace 850 long tons fully loaded. Their gross tonnage is 904, and their net tonnage is 271. The top of the mast is 58.75 feet (17.91 m) above the waterline.

Rather than building the ships from the keel up as a single unit, Marinette Marine used a modular fabrication approach. Eight large modules, or "hull blocks" were built separately and then welded together.

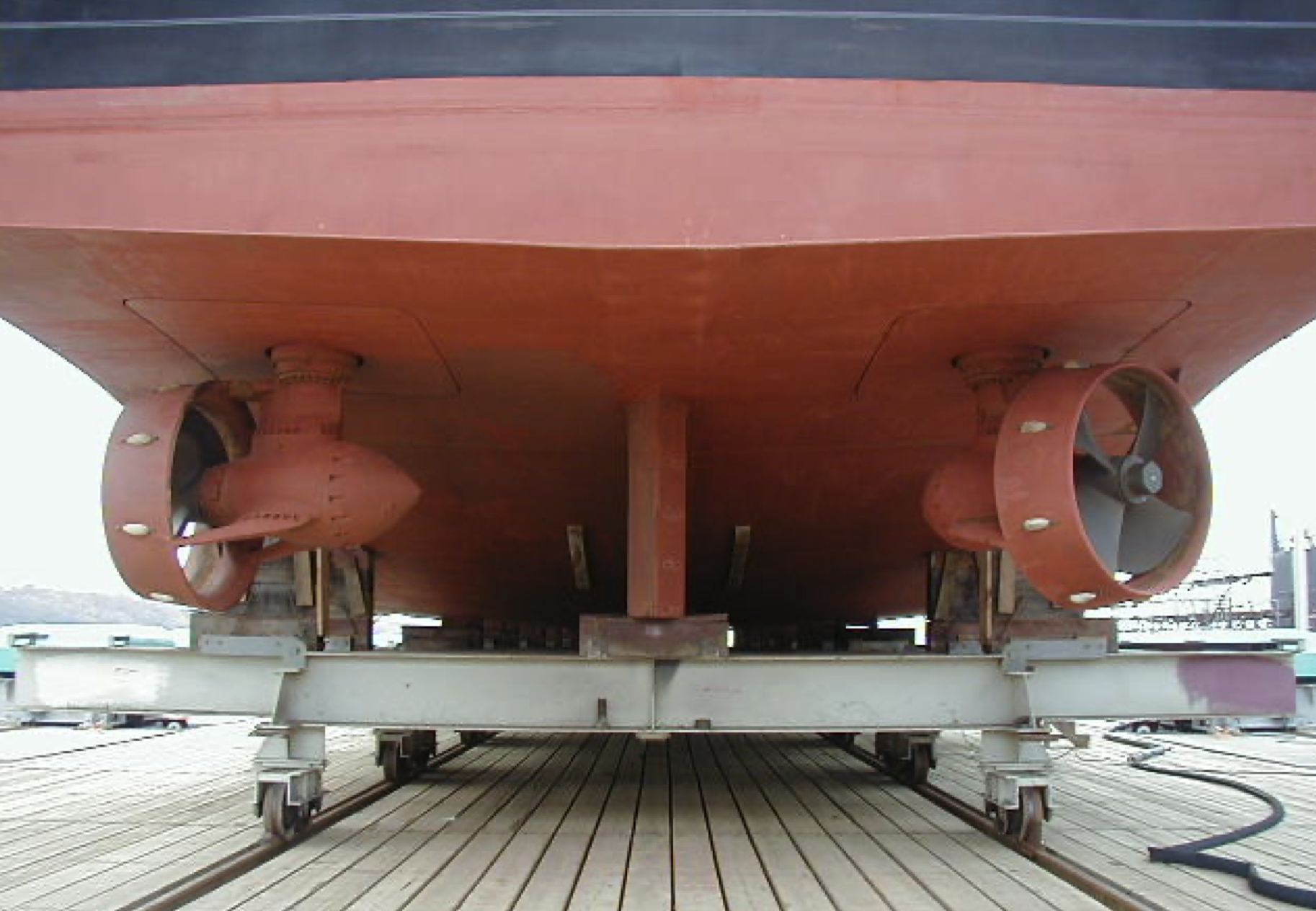
Z-drives on a Keeper-class ship

The ships have two Caterpillar 3508 DITA (direct-injection, turbocharged, aftercooled) 8-cylinder diesel engines which produce 1,000 horsepower (750 kW) each. These drive two Ulstein Z-drives. Keeper-class ships were the first Coast Guard cutters equipped with Z-drives, which markedly improved their maneuverability. The Z-drives have four-bladed propellers which are 57.1 inches (145 cm) in diameter and are equipped with Kort nozzles. They can be operated in "tiller mode" where the Z-drives turn in the same direction to steer the ship, or in "Z-conn mode" where the two Z-drives can turn in different directions to achieve specific maneuvering objectives. An implication of the Z-drives is that there is no reverse gear or rudder aboard Keeper-class ships. In order to back a ship, the Z-drives are turned 180 degrees which drives a ship stern-first even though the propellers are spinning in the same direction as they do when the ship is moving forward. Their maximum speed is 12 knots (22 km/h; 14 mph). Their tanks can hold 16,385 US gallons (62,020 L; 13,643 imp gal) of diesel fuel which gives them an unrefueled range of 2,000 nautical miles (3,700 km; 2,300 mi) at 10 knots (19 km/h; 12 mph).

The ships have a 500-horsepower (370 kW) bow thruster. The Z-drives and bow thruster can be linked in a Dynamic Positioning System. This gives Keeper-class vessels the ability to hold position in the water even in heavy currents, winds, and swells. This advanced capability is useful in bringing buoys aboard that can weigh more than 16,000 pounds (7,300 kg).

Electrical power aboard is provided by three Caterpillar 3406 DITA generators which produce 285 kW each. Each ship also has a 210 kW emergency generator, which is a Caterpillar 3406 DIT.

The buoy deck has 1,335 square feet (124.0 m^{2}) of working area. A crane with a boom 42 feet (13 m) long lifts buoys and their mooring anchors onto the deck. The crane can lift up to 20,000 pounds (9,100 kg).

The ships' fresh water tanks can hold 7,339 US gallons (27,780 L; 6,111 imp gal). They also have three ballast tanks that can be filled to maintain their trim, and tanks for oily waste water, sewage, gray water, new lubrication oil, and waste oil.

Accommodations were designed for mixed gender crews from the start. Crew size and composition has varied over the years. When Ida Lewis, the lead ship of the class was commissioned in 1997, she had a crew of 18, commanded by a Chief Warrant Officer. By 2000 the crew had been increased to 20 personnel. Currently, the crew is 2 officers and 22 enlisted personnel.

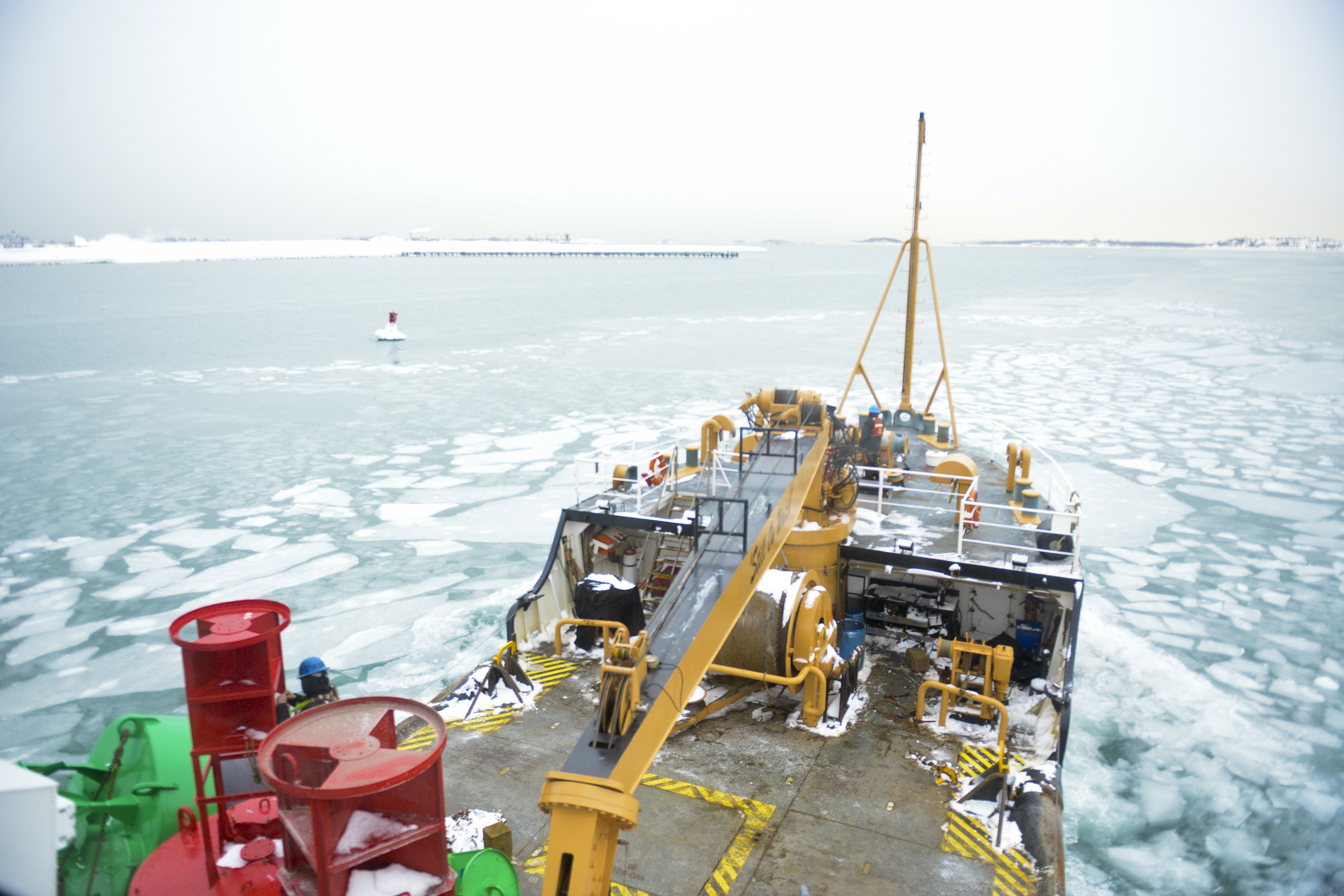
USCGC Marcus Hanna breaking ice near Boston

Keeper-class hulls have a strengthened "ice belt" along the waterline so that they can work on aids to navigation in ice-infested waters. Not only is the hull plating in the ice belt thicker than the rest of the hull, but framing members are closer together in areas that experience greater loads when working in ice. Higher grades of steel were used for hull plating in the ice belt to prevent cracking in cold temperatures. Keeper-class bows are sloped so that rather than smashing into ice, they ride up over it and break it with the weight of the ship. The ships are capable of breaking flat, 9-inch (230 mm) thick ice at 3 knots (5.6 km/h; 3.5 mph).

Each ship carries a cutter boat on davits. They were originally equipped with CB-M boats which were replaced in the mid-2010s with CB-ATON-M boats. These were built by Metal Shark Aluminum Boats and were estimated to cost $210,000 each. The boats are 18 feet (5.5 m) long and are equipped with a Mercury Marine inboard/outboard diesel engine.

All 14 Keeper-class cutters are named after distinguished American lighthouse keepers.

== In-service vessel sustainment ==
Keeper-class ships were designed to serve for thirty years. In order to reach that goal, the Coast Guard has awarded class-wide contracts for a number of major maintenance items:

- In 2023, Adrick Marine Group won a $5 million contract to upgrade HVAC systems
- In 2023, Exail won a $2.2 million contract to replace the gyrocompass on each ship
- In 2022, Appleton Marine won an $18.8 million contract to service the main crane and hydraulic systems

== Ships in the Keeper class ==
All of the ships were launched into the Menominee River in Marinette, Wisconsin. There they were completed and underwent builder's trials. When the Coast Guard accepted the ships, and ownership passed from Marinette Marine, they were placed "in commission, special" status. The crews were trained by Marinette personnel in Lake Michigan. They then sailed through the Great Lakes and out into the Atlantic to reach their new home ports. They made frequent stops. For example, Henry Blake, which had one of the longer trips from Marinette, made port calls in four countries and eleven states. When the ships reached their new homes, a public commissioning ceremony was held, and the ships were placed "in commission, full" status.

Name	Penant Number	Launched	In Commission, Full	Home port	Replaced	Photo
Ida Lewis	WLM-551	14 October 1995	11 April 1997	Newport, Rhode Island	USCGC White Sage	
Katherine Walker	WLM-552	14 September 1996	1 November 1997	Bayonne, New Jersey	USCGC Red Beech	
Abbie Burgess	WLM-553	5 April 1997	31 July 1998	Rockland, Maine	USCGC White Lupine	
Marcus Hanna	WLM-554	23 August 1997	9 May 1998	South Portland, Maine	USCGC Spar	
James Rankin	WLM-555	25 April 1998	1 May 1999	Baltimore, Maryland	USCGC Red Birch	
Joshua Appleby	WLM-556	8 August 1998	7 May 1999	St. Petersburg, Florida	USCGC White Sumac	
Frank Drew	WLM-557	5 December 1998	5 April 2000	Portsmouth, Virginia	USCGC Red Cedar	
Anthony Petit	WLM-558	30 January 1999		Ketchikan, Alaska	USCGC Planetree	
Barbara Mabrity	WLM-559	27 March 1999	20 November 1999	Mobile, Alabama	USCGC White Pine	
William Tate	WLM-560	8 May 1999	3 June 2000	Philadelphia, Pennsylvania	USCGC Red Wood	
Harry Claiborne	WLM-561	12 June 1999	31 March 2000	Galveston, Texas	USCGC Papaw	
Maria Bray	WLM-562	18 September 1999	26 July 2000	Jacksonville, Florida	USCGC Laurel	
Henry Blake	WLM-563	20 November 1999	27 October 2000	Everett, Washington	USCGC Mariposa	
George Cobb	WLM-564	18 December 1999	27 October 2000	San Pedro, California	USCGC Conifer	
