= USCGC Joshua Appleby =

Watercraft launched in 1998

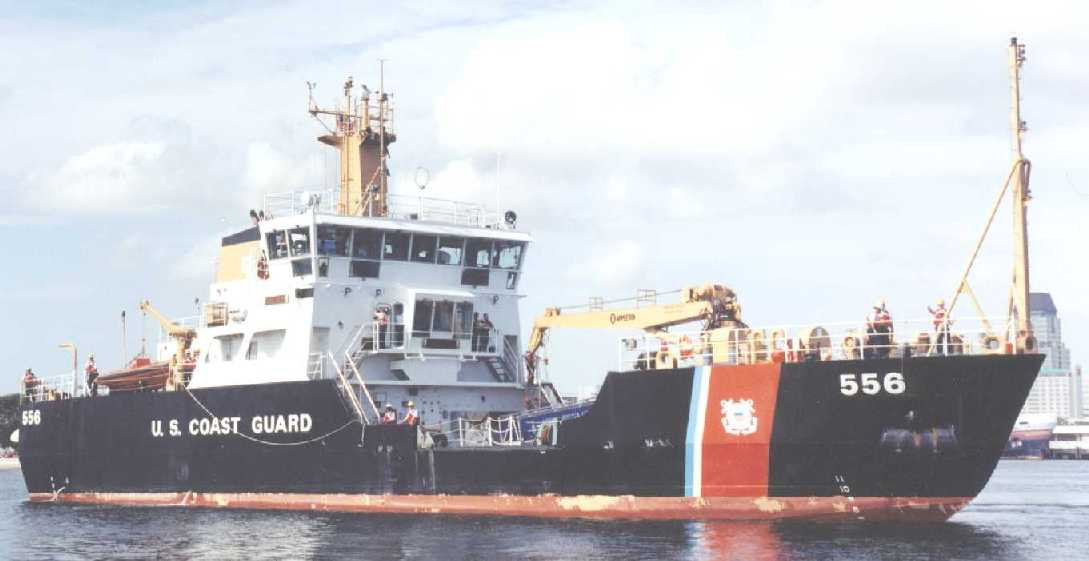
- USCGC Joshua Appleby (WLM-556)

History

United States
- Name: USCGC Joshua Appleby (WLM-563)
- Namesake: Captain Joshua Appleby, Keeper of the Sand Key Lighthouse 1837-1846
- Commissioned: 8 August 1998
- Home port: St. Petersburg, Florida
- Identification: IMO number: 9177246; MMSI number: 368732000
- Motto: "The Wrecking Keeper"
- Status: In service
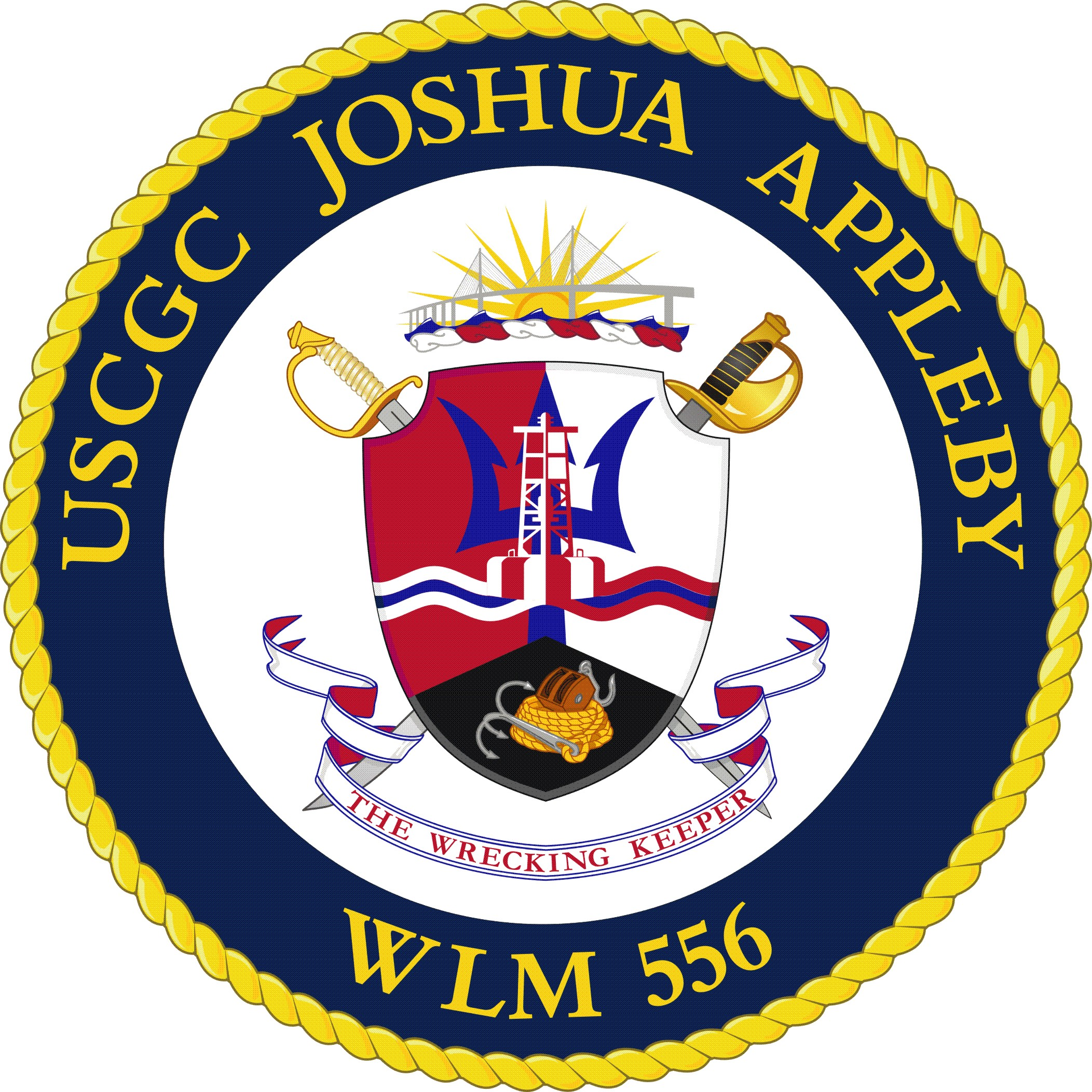
- Badge

General characteristics
- Class & type: Keeper-class cutter
- Tonnage: 904 GT ITC
- Displacement: 840 long tons (850 t)
- Length: 175 ft (53 m)
- Beam: 36 ft (11 m)
- Draft: 8 ft (2.4 m)
- Propulsion: Two diesel engines powering two Z-drive housings
- Speed: 10 knots (19 km/h; 12 mph)
- Range: 2,000 nautical miles (3,700 km; 2,300 mi)
- Crew: 18 enlisted, 1 officer

USCGC Joshua Appleby (WLM-556) is a United States Coast Guard Keeper-class cutter based out of St. Petersburg, Florida.

== History ==
The Joshua Appleby was commissioned on August 8, 1998. The 6th of 14 Keeper-class cutters, the Joshua Appleby is one of the most advanced cutters currently in the United States Coast Guard's fleet. The Joshua Appleby is named in honor of Captain Joshua Appleby, Keeper of the Sand Key Lighthouse 1837–1846. All 14 Keeper-class cutters are named after lighthouse keepers. The Joshua Appleby' takes for its motto, "The Wrecking Keeper" after Joshua Appleby's very colorful history of shipwreck salvaging.

== Mission ==
The Joshua Appleby's primary mission is the maintenance of over 400 aids to navigation in the Tampa Bay and along the west coast of Florida, including the Florida Keys. Secondary missions include Alien Migration Intercept Operation (AMIO), search and rescue (SAR), and pollution response.

== Design ==
The Keeper-class cutters are the first US Coast Guard cutters equipped with Z-drive propulsion units instead of the standard propeller and rudder configuration. They are designed to independently rotate 360 degrees. Combined with a thruster in the bow, they give the Keeper-class cutters unmatched maneuverability. With state-of-the-art electronics and navigation systems including Dynamic Positioning System (DPS) which uses a Differential Global Positioning System, and electronic chart displays, these buoy tenders maneuver and position aids more accurately and efficiently with fewer crew. The advancement in technology has allowed the crew size to be cut from 24-34 members to 18 members.

== Namesake ==
The ship is named after an American lighthouse keeper Joshua Appleby. Appleby is remembered for having lost his life in the Great Havana Hurricane of 1846. A native of Rhode Island, Joshua Appleby served as keeper of the Sand Key Light in the Florida Keys. Hurricanes in 1841 and 1842 caused considerable damage to the key, destroying Appleby's house and undermining the foundation of the light. The government repaired the damage and built a seawall, in hopes of adding further protection. A hurricane in 1844 swept away half of the key, part of the sea wall, and again destroyed Appleby's house. Seemingly unfazed by the dangers of his station, Appleby rebuilt and remained as keeper of the light. On 11 October 1846, Appleby, his 51-year-old daughter Eliza, and his 11-year-old grandson Thomas were swept away to become additional victims of the hurricane which was calculated to have caused the deaths of at least 255 people.
