= U.S. Coast Guard environmental protection =

Marine environmental protection is one of the eleven missions of the United States Coast Guard (USCG).

Protecting the delicate ecosystem of oceans is a vital Coast Guard mission. The Coast Guard works with a variety of groups and organizations to ensure the livelihood of endangered marine species.

Through the Marine Environmental Protection program (MEP), the Coast Guard develops and enforces regulations to avert the introduction of invasive species into the maritime environment, stop unauthorized ocean dumping, and prevent oil and chemical spills.

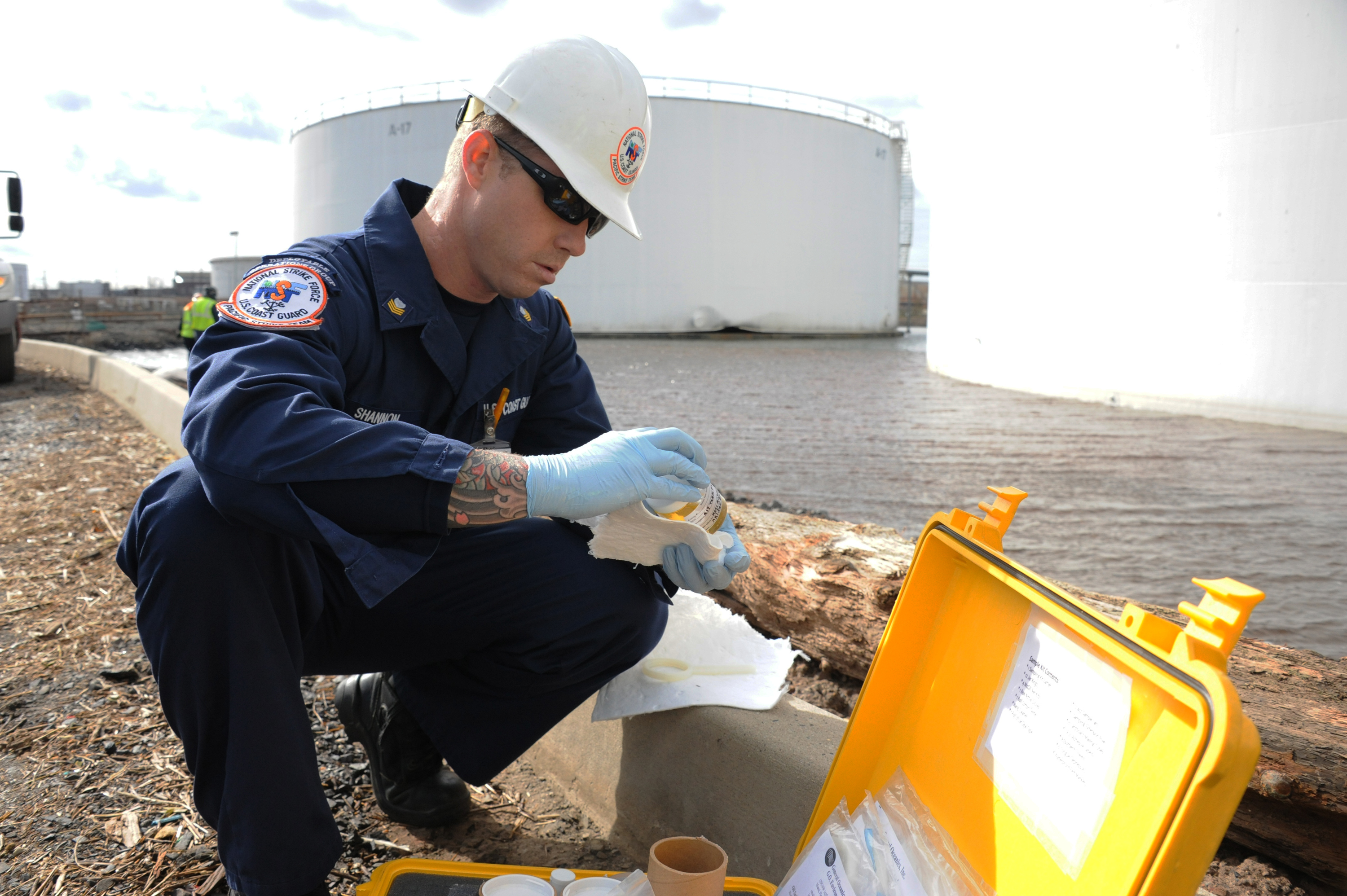
A Coast Guard Marine Science Technician takes a water sample near a damaged tank at an oil refinery.

There are five areas of emphasis for MEPs mission. These areas cover virtually every aspect of oil and chemical response, and provide the goals and objectives for Coast Guard initiatives.

The five areas are:

- Prevention
  - To stop pollution before it occurs, with:
    - Training
    - Equipment
    - Procedures
- Enforcement
  - To provide civil and criminal penalties for illegal acts
- Surveillance
  - To protect the marine environment by conducting:
    - Pollution overflights
    - Vessel boardings
    - Harbor patrols
    - Transfer monitoring
    - Facility inspections
- Response
  - Cleanup and impact limitation of an oil or chemical discharge
- In-house abatement
  - Ensure that Coast Guard vessels and facilities comply with federal pollution laws and regulations
