= Nanarup, Western Australia =

Locality in the City of Albany, Western Australia

Nanarup
- other
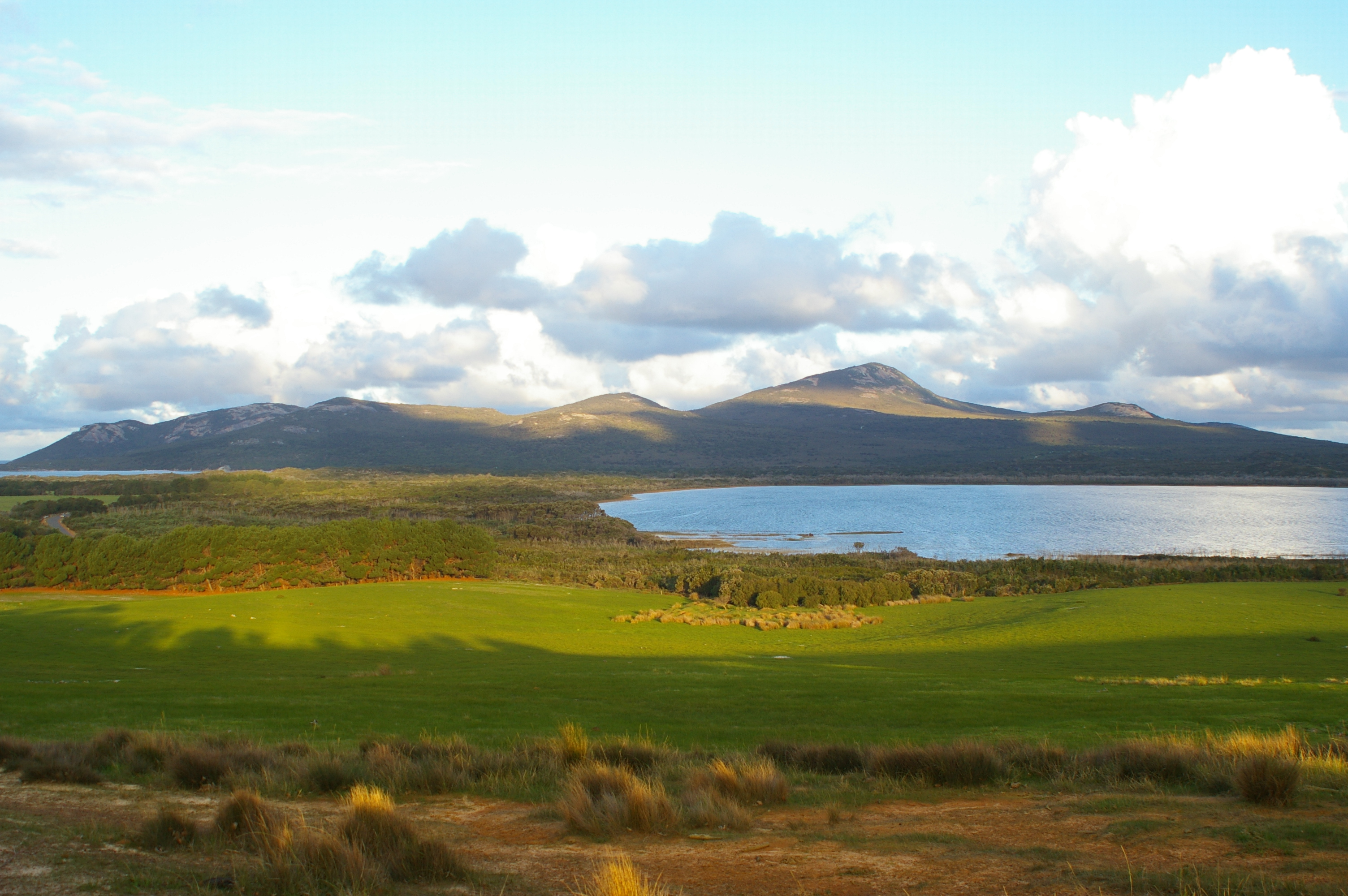
- View of the southern part of the nature reserve from Two Peoples Bay

- Coordinates: 34.97080°S 118.11596°E
- Country: Australia
- State: Western Australia
- LGA(s): City of Albany
- Location: 395 km (245 mi) SE of Perth; 16 km (9.9 mi) E of Albany

Government
  - State electorate(s): Albany
  - Federal division(s): O'Connor

Area
  - Total: 71.9 km^{2} (27.8 sq mi)

Population
  - Total(s): 38 (SAL 2021)
- Postcode: 6330
Localities around Nanarup
Kalgan	Kalgan	Manypeaks
Kalgan	Nanarup	Southern Ocean
	Southern Ocean

Nanarup is a rural locality of the City of Albany in the Great Southern region of Western Australia, located along the Southern Ocean. The far west of the locality is taken up by parts of Gull Rock National Park while the eastern half of Nanarup is taken up by the Two Peoples Bay Nature Reserve. In between the two lies Taylor Inlet and Nanarup Beach.

Nanarup is on the traditional land of the Minang people of the Noongar nation.

The heritage listed Springmount homestead and the Fisherman's Shack, both located in Nanarup.

Springmount was built for Henry and Alice Leishman, the latter being the sister of Australian artist Rupert Bunny. The Leishmans moved to Albany in 1892 and subsequently settled in Nanarup. By the turn of the century, Springmount became one of the most notable farms in the area. The farm was left to their son Hugh, one of their three children, after the First World War, but Hugh died after an accident in 1925. With their daughter Lillian having died from pneumonia in 1924 and their other daughter, Grace, having married in 1910, Springmount became a guesthouse in the 1930s. Henry Leishman died in 1935 and the property was being leased out, becoming a popular holiday destination. The property was subsequently renamed Lake View Guesthouse, because of the views of Taylor Inlet. It has since been sold a number of times.

The Fisherman's Shack is the only surviving example of the shacks built in the area after the Second World War, the others having been removed when the area became the Two Peoples Bay Nature Reserve in 1966. It was subsequently used by park staff and scientific visitors.
