= Gull Rock (disambiguation) =

Gull Rock is a rock formation in California.

Gull Rock may also refer to:

- Gull Rock, an islet in Michigan off Manitou Island (Lake Superior), United States
- Gull Rock, a community in the Township of Muskoka Lakes in Ontario, Canada
- Gull Rock, Madison, a rock formation off Madison, Connecticut, United States
- Gull Rock Light Station, a lighthouse in Michigan, United States
- Gull Rock National Park, a national park in Western Australia, Australia
- Gull Rocks Light, a former lighthouse in Rhode Island, United States
- Gull Rock, Minnesota, a rock formation in Lake of the Woods, United States.
