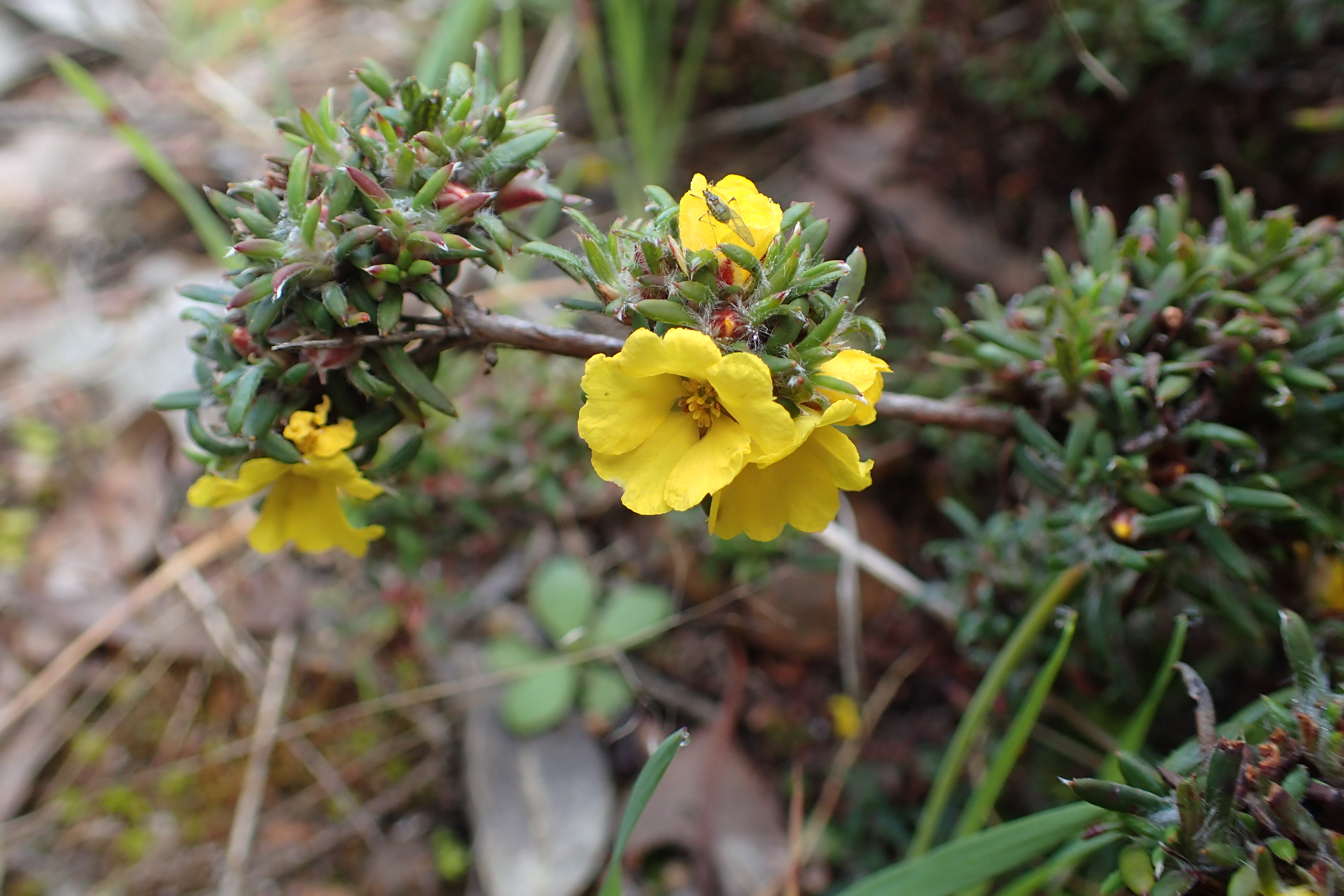

Scientific classification
- Kingdom: Plantae
- Clade: Tracheophytes
- Clade: Angiosperms
- Clade: Eudicots
- Order: Dilleniales
- Family: Dilleniaceae
- Genus: Hibbertia
- Species: H. depressa

Binomial name
- Hibbertia depressa Steud.

Synonyms
- Candollea fasciculata R.Br. ex DC.; Candollea kochioides Turcz.

= Hibbertia depressa =

Species of flowering plant

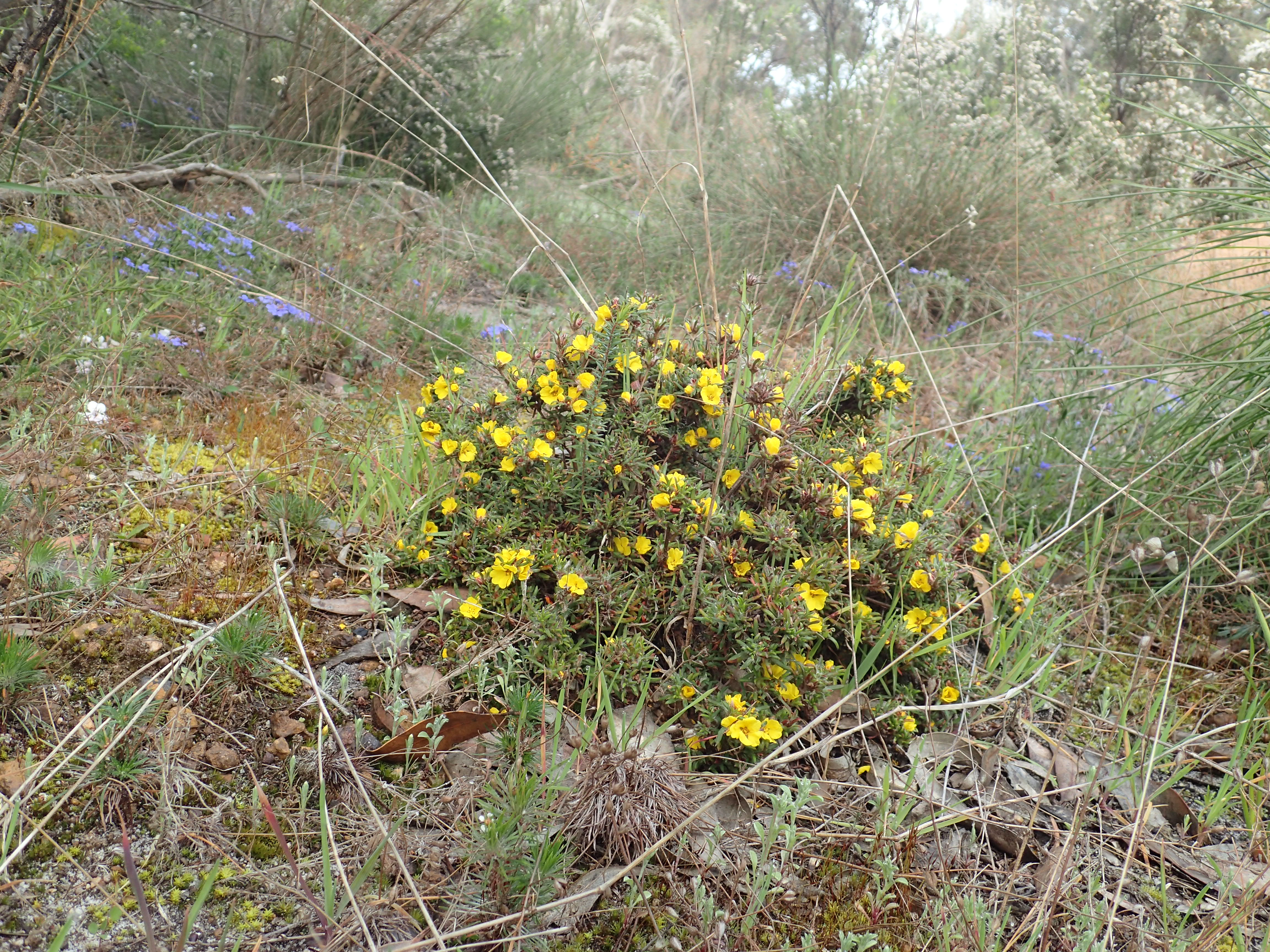
Habit near Mount Barker

Hibbertia depressa is a species of flowering plant in the family Dilleniaceae and is endemic to the far south-west of Western Australia. It is a prostrate or sprawling shrub with spreading, usually densely clustered, linear leaves and yellow flowers arranged singly or clustered among the leaves.

== Description ==
Hibbertia depressa is a prostrate or sprawling shrub that typically grows to a height of up to 30 cm (12 in) with hairy young branches. The leaves are clustered near the ends of branches, linear, mostly 5–25 mm (0.20–0.98 in) long and 1–3 mm (0.039–0.118 in) wide and more or less sessile. The flowers are arranged singly or clustered among the clustered leaves and are 8–11 mm (0.31–0.43 in) in diameter. There are up to three brown, egg-shaped bracts 1.5–3 mm (0.059–0.118 in) long. The five sepals are joined at the base, the sepal lobes elliptic to egg-shaped, the outer sepal lobes 1.5–2.5 mm (0.059–0.098 in) wide and the inner lobes 2–3 mm (0.079–0.118 in) wide. The five petals are yellow, egg-shaped with the narrower end towards the base, 3.5–6 mm (0.14–0.24 in) long and there are fifteen stamens in five groups of three arranged around the five glabrous carpels each with a single ovule. Flowering has been recorded from September to February.

== Taxonomy ==
Hibbertia depressa was first formally described by the botanist Ernst Gottlieb von Steudel in 1845 in Johann Georg Christian Lehmann's Plantae Preissianae. The specific epithet (depressa) means "pressed down", referring to the low habit of the plant.

== Distribution and habitat ==
This hibbertia commonly grows in jarrah woodland, sometimes in coastal shrubland and is found between the Kent River, Nanarup and Mount Barker in the Avon Wheatbelt, Jarrah Forest and Warren biogeographic regions in the far south-west of Western Australia.

== Conservation status ==
Hibbertia depressa is classified as "not threatened" by the Government of Western Australia Department of Parks and Wildlife.

== See also ==
- List of Hibbertia species
