= Ida Lewis =

American lighthouse keeper (1842–1911)

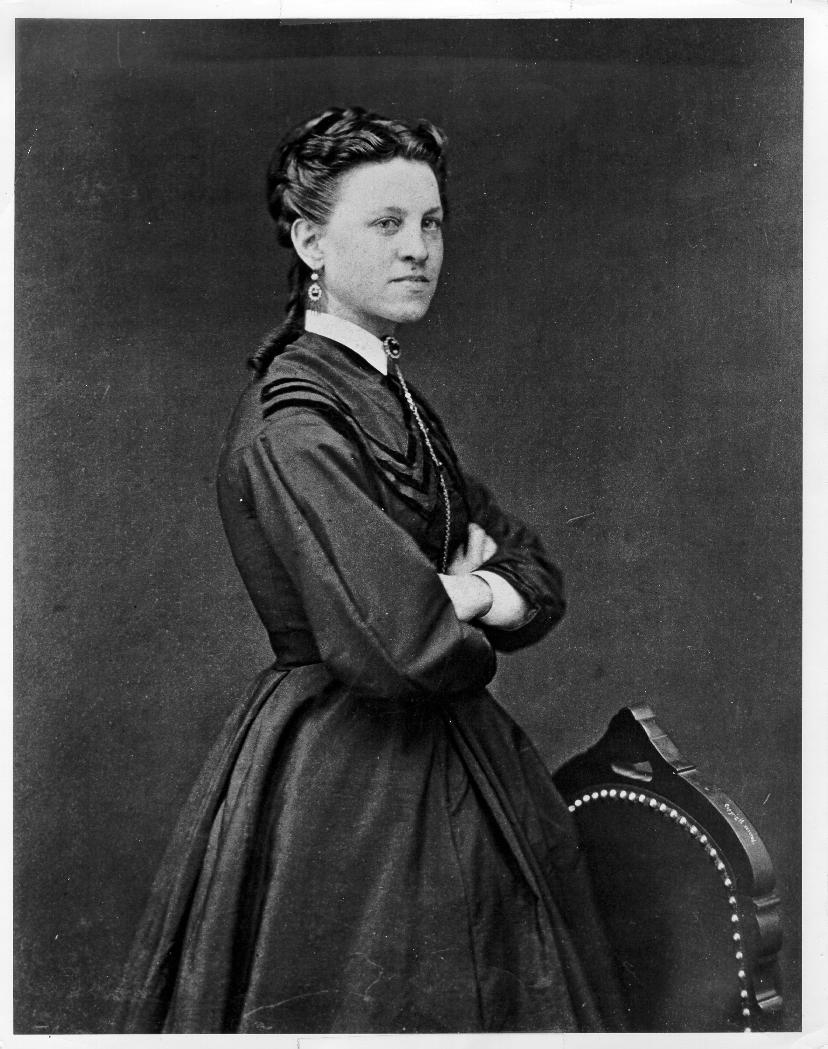
- Born: Idawalley Zorada Lewis; February 25, 1842; Newport, Rhode Island, US
- Died: October 24, 1911 (aged 69); Lime Rock Island, Rhode Island, US
- Burial place: Common Burying Ground, Rhode Island
- Spouse: William Wilson (m. 1870; sep. 1872)

Idawalley Zoradia Lewis (Note: First names sometimes misspelled as Idawalley Zorada. For sometime after her marriage, Ida used Lewis-Wilson as her last name, but eventually reverted to her maiden name.) (February 25, 1842 – October 24, 1911) was an American lighthouse keeper noted for her heroism in rescuing people from the seas.

== Biography ==
=== Early years ===
Ida Lewis was born in Newport, Rhode Island, the second oldest of four children of Captain Hosea Lewis of the Revenue-Marine. Her father was transferred to the Lighthouse Service and appointed keeper of Lime Rock Light on the small near-island Lime Rock in Newport in 1854, taking his family to live on the rock in 1857. After the family had been at Lime Rock for less than four months, he suffered a stroke and became disabled. Ida Lewis expanded her domestic duties to include caring for him and a seriously ill sister and also, with her mother's assistance, tending the light: filling the lamp with oil at sundown and again at midnight, trimming the wick, polishing carbon off the reflectors, and extinguishing the light at dawn.

Since Lime Rock was almost completely surrounded by water, the only way to reach the mainland was by boat. By age 15, Lewis had become known as the best swimmer in Newport. She rowed her younger siblings to school every weekday and fetched supplies from town as they were needed. She became very skillful at handling her heavy rowboat. Responding to criticism that it was un-ladylike for women to row boats, Lewis said that "None – but a donkey, would consider it 'un-feminine', to save lives."

Lewis and her mother tended the Lime Rock Light for her father from 1857 until 1873 when he died. Her mother was then appointed keeper, although Ida continued to do the keeper's work. By 1877 her mother's health was failing, leaving Ida with increased housekeeping and care-giving responsibilities. Her mother eventually died of cancer in 1878. Ida finally received the official appointment as keeper in 1879, largely through the efforts of an admirer, General Ambrose Everett Burnside, a Civil War hero who became a Rhode Island governor and United States senator. With a salary of $750 per year, Lewis was for a time the highest-paid lighthouse keeper in the nation. The extra pay was given "in consideration of the remarkable services of Mrs. Wilson in the saving of lives".

=== Accomplishments ===
Lewis made her first rescue in 1854, coming to the assistance of four men whose boat had capsized. She was 12 years old.

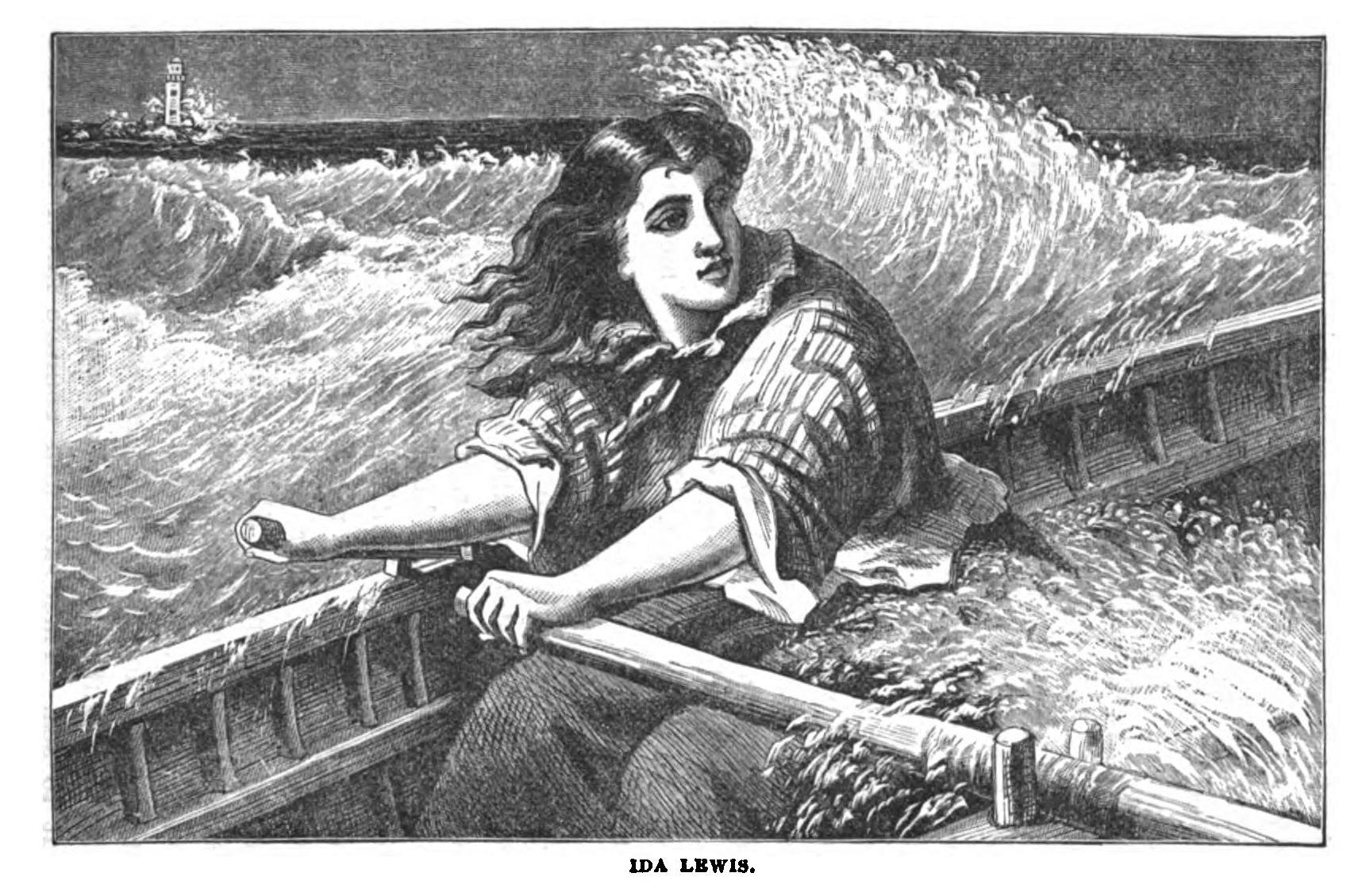
Illustration of Ida Lewis rowing from book by Phebe Ann Hanaford, copied from earlier print of Grace Darling

Her most famous rescue occurred on March 29, 1869. Two soldiers, Sgt. James Adams and Pvt. John McLaughlin, were passing through Newport Harbor toward Fort Adams in a small boat, guided by a 14-year-old boy who claimed to know his way through the harbor. A snowstorm was churning the harbor's waters, and the boat overturned. The two soldiers clung to it while the boy was lost, dying in the icy water. Lewis's mother saw the two in the water and called to Ida, who was suffering from a cold. Ida ran to her boat without taking the time to put on a coat or shoes. With the help of her younger brother, she was able to haul the two men into her boat and bring them to the lighthouse. One of them later gave a gold watch to Lewis. The soldiers at Fort Adams showed their appreciation by collecting $218 for her. On July 16, 1881, she was awarded the rare Gold Lifesaving Medal from the United States government – the first woman to receive it – for her rescue on February 4, 1881, of two soldiers from Fort Adams who had fallen through the ice while attempting to return to the fort on foot.

Gold Lifesaving Medal Citation
"Rescuing from drowning at various times at least thirteen persons, and particularly for the rescue of two soldiers who had broken through the ice near Lime Rock on the afternoon of February 4, 1881".

Because of her many rescues, Lewis became the best-known lighthouse keeper of her day. During her 54 years on Lime Rock she is credited with saving 18 lives, although unofficial reports suggest the number may have been as high as 25. She kept no records of her lifesaving exploits. Lewis's fame spread quickly following the 1869 rescue, as a reporter was sent from the New-York Tribune to record her deeds. Articles also appeared in Harper's Weekly and Leslie's magazine, among others. The Life Saving Benevolent Association of New York sent her a silver medal. A parade was held in her honor in Newport on Independence Day, followed by the presentation of a sleek, mahogany rowboat with red velvet cushions, gold braid around the gunwales, and gold-plated oar-locks. When she was 64, Lewis became a life beneficiary of the Carnegie Hero Fund, receiving a monthly pension of $30.

During her lifetime, Lewis was called "the Bravest Woman in America" and her exploits were detailed in the national press. She met President Ulysses S. Grant, Vice-President Schuyler Colfax, General William Tecumseh Sherman, and Admiral George Dewey, in addition to many of the wealthy and prominent people who summered in Newport. Members of the Women's suffrage movement – including Elizabeth Cady Stanton – came to visit her and used her as an example of the inherent strength of women. At least two pieces of music were named for her: the Ida Lewis Waltz, and the Rescue Polka Mazurka. Ida Lewis hats and scarves were sold.

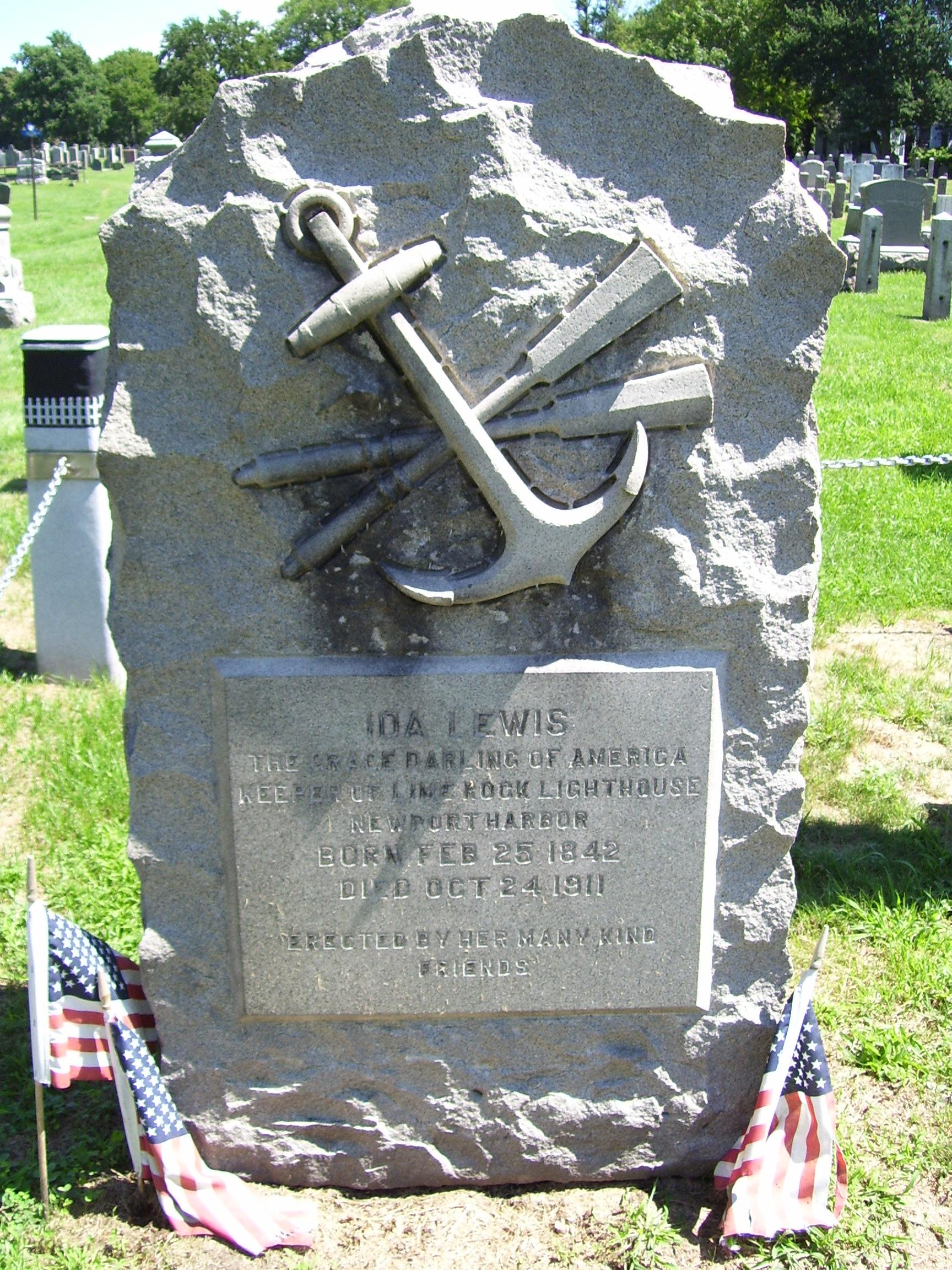
Ida Lewis' grave at the Common Burying Ground

=== Later years ===
Her father amused himself by counting the people who came to the island to see Ida: there were often a hundred a day, and in one summer, there were 9,000. She also received numerous gifts, letters, and even marriage proposals. In 1870, she married Captain William Wilson of Black Rock, Connecticut, but they separated after two years, and she returned to Lime Rock. She spent most of her career alone there.

Lewis made her last recorded rescue when she was 63. A friend was rowing out to the lighthouse, stood up in her boat, lost her balance, and fell into the water. Lewis rowed out to her and hauled her aboard.

Lewis died of a stroke on October 24, 1911, at the age of 69. The bells of all the vessels in Newport Harbor tolled for her that night, and flags were at half-staff throughout Newport. More than 1,400 people viewed her body at the Thames Street Methodist Church. Among the crowd that gathered to pay its respects were several keepers: Charles Schoeneman, of the Newport Harbor Light; Charles Curtis of the Rose Island Light, O. F. Kirby of Gull Rocks Light; and Edward Fogerty of the Brenton Reef Lightship. The captain and crew of a local life-saving station in Newport were also present. Ida Lewis was buried in the Common Burying Ground, in a prominent location, so her grave can be seen by passersby.

== Legacy ==
In 1924 the Rhode Island legislature officially changed the name of Lime Rock to Ida Lewis Rock. The lighthouse service changed the name of the Lime Rock Lighthouse to the Ida Lewis Rock Lighthouse – the only such honor ever paid to a keeper in the United States. It is now the clubhouse of the Ida Lewis Yacht Club. The burgee of the Ida Lewis Yacht Club features a lighthouse with 18 stars, representing the 18 people rescued by Ida Lewis.

In 1995, the United States Coast Guard named the first of a new class of buoy tenders for Ida Lewis. The USCGC Ida Lewis (WLM-551), the lead ship of the 175' Keeper class, is stationed at Middletown, Rhode Island.

The folk song "Lighthouse Keeper" by Neptune's Car was inspired by the experiences of women lighthouse tenders including Lewis, Katherine Walker, and Abbie Burgess.

Ida Lewis' Gold Lifesaving Medal, along with two other medals awarded to her and other artifacts, are in the collections of the Newport Historical Society.

In 2017, a Google Doodle commemorated her 175th birthday. The same day, the United States Coast Guard Northeast division posted a tweet honoring her birthday; it was later re-tweeted by the US Coast Guard main handle.

In 2018, Ida Lewis became the first woman to have a road named after her at Arlington National Cemetery; the road is called Lewis Drive.

English folk singer Reg Meuross's 2019 album RAW includes a song called "The Eyes of Ida Lewis". The song tells the story of Ida Lewis in the voice of an imagined suitor whose life she had saved.

== See also ==
- Grace Darling
- Katherine Walker
