= Lime Rock =

Lime Rock may refer to:

United States

- Lime Rock (Salisbury), a neighborhood in the village of Lakeville, Connecticut
- Lime Rock Park, a race track in Lime Rock, Connecticut
- Lime Rock, Rhode Island, a village in Lincoln, Rhode Island
- Lime Rock (island), an island in Narragansett Bay in the state of Rhode Island
- Lime Rock, Wisconsin, a ghost town
