= Limerock =

Lime Rock may refer to a place in the United States:

- Lime Rock (Salisbury, Connecticut), a neighborhood in the village of Lakeville, Connecticut
  - Lime Rock Park, an auto racetrack
- Lime Rock, Rhode Island, a village
- Lime Rock Light, a lighthouse in Newport, Rhode Island now known as the Ida Lewis Rock Light
