= USCGC Ida Lewis =

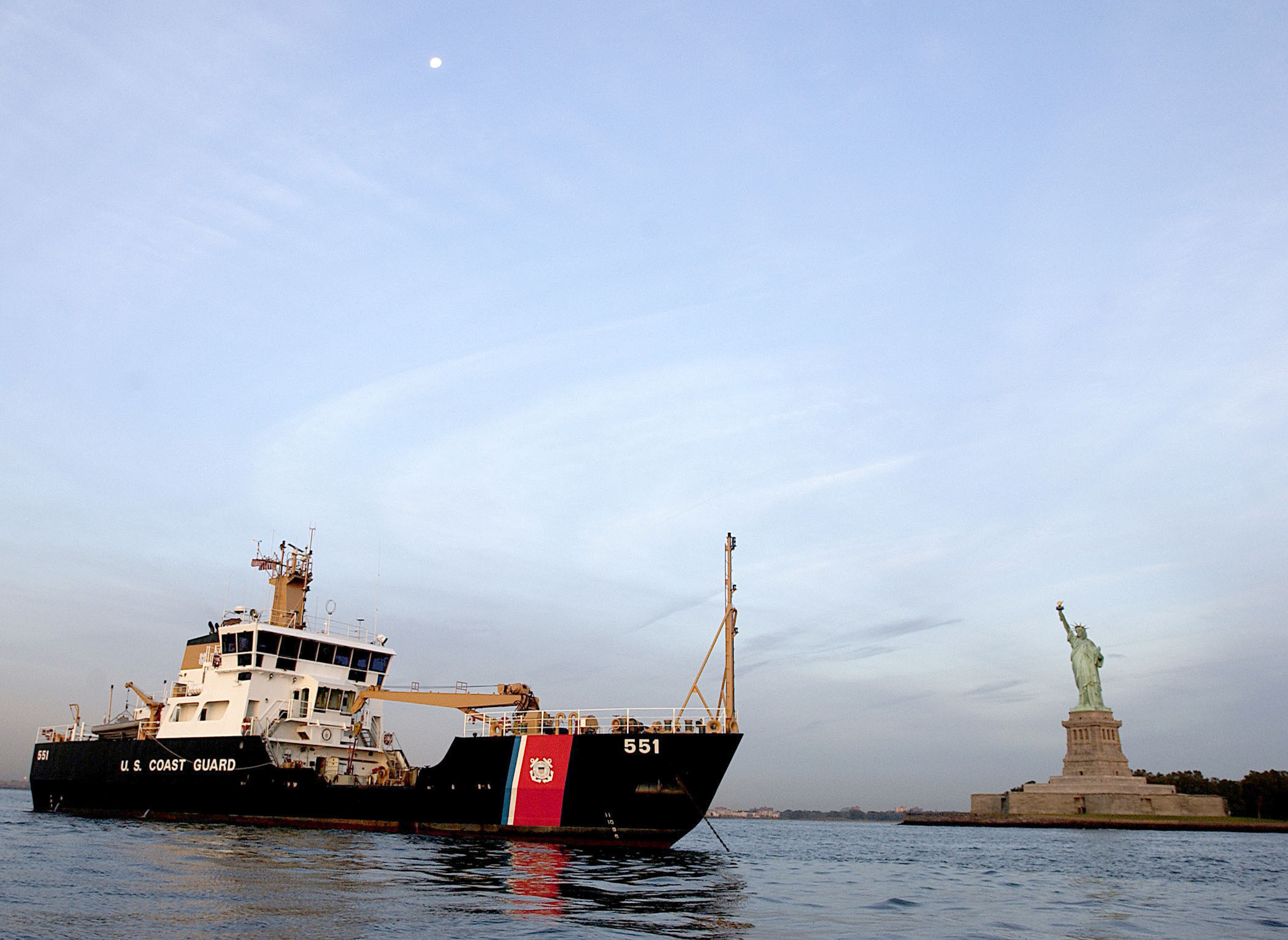
- USCGC Ida Lewis in New York Harbor

History

United States
- Name: Ida Lewis
- Namesake: Ida Lewis, keeper of the Lime Rock Light
- Operator: US Coast Guard
- Builder: Marinette Marine Corporation
- Laid down: August, 1994
- Launched: October 14, 1995
- Commissioned: April 12, 1997
- Home port: Newport, Rhode Island
- Identification: IMO 9155585; MMSI 367807000; Call Sign NISS
- Status: Active
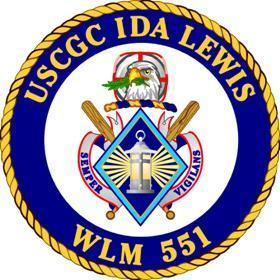
- Badge

General characteristics
- Type: Keeper-class coastal buoy-tender
- Displacement: 850 long tons (864 t) full load
- Length: 175 ft (53.3 m)
- Beam: 36 ft (11.0 m)
- Draft: 8 ft (2.4 m)
- Installed power: 2,000 hp (1,500 kW) sustained
- Propulsion: 2 × Caterpillar 3508 DITA Diesel engines; bow thruster, 500 hp (373 kW)
- Speed: 12 knots (22 km/h; 14 mph)
- Range: 2000 nautical miles at 10 kn
- Crew: 24 (2 Officers, 22 Enlisted)

USCGC Ida Lewis (WLM-551) is the lead ship of the United States Coast Guard Keeper-class of Coastal Buoy Tenders, named for Ida Lewis, keeper of the Lime Rock Light. Launched in 1995, she has spent her entire career maintaining navigational aids near her homeport of Newport, Rhode Island. Ida Lewis is assigned to the First Coast Guard District.

== Construction ==
Ida Lewis was built by Marinette Marine Corporation in Marinette, Wisconsin. The contract for the detailed design and construction of the ship was awarded on 22 June 1993, and the keel was laid in August 1994. The contract price was $22 million. The ship was launched on October 14, 1995 into the Menominee River. She was the first of the fourteen Keeper-class vessels completed. The featured speaker at the christening ceremony was Coast Guard Commandant Admiral Robert E. Kramek. His wife, Patricia, christened the ship.

Her hull was built of welded steel plates. She is 175 feet (53 m) long, with a beam of 36 feet (11 m), and a full-load draft of 8 feet (2.4 m). Ida Lewis displaces 850 long tons fully loaded. Her gross register tonnage is 903, and her net register tonnage is 270. The top of the mast is 58.75 feet (17.91 m) above the waterline.

Rather than building the ship from the keel up as a single unit, Marinette Marine used a modular fabrication approach. Eight large modules, or "hull blocks" were built separately and then welded together.

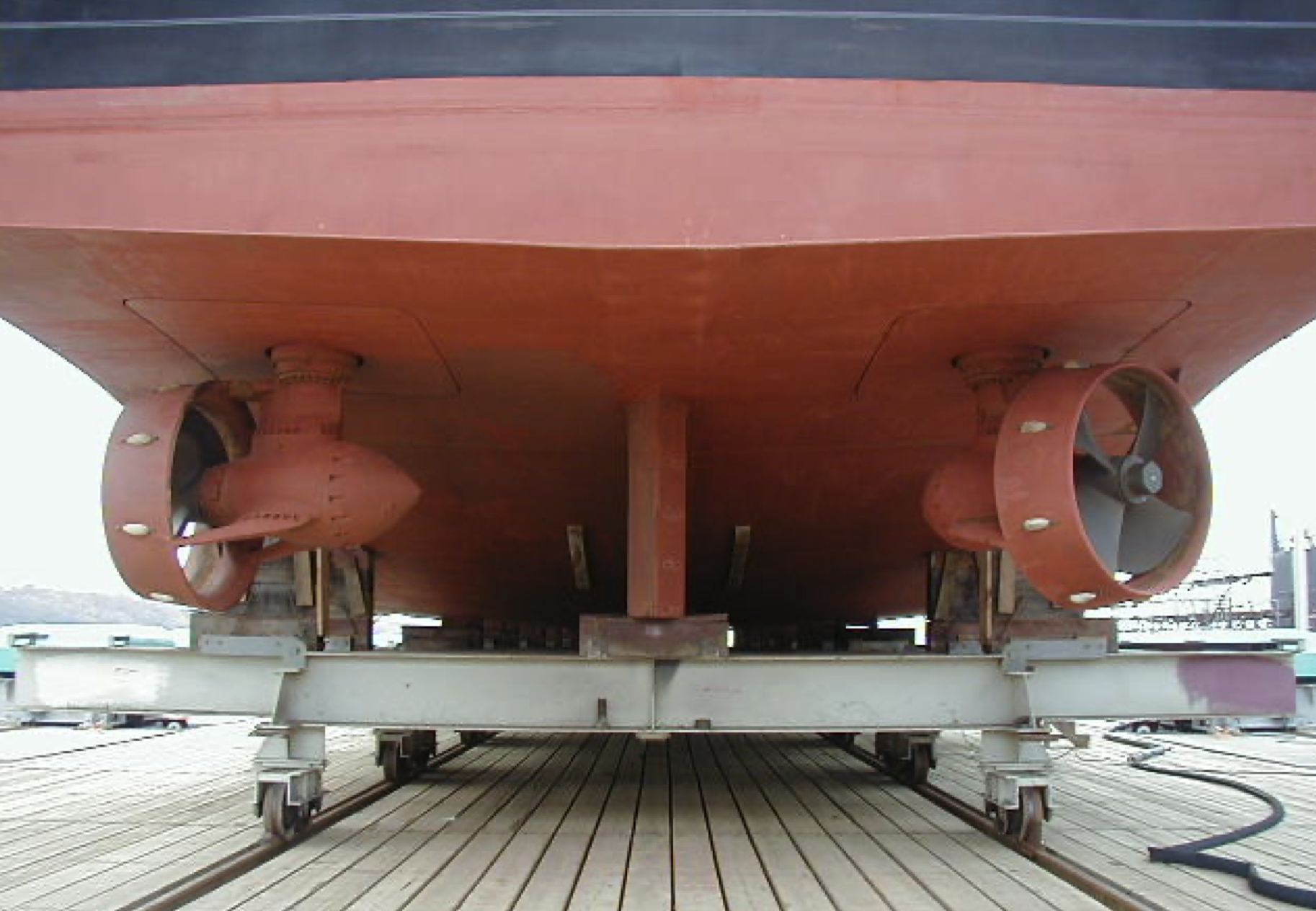
Z-drives on a Keeper-class ship

The ship has two Caterpillar 3508 DITA (direct-injection, turbocharged, aftercooled) 8-cylinder Diesel engines which produce 1000 horsepower each. These drive two Ulstein Z-drives. Keeper-class ships were the first Coast Guard cutters equipped with Z-drives, which markedly improved their maneuverability. The Z-drives have four-bladed propellers which are 57.1 inches (145 cm) in diameter and are equipped with Kort nozzles. They can be operated in "tiller mode" where the Z-drives turn in the same direction to steer the ship, or in "Z-conn mode" where the two Z-drives can turn in different directions to achieve specific maneuvering objectives. An implication of the Z-drives is that there is no reverse gear or rudder aboard Ida Lewis. In order to back a ship, the Z-drives are turned 180 degrees which drives the ship stern-first even though the propellers are spinning in the same direction as they do when the ship is moving forward. Her maximum speed is 12 knots. Her tanks can hold 16,385 gallons of diesel fuel which gives her an unrefueled range of 2,000 nautical miles at 10 knots.

She has a 500 horsepower bow thruster. The Z-drives and bow thruster can be linked in a Dynamic Positioning System. This gives Ida Lewis the ability to hold position in the water even in heavy currents, winds, and swells. This advanced capability is useful in bringing buoys aboard that can weigh more than 16,000 lbs.

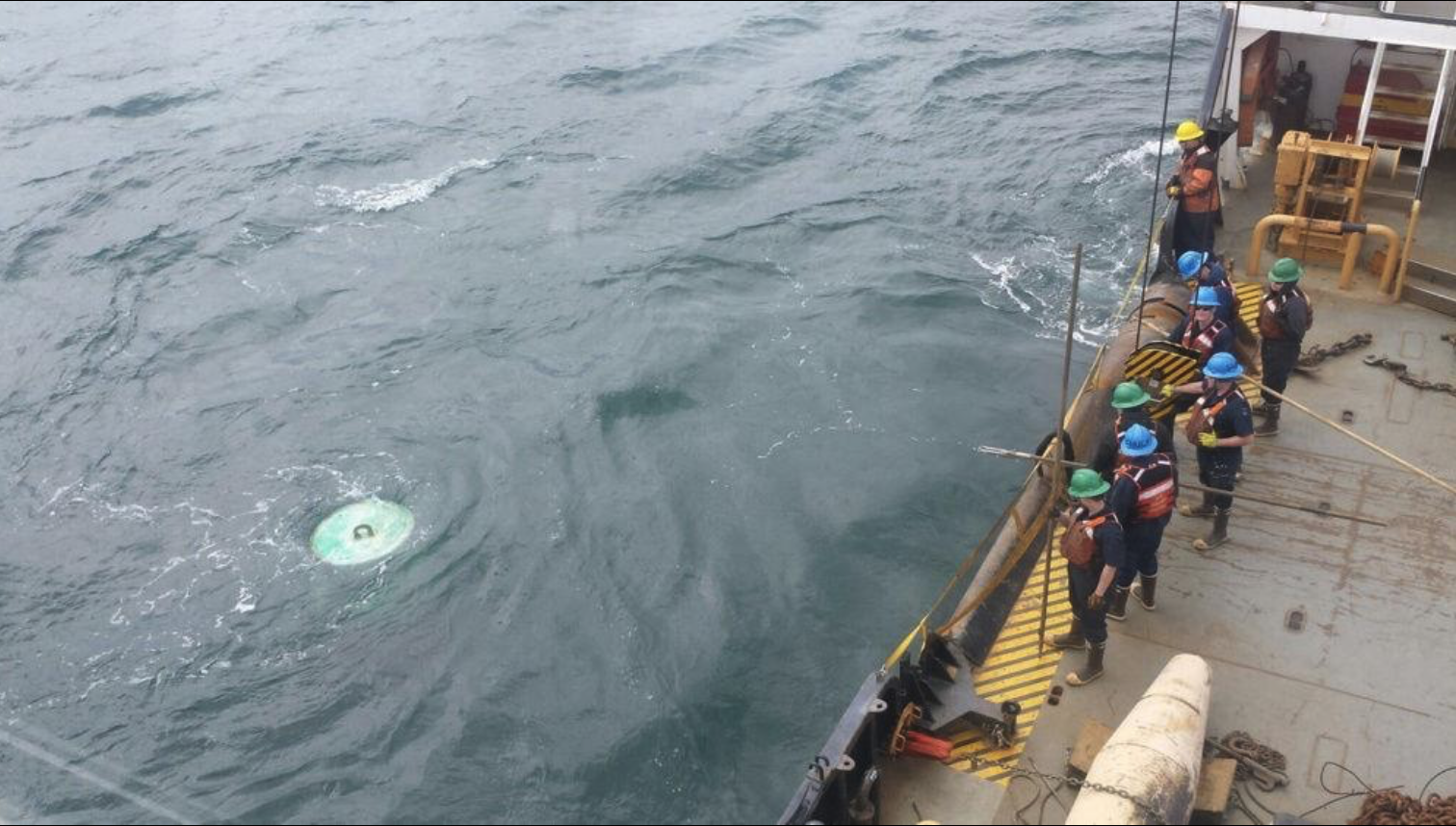
Ida Lewis retrieving a sunken buoy in 2017

Electrical power aboard is provided by three Caterpillar 3406 DITA generators which produce 285 Kw each. She also has a 210 Kw emergency generator, which is a Caterpillar 3406 DIT.

The buoy deck has 1,335 square feet (124.0 m^{2}) of working area. A crane with a boom 42 feet (13 m) long lifts buoys and their mooring anchors onto the deck. The crane can lift up to 20,000 pounds (9,100 kg).

The ships' fresh water tanks can hold 7,339 gallons. They also have three ballast tanks that can be filled to maintain their trim, and tanks for oily waste water, sewage, gray water, new lubrication oil, and waste oil.

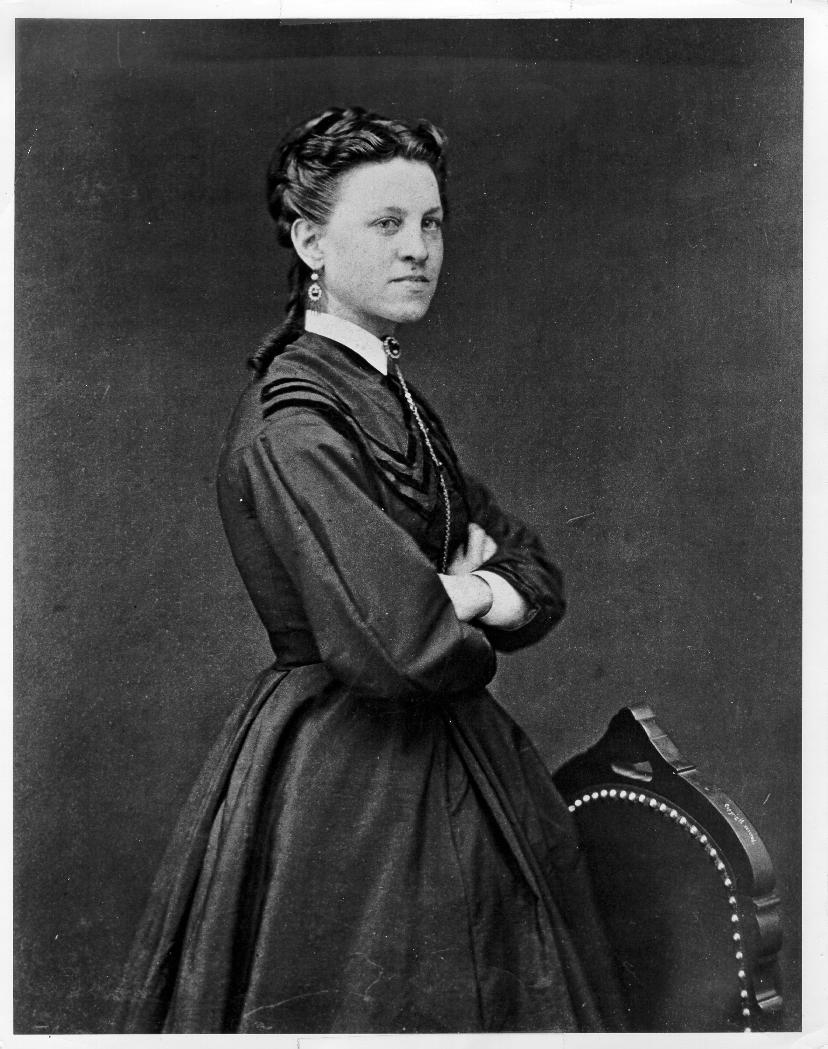
Lighthouse keeper Ida Lewis

Accommodations were designed for mixed gender crews from the start. Crew size and composition has varied over the years. When she was commissioned in 1997, she had a crew of 18, commanded by a Chief Warrant Officer. The crew of Keeper-class ships has grown to 2 officers and 22 enlisted personnel.

Ida Lewis, as all Keeper-class ships, has a strengthened "ice belt" along the waterline so that she can work on aids to navigation in ice-infested waters. Not only is the hull plating in the ice belt thicker than the rest of the hull, but framing members are closer together in areas that experience greater loads when working in ice. Higher grades of steel were used for hull plating in the ice belt to prevent cracking in cold temperatures. Her bow is sloped so that rather than smashing into ice, she ride up over it and break it with the weight of the ship. Ida Lewis is capable of breaking flat, 9-inch thick ice at 3 knots.

The ship carries a cutter boat on davits. She was originally equipped with a CB-M boat which was replaced in the mid-2010s with a CB-ATON-M boat. This was built by Metal Shark Aluminum Boats and was estimated to cost $210,000. The boat is 18 feet (5.5 m) long and are equipped with a Mercury Marine inboard/outboard diesel engine.

The ship's namesake is Ida Lewis, keeper of the Lime Rock lighthouse. She saved the lives of 24 people over her career at the lighthouse, the first at the age of 16. She served until her death at the age of 69.

== Operational history ==
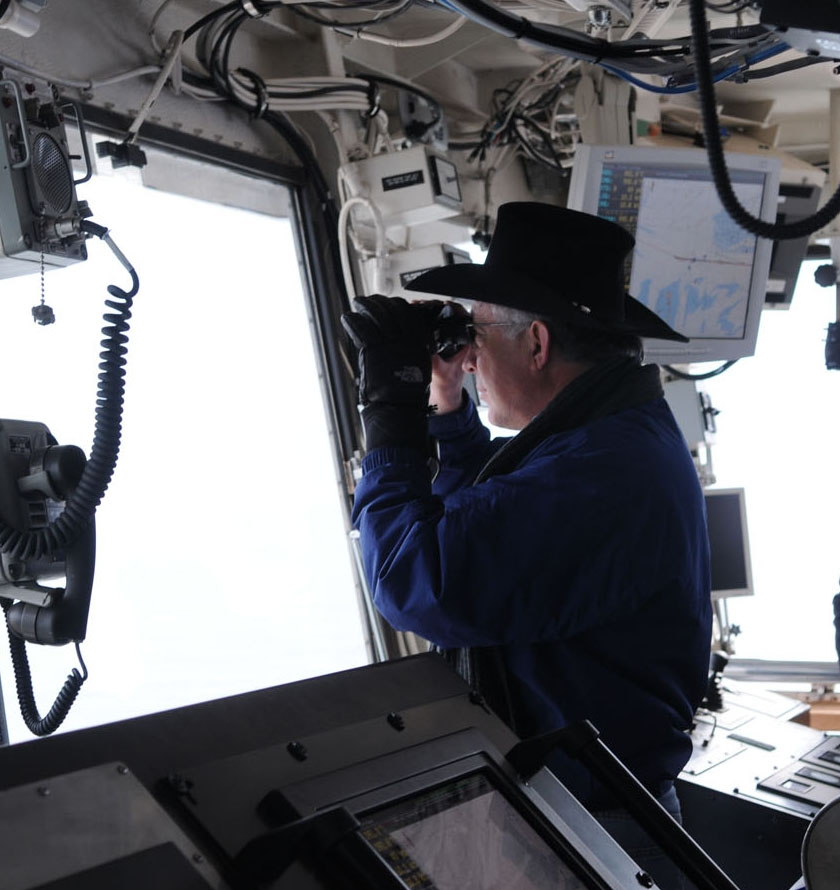
U.S. Interior Secretary Ken Salazar on board Ida Lewis, February 2010

After her launch and sea trials, Ida Lewis sailed down the Great Lakes and Saint Lawrence Seaway to reach her homeport of Newport in the fall of 1996. She was commissioned there on April 12, 1997. The ship is based at Naval Station Newport.

Ida Lewis' primary mission is to maintain 374 fixed and floating aids to navigation from Long Island Sound, New York to Cape Cod, Massachusetts. The ship also supports search and rescue, and security missions. The ship was called upon for ice-breaking duty in Narragansett Bay in 2015.

Ida Lewis participated in the 2008 New York City Fleet Week observance.

On February 2, 2010, Ida Lewis hosted Secretary of the Interior Ken Salazar on a tour of the potential location for the Cape Wind offshore wind farm in Nantucket Sound.

On July 15, 2025, Ida Lewis began a major maintenance availability at the Coast Guard Yard in Baltimore, Maryland.
