= Bailey's Beach =

Private beach and club in Newport, Rhode Island

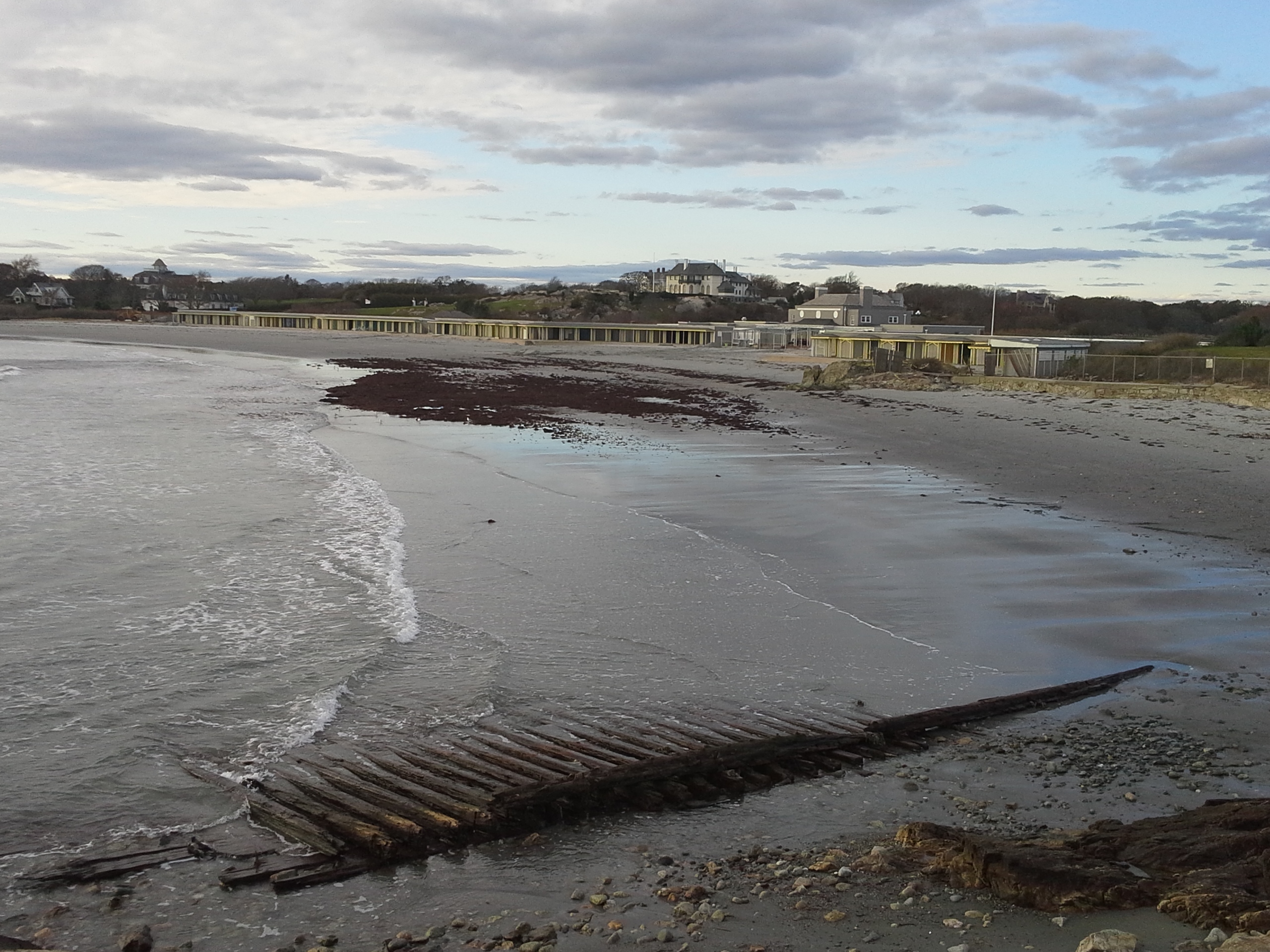
Bailey's Beach after Hurricane Sandy in 2012 with "Rejects' Beach" in the foreground

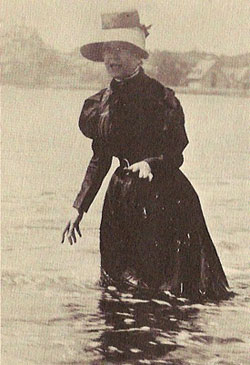
Virginia "Birdie" Graham Fair, wading in the water at Bailey's Beach

Bailey's Beach (officially named as and owned by the Spouting Rock Beach Association) is a private beach and club in Newport, Rhode Island, United States.

== History ==
According to the Providence Journal, Bailey's Beach in Newport Rhode Island was:

founded in the 1890s after new trolley service gave mill workers from Fall River ready access to Easton's Beach, a wide expanse closer to downtown Newport that the well-to-do had claimed as their own. Not wishing to associate with people who took their lunches in buckets, high society relocated several miles to Spouting Rock, smaller and often seaweedy but safely beyond the reach of trolleys. Today, approximately 500 families belong, and for the most part, new members are added only when old ones die.

According to The New York Times:

Spouting Rock Beach Association, named for a geological formation, and membership in it tends to define summer life here in ways that are sometimes difficult to comprehend, even for insiders.

The organization has attracted notable members of nearby families such as the Vanderbilt family, Astor family, and Sheldon Whitehouse. The 1938 Hurricane destroyed the original clubhouse, and the current clubhouse and cabanas appear relatively modest to passersby. Bailey's Beach was one of the centers of elite Newport social life along with other institutions such as the Redwood Library, Newport Country Club, Trinity Church, Clambake Club, Newport Reading Room, New York Yacht Club summer clubhouse and the Newport Casino.

== Membership diversity ==
Local reporters have criticized Bailey's Beach for its alleged all-white membership, saying it lacked diversity. Newsweek magazine described it as an "elite all-white beach club" in its June 21, 2021, issue. Jack Nolan, the general manager of the beach club, denied the report, telling The Boston Globe two days later that members of the club and their families include people of "many racial, religious, and ethnic backgrounds from around the world who come to Newport every summer." Questioned about his family's membership, Sen. Sheldon Whitehouse (D-RI) defended the club as "a long tradition in Rhode Island". Whitehouse also told the Globe he was not a member of the beach club, but his wife has been a member of the club for decades, and is currently one of the club's largest shareholders. He stated that the club has "no discriminatory policy," and it has members who are people of color.

Despite the exclusive status of the beach club and membership, the northeast end of the beach is open to the public and known colloquially as Rejects' Beach (or Reject's Beach or Rejects Beach).

== Notable Members ==
Notable former members include:

- William Waldorf Astor, American-English attorney, politician, hotelier, publisher and philanthropist
- John Nicholas Brown I, American book collector
- I. Townsend Burden, American industrialist
- Ogden Goelet, American socialite
- Robert Goelet, American heir, businessman and yachtsman
- Ogden Mills, American businessman
- Hermann Oelrichs, American businessman
- George L. Rives, American lawyer, politician and author
- Frederick William Vanderbilt, 19th and 20th-century American businessman
- William Kissam Vanderbilt, American businessman and horse breeder

== See also ==
- Newport Reading Room
- Ida Lewis Yacht Club
