= USCGC Abbie Burgess =

Keeper-class coastal buoy tender of the United States Coast Guard

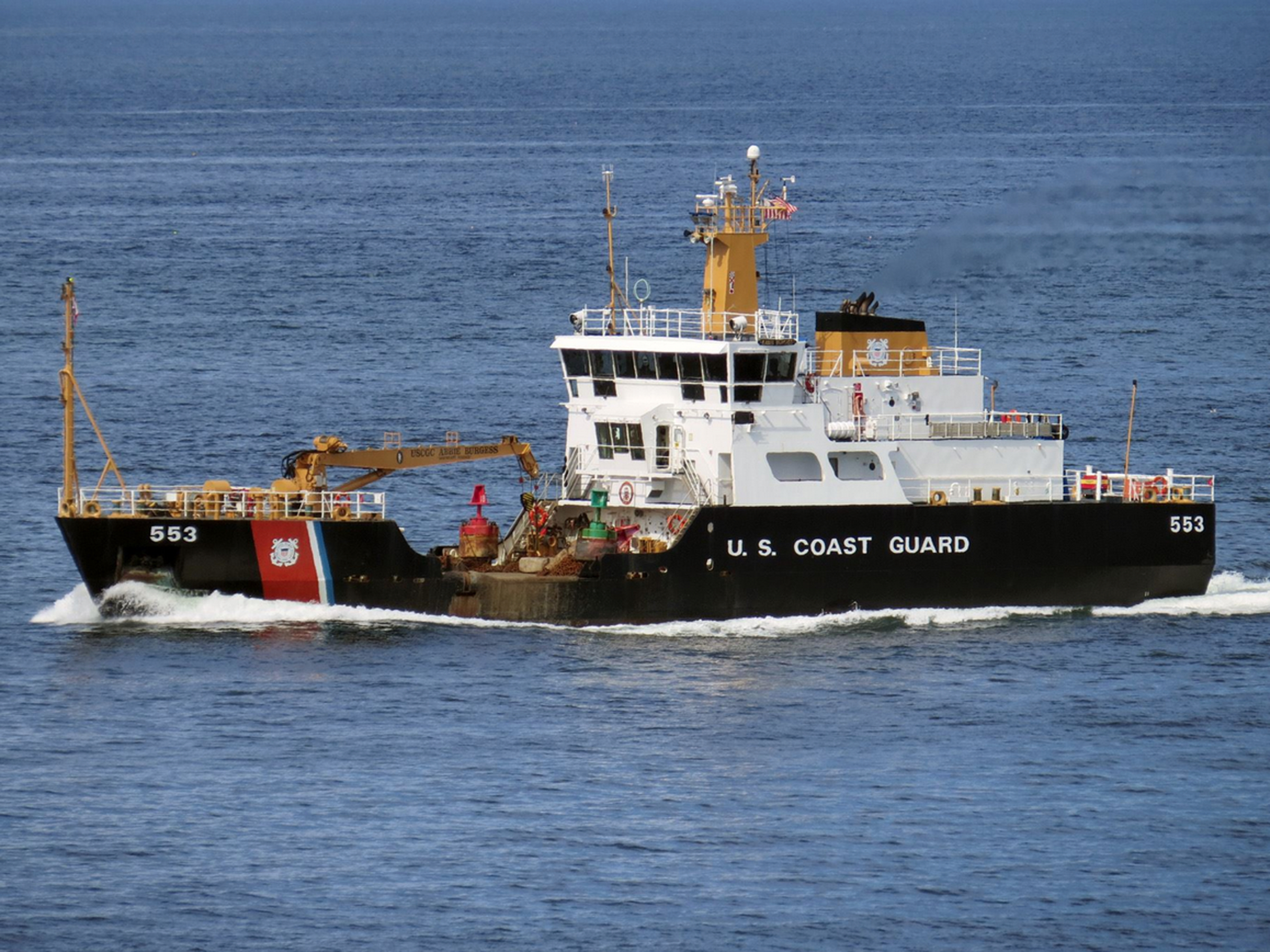
- USCGC Abbie Burgess

History

United States
- Name: Abbie Burgess
- Operator: US Coast Guard
- Builder: Marinette Marine Corporation
- Launched: 5 April 1997
- Commissioned: 31 July 1998
- Home port: Rockland, Maine
- Identification: IMO number: 9155602; Call sign: NVAF; MMSI number: 368941000
- Status: Active
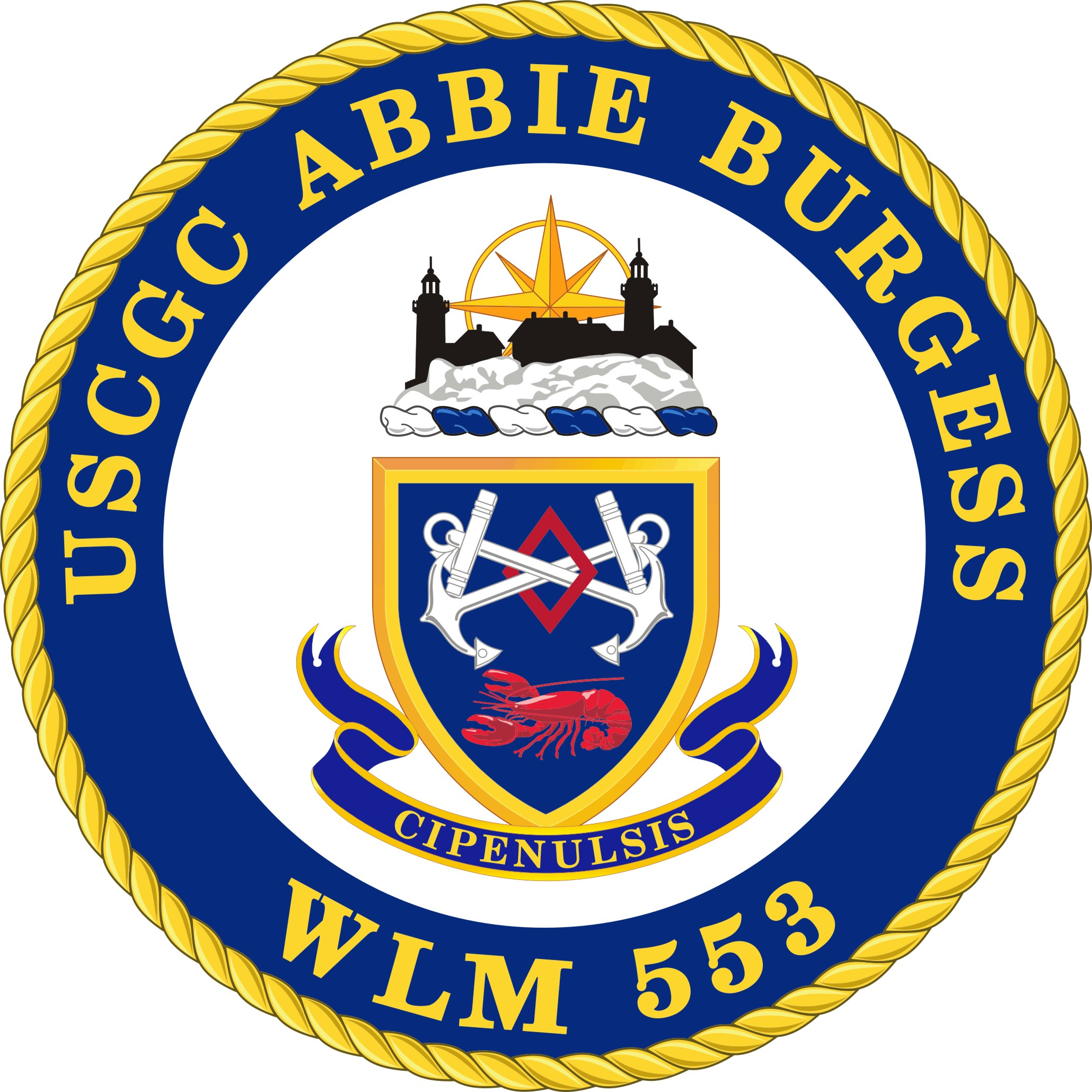
- Badge

General characteristics
- Type: Keeper-class buoy tender
- Displacement: 850 long tons (864 t) full load
- Length: 175 ft (53.3 m)
- Beam: 36 ft (11.0 m)
- Draft: 8 ft (2.4 m)
- Installed power: 2,000 hp (1,500 kW) sustained
- Propulsion: 2 × Caterpillar 3508 DITA Diesel engines; bow thruster, 500 hp (373 kW)
- Speed: 12 knots (22 km/h; 14 mph)
- Range: 2000 nautical miles at 10 kn
- Crew: 24 (2 Officers, 22 Enlisted)

USCGC Abbie Burgess (WLM-553) is a Keeper-class coastal buoy tender of the United States Coast Guard. Launched in 1997, she is home-ported in Rockland, Maine. Her primary mission is maintaining 366 aids to navigation from Boothbay Harbor, Maine to the Canadian border. Secondary missions include marine environmental protection, light icebreaking, search and rescue, and security. She is assigned to the First Coast Guard District.

== Construction and characteristics ==
On 22 June 1993 the Coast Guard awarded the contract for the Keeper-class vessels to Marinette Marine Corporation in the form of a firm order for the lead ship and options for thirteen more. The Coast Guard exercised options for three additional ships, including Abbie Burgess on 7 February 1996. She was launched on 5 April 1997 into the Menominee River. Abbie Burgess is the third of the fourteen Keeper-class ships built.

Her hull was built of welded steel plates. She is 175 feet (53 m) long, with a beam of 36 feet (11 m), and a full-load draft of 8 feet (2.4 m). Abbie Burgess displaces 850 long tons fully loaded. Her gross register tonnage is 904, and her net register tonnage is 271. The top of the mast is 58.75 feet (17.91 m) above the waterline.

Rather than building the ship from the keel up as a single unit, Marinette Marine used a modular fabrication approach. Eight large modules, or "hull blocks" were built separately and then welded together.

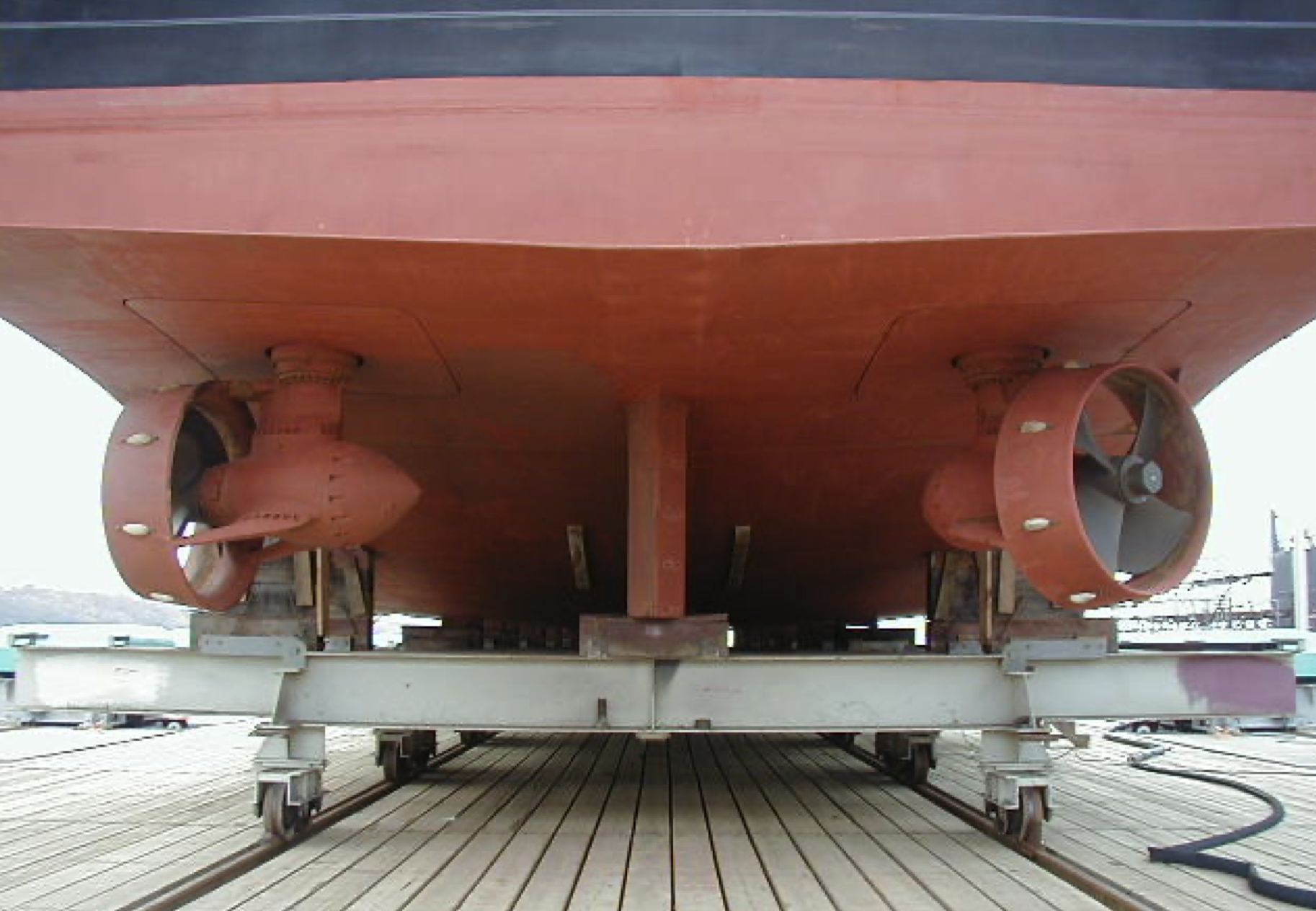
Z-drives on a Keeper-class ship

The ship has two Caterpillar 3508 DITA (direct-injection, turbocharged, aftercooled) 8-cylinder Diesel engines which produce 1000 horsepower each. These drive two Ulstein Z-drives. Keeper-class ships were the first Coast Guard cutters equipped with Z-drives, which markedly improved their maneuverability. The Z-drives have four-bladed propellers which are 57.1 inches (145 cm) in diameter and are equipped with Kort nozzles. In 1999 stainless steel cages were added around Abbie Burgess' propellers to reduce the number of lobster pot lines they fouled. They can be operated in "tiller mode" where the Z-drives turn in the same direction to steer the ship, or in "Z-conn mode" where the two Z-drives can turn in different directions to achieve specific maneuvering objectives. An implication of the Z-drives is that there is no reverse gear or rudder aboard Marcus Hanna. In order to back the ship, the Z-drives are turned 180 degrees which drives the ship stern-first even though the propellers are spinning in the same direction as they do when the ship is moving forward. Her maximum speed is 12 knots. Her tanks can hold 16,385 gallons of diesel fuel which gives her an unrefueled range of 2,000 nautical miles at 10 knots.

She has a 500 horsepower bow thruster. The Z-drives and bow thruster can be linked in a Dynamic Positioning System. This gives Abbie Burgess the ability to hold position in the water even in heavy currents, winds, and swells. This advanced capability is useful in bringing buoys aboard that can weigh more than 16,000 lbs.

Electrical power aboard is provided by three Caterpillar 3406 DITA generators which produce 285 Kw each. She also has a 210 Kw emergency generator, which is a Caterpillar 3406 DIT.

The buoy deck has 1,335 square feet (124.0 m^{2}) of working area. A crane with a boom 42 feet (13 m) long lifts buoys and their mooring anchors onto the deck. The crane can lift up to 20,000 pounds (9,100 kg).

The ships' fresh water tanks can hold 7,339 gallons. She has three ballast tanks that can be filled to maintain the ship's trim, and tanks for oily waste water, sewage, gray water, new lubrication oil, and waste oil.

Accommodations were designed for mixed gender crews from the start. Crew size and composition has varied over the years. When she first arrived in Rockland in 1997, she had an authorized complement of 18, commanded by a chief warrant officer. By 2009, her crew had been increases to 24.

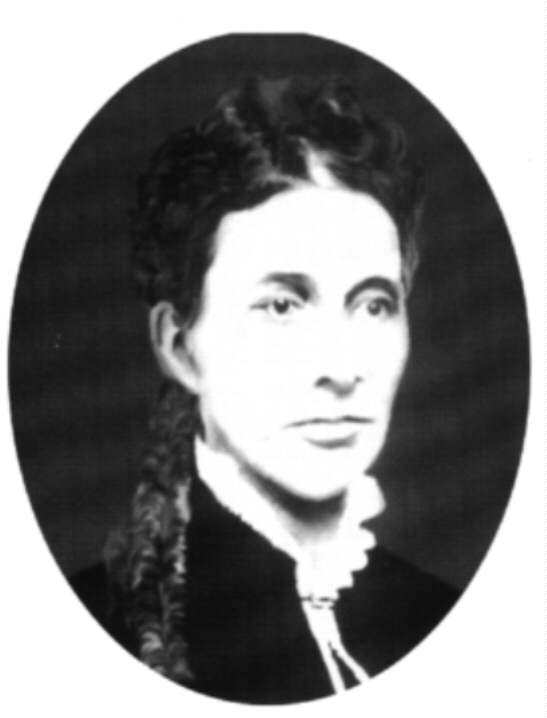
Lighthouse keeper Abbie Burgess

Abbie Burgess, as all Keeper-class ships, has a strengthened "ice belt" along the waterline so that she can work on aids to navigation in ice-infested waters. Not only is the hull plating in the ice belt thicker than the rest of the hull, but framing members are closer together in areas that experience greater loads when working in ice. Higher grades of steel were used for hull plating in the ice belt to prevent cracking in cold temperatures. Her bow is sloped so that rather than smashing into ice, she rides up over it to break it with the weight of the ship. Abbie Burgess is capable of breaking flat, 9-inch thick ice at 3 knots.

The ship carries a cutter boat on davits. She was originally equipped with a CB-M boat which was replaced in the mid-2010s with a CB-ATON-M boat. This was built by Metal Shark Aluminum Boats and was estimated to cost $210,000. The boat is 18 feet (5.5 m) long and are equipped with a Mercury Marine inboard/outboard diesel engine.

The ship's namesake is lighthouse keeper Abbie Burgess. She was a lighthouse keeper on the Maine coast for most of the last half of the nineteenth century. Her most famous act of service took place when she was just a teenager. Her father was appointed keeper of the Matinicus Rock lighthouse in 1853. The regular supply ship to the island was late, so in January 1856 he rowed to the mainland to pick up supplies for his family and to maintain the light. While he was gone, a strong storm blew in. Hurricane-force winds, snow, and large waves pounded Matinicus Rock. The bad weather prevented her father's return, leaving 17-year-old Abbie to maintain the lights for a month during one of the worst storms of the century.

Abbie Burgess replaced USCGC White Lupine, which was decommissioned in 1998.

== Operational history ==
After her launch and builder's trials, the Coast Guard accepted the ship and placed her in commission-special status on 19 September 1997. Her crew was trained by Marinette personnel and she sailed from Lake Michigan through the Great Lakes to her new homeport. She was commissioned at a ceremony in Rockport on 31 July 1998.

Abbie Burgess' buoy tending involves lifting them onto her deck where marine growth is scraped and pressure washed off, inspecting the buoy itself, and replacing lights, solar cells, and radar transponders. The mooring chain or synthetic cable is inspected and replaced as needed. The concrete block mooring anchor is also inspected. The coast of northern New England is prone to difficult weather that requires extra maintenance of the buoys that are assigned to Abbie Burgess. For example, every spring the tender must replace buoys damaged by ice in the Penobscot River. A strong nor'easter in April 2007 damaged or displaced 70 aids to navigation which Abbie Burgess, and USCGC Marcus Hanna were dispatched to repair. The ship has also been dispatched to other Coast Guard districts to assist in seasonal or one-time events. For example, in 2018 Abbie Burgess was sent to the Great Lakes on a 37-day deployment to assist in replacing summer buoys with more ice-resistant winter buoys.

The bulk of Abbie Burgess' year is spent at sea tending her buoys, or in port maintaining the ship. She has been asked to perform other missions, as described below.

=== Search and rescue ===
In May 2006 the three-masted sailing ship RawFaith, was dismasted in a gale off the Maine coast. Abbie Burgess teamed with USCGC Seneca to tow the ship back to Rockland.

=== Marine environmental protection ===
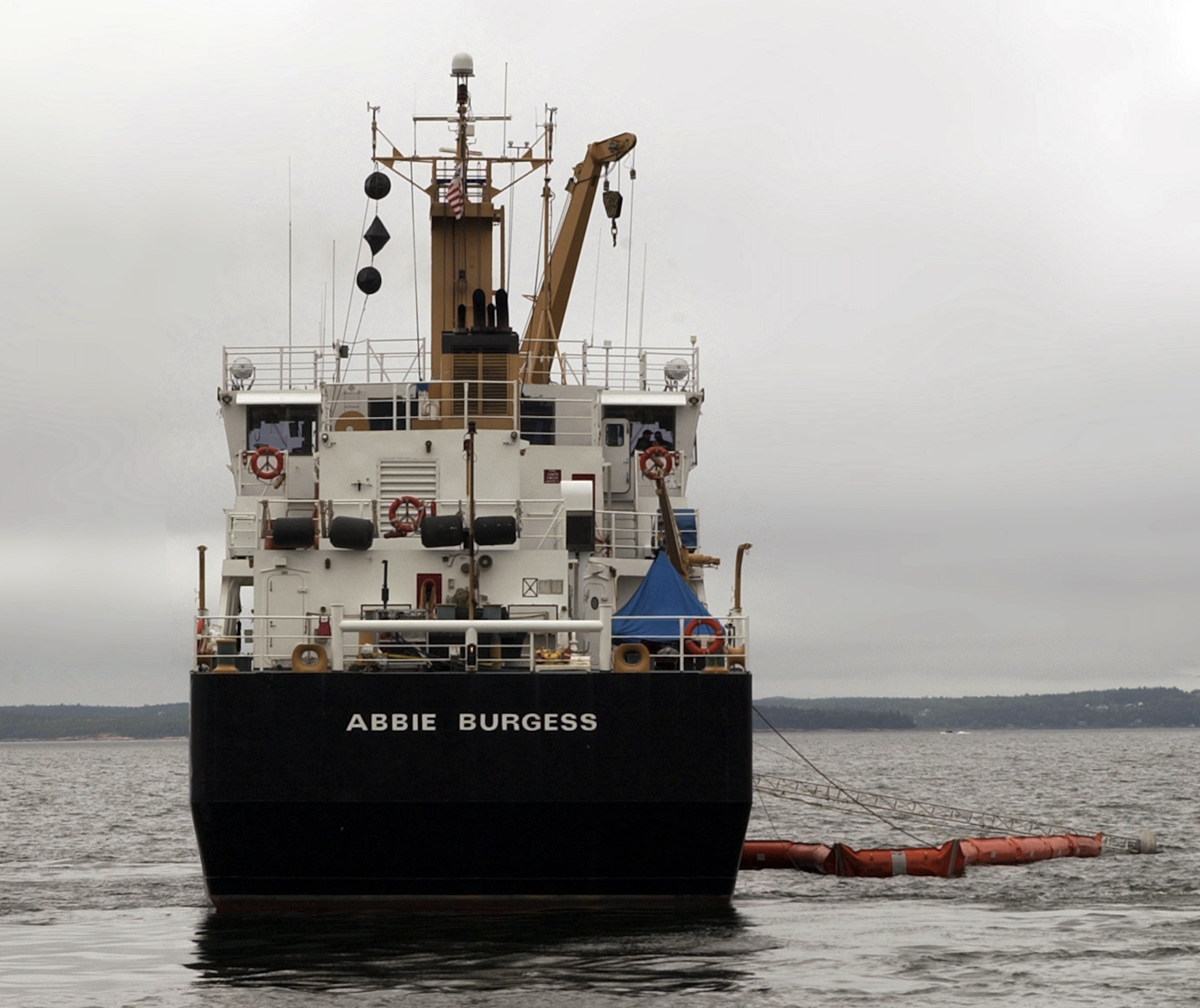
Abbie Burgess training on oil spill recovery

Oil, asphalt, and other hazardous substances are transported in the Penobscot River. Significant changes in currents during spring freshets caused by rapid snowmelt can be a hazard for vessels on the river. In April 2005, Abbie Burgess set four NOAA current monitoring stations in the river to learn more about these potentially dangerous flows. Later in 2005, Abbie Burgess participated in a joint U.S.-Canada oil spill exercise, with the cutter deploying in Frenchman Bay, Maine.

Abbie Burgess served as a dive platform for an archeological survey of the Minot's Ledge Lighthouse, which was destroyed in a storm in 1851. In 2007, Coast Guard divers from the Maritime Safety and Security team searched the sea floor for evidence of the lighthouse. The ship's crane was used to lower a commemorative plaque to the bottom to commemorate the two lighthouse keepers who were killed.

=== Security ===
In July 2000, Abbie Burgess provided security for the parade of tall ships at OpSail 2000 Connecticut on the Thames River. In 2004 she was deployed to New York Harbor to support emergency evacuation plans for the Republican national convention.

Along with US and Canadian naval units, Abbie Burgess participated in a homeland security exercise called Frontier Sentinel in 2008.

=== Public engagement ===
The Coast Guard has offered tours aboard Abbie Burgess on several occasions. These include:

- New London, Connecticut on 3 and 4 October 2007
- Maine Lobster Festival in 2007
- New York Fleet Week in 2010
- Maine bicentennial celebration in Portland in 2021
