= Abbie Burgess =

American lighthouse keeper (1839–1892)

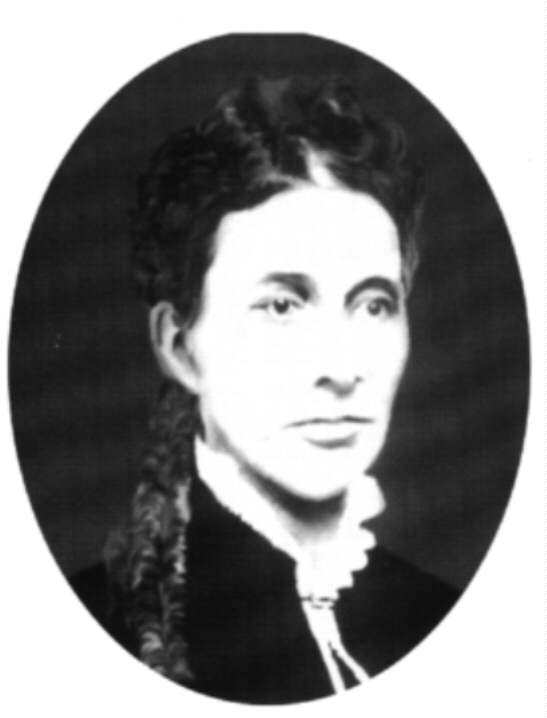
- Born: Abigail E Burgess; August 1, 1839; Rockland, Maine, U.S.
- Died: June 16, 1892 (aged 52); Portland, Maine, U.S.
- Occupation: Lighthouse keeper
- Spouse: Isaac Grant (m. 1860)
- Children: 4

Abigail E Grant (née Burgess; August 1, 1839 – June 16, 1892) was an American lighthouse keeper known for her bravery in tending the Matinicus Rock Light in Maine during a raging winter storm in 1856. She did so for nearly a month while her father, the head keeper, was away from the island. Her heroic actions attracted much attention and she was soon a popular heroine.

== Biography ==
Abbie was the fourth of nine children of Samuel and Thankful (Phinney) Burgess, who moved to Matinicus Rock in 1853 to become its lighthouse keeper. Although only 15, she soon took over duties of tending the lighthouse so that Samuel could fish and catch lobster, which he sold in Rockland, Maine, 25 miles (40 km) away. In the lighthouse, she found a lightkeeper's log, which detailed great storms that had struck Matinicus Rock, including one in 1839 that had destroyed the original lighthouse.

The family lived in a home near the new lighthouse, and Abbie became concerned that if a gale came, it could get damaged, and Thankful would be unable to be moved. In December 1855 she transferred Thankful's bedroom to a small room in the lighthouse itself. Less than a month later a devastating gale struck.

=== Gale of 1856 ===
In January 1856, Samuel left Abbie, Thankful, and her younger sisters to take care of the lighthouse while he went to obtain supplies in Rockland. The lighthouse cutter that was supposed to have supplied the family had not shown up for its September delivery, and food and oil for the lights were running low. He feared that the family might be stuck on the island throughout the winter with no supplies. He charged Abbie with the care of both her family and the lighthouse.

Almost as soon as he had left, the wind shifted and a gale began. It blew for three days, with waves so high they overran the island with knee-deep water. The home intended for the family was completely washed away. Abbie and her sisters had to secure the lighthouse windows to keep the waves from breaking them in. The lower level flooded, and they were forced to seek refuge in the north lighthouse tower. Abbie even managed to rescue all but one of their chickens. Throughout this ordeal she kept the lights burning.

Even after the gale subsided, the waves were too treacherous for Samuel to return for another three weeks. The family subsisted on one cup of cornmeal mush and one egg per day until Samuel was able to return with supplies.

=== Later life ===
Samuel lost his position as lighthouse keeper in 1861 for not supporting Abraham Lincoln. (At the time lighthouse keepers were presidential appointees.) He was replaced by Captain John Grant. Abbie, however, stayed on to train him and fell in love with his youngest son, Isaac. They were eventually married, and served as assistant keepers on Matinicus Rock for fourteen years, where they had four sons. They were then moved to Whitehead Light off St. George, Maine, where they served as lighthouse keepers for fifteen years before retiring in 1890.

Abbie died in Portland, Maine in 1892. Maritime historian Edward Rowe Snow located her grave in Forest Hills Cemetery in South Thomaston, Maine and in 1945 arranged for a memorial in the form of an aluminum scale replica lighthouse to be placed over it.

== Legacy ==
Abbie is the subject of several books, including the children's books Keep the Lights Burning, Abbie by Peter Roop, Connie Roop, and Peter E. Hanson, which was featured as the title book of an episode of the children's television program Reading Rainbow, and Abbie Against the Storm by Marcia Vaughan and illustrated by Bill Farnsworth. Abbie is also the subject of Your Story Hour's family-friendly radio drama, Abbie, the Lighthouse Keeper's Daughter on Exciting Events, CD 1, published in 2014.

The folk song "Lighthouse Keeper" by Neptune's Car was inspired by the experiences of women lighthouse tenders including Abbie, Ida Lewis, and Katherine Walker.

In 1998, the United States Coast Guard commissioned Cutter Abbie Burgess (WLM-553), a 175' Keeper-class buoy tender. She is currently stationed in Rockland.

In 2023, the Chance Theater in Anaheim, CA presented a play, Matinicus: The Story of Abigail Burgess, written by Jenny Connell Davis, about Abbie's time on Matinicus Rock with her family.
