= Gull Rock National Park =

National park in Western Australia

- IUCN category II (national park)
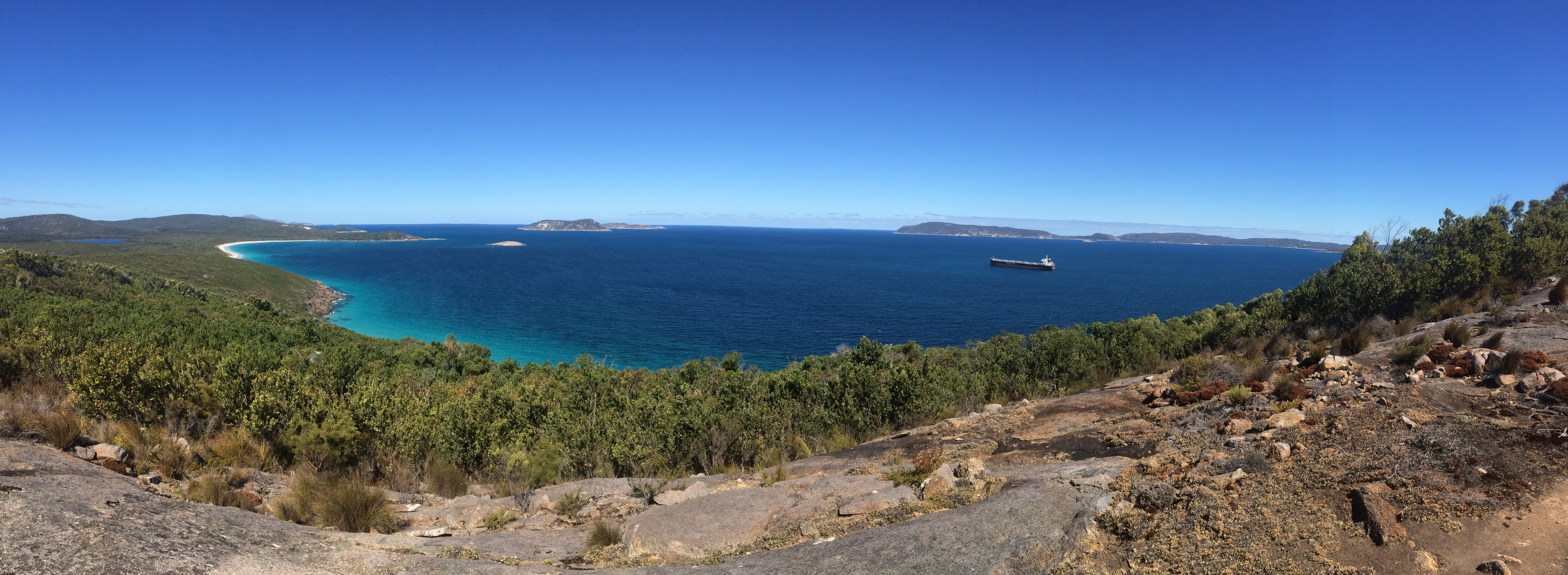
- King George Sound from Gull Rock National Park

- Location within Western Australia
- Location: Western Australia
- Nearest city: Albany
- Coordinates: 35°00′27″S 118°00′12″E
- Area: 21.04 km^{2} (8.12 sq mi)
- Established: 2006
- Governing body: Department of Environment and Conservation

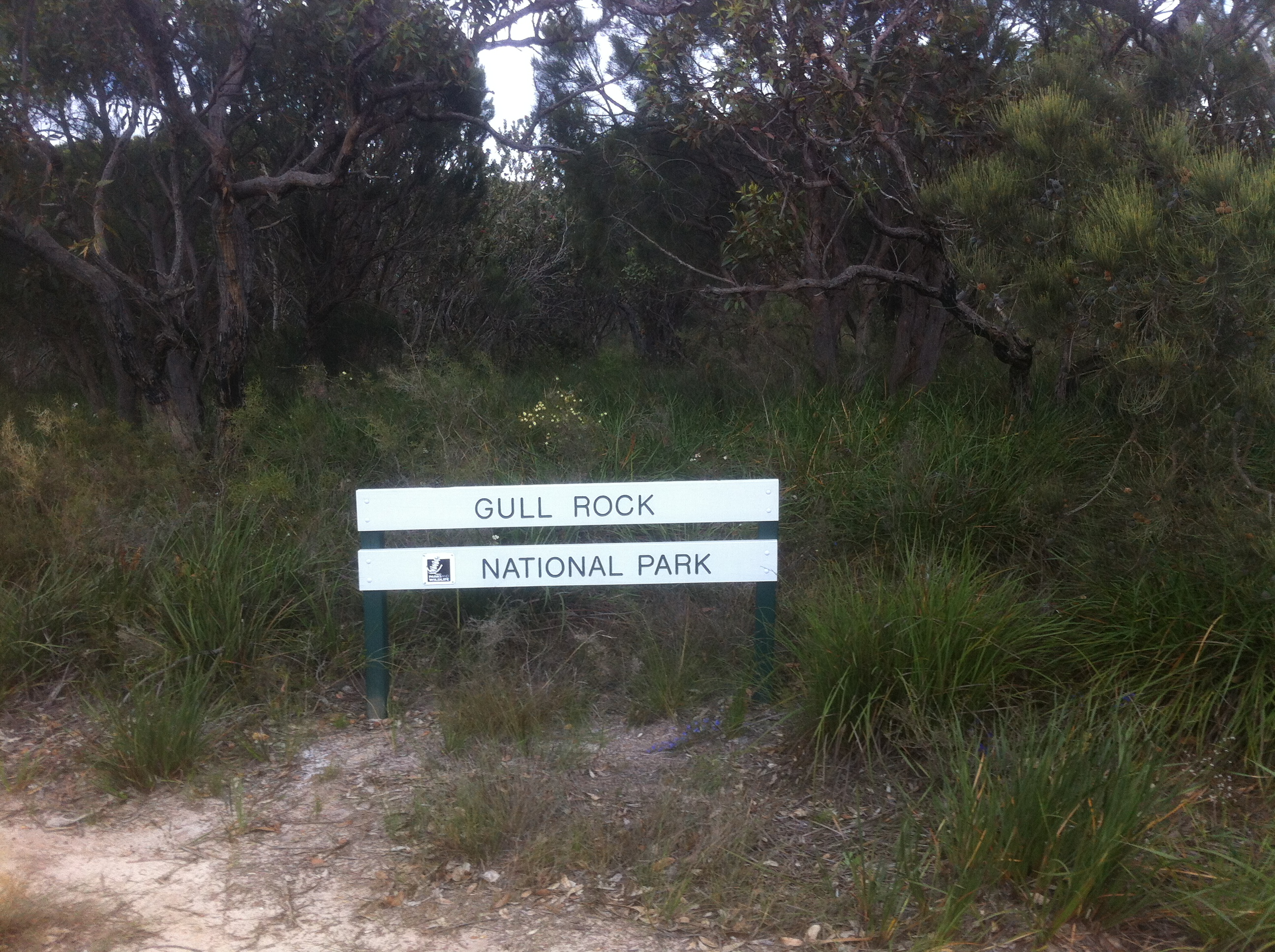
Signage at entry to park

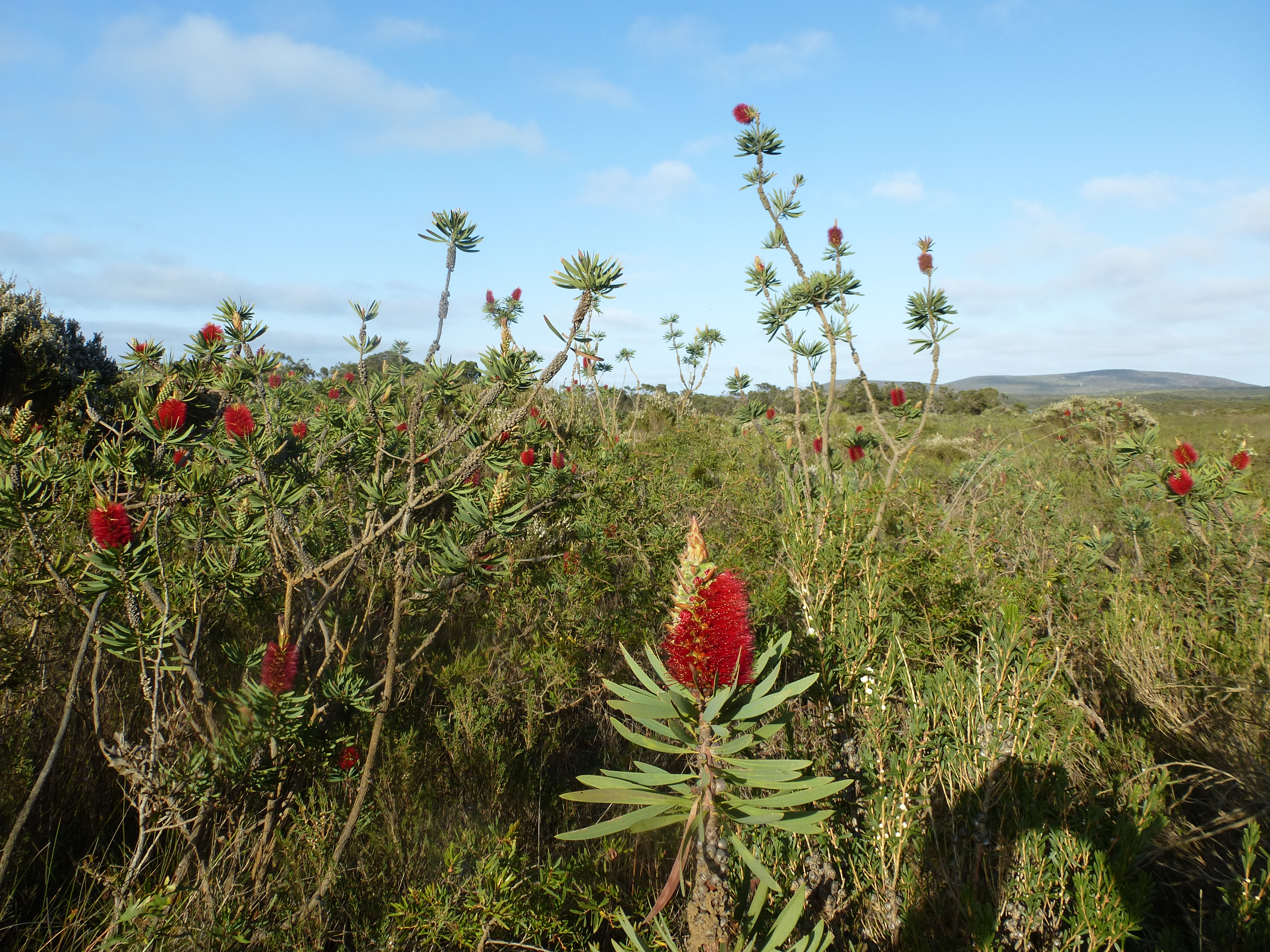
Melaleuca glauca habit in the park

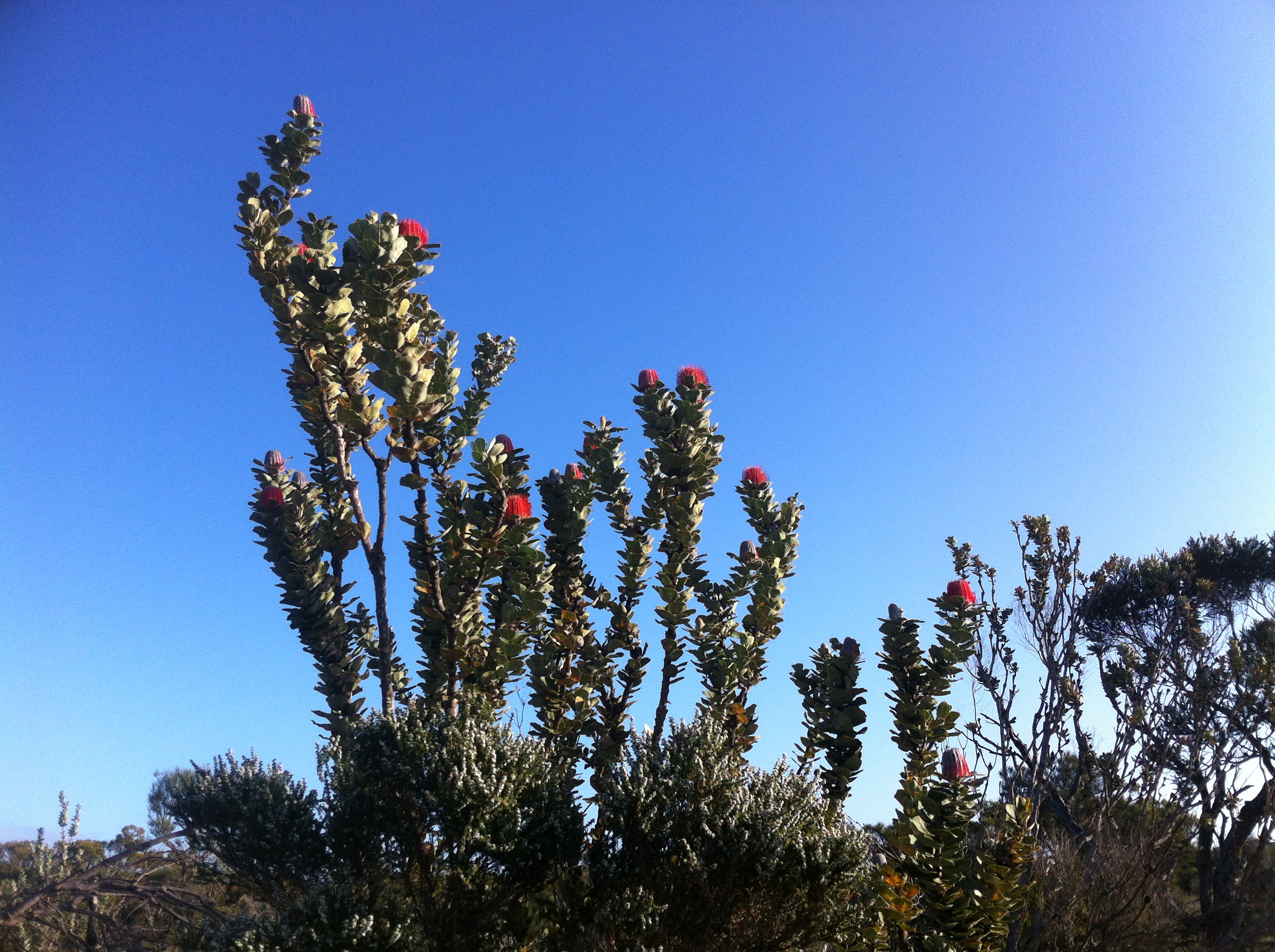
Banksia coccinea in the park

Gull Rock National Park is a small national park situated 25 km (16 mi) east of Albany in Western Australia. It was established in 2006, becoming Western Australia's 97th national park in the process. It is around 2,593 hectares (6,407 acres) in area.

== Location ==
The area is backed by King George Sound to the south, Oyster Harbour to the west, Taylor Inlet to the east and farmland to the north. The park takes its name from a small island off Ledge Beach, which is not part of the park. Boiler Bay is at the eastern edge of Ledge Beach.

The Mount Martin Botanical Reserve is adjacent to the western boundary and Two Peoples Bay Nature Reserve is approximately 10 kilometres (6 mi) to the east of the park.

== Description ==
The area is an almost unspoilt example of coastal east Kalgan vegetation system. Composed of granite headlands separated by sandy beaches with lakes and interdunal wetlands, the area contains a number of specific ecosystems. Rocky granite areas exist, including Mount Taylor and Mount Martin, both of which are part of the Gardner Landform unit.

The diverse landforms and soils support an array of different habitats and a large number of floral species. A complex patchwork of forest, woodlands, wetlands, sedges, granite shrublands and coastal heath is found within the park.

== Flora and fauna ==
Endangered species such as the noisy scrub-bird, western bristlebird and the western whipbird are known to inhabit the area. The endangered Western ringtail possum is also frequently sighted in the area.

Many rare plant species are also found in the National Park. Examples include Corybas limpidus, Adenanthos cunninghamii, Banksia verticillata and Stylidium plantagineum.

Areas of banksia woodland, sheoak forest, open heath and grassed dunes can all be found within the park. Notable flora include Banksia coccinea, Hakea elliptica, Allocasuarina trichodon, Agonis marginata and Dryandra formosa. The area is home to the most significant remaining stands of scarlet banksia, Banksia coccinea, in the region; however, this community is threatened by Phytophthora dieback.

Melaleuca striata coastal heath grows on the lower elevations of Mount Taylor. Melaleuca striata, Banksia attenuata and Banksia coccinea are present on the heath; however, their growth is stunted by the salt laden air. Anarthria scabra is predominant in the sedgeland, with Adenanthos cuneatus, Astroloma baxteri, Hypocalymma strictum, Hypolaena exsulca, Isopogon cuneatus, Lyginia barbata, Melaleuca thymoides, and Petrophile rigida also present.

The rare and ancient Main's assassin spider, currently listed as threatened, was found to inhabit the park during a survey conducted in 2008.
