= Ida Lewis Yacht Club =

Social club in Newport, Rhode Island

Coordinates: 41.47694°N 71.32549°W

- Burgee
- Short name: IDA
- Founded: 1928; 98 years ago
- Location: Lime Rocks, Newport, Rhode Island
- Website: www.ilyc.org

The Ida Lewis Yacht Club is a private social club and yacht club based in Newport, Rhode Island. It was founded in 1928 and is headquartered at the Lime Rock Light. Membership in the club is by invitation only.

== Background ==
The yacht club takes its name from Ida Lewis, a lighthouse keeper of the Lime Rock Light. She was known for her heroism and saving the lives of 18 persons during her 42 years as a lighthouse keeper.

In the 1920s, the land where the Lime Rock light sits was sold to a group of sportsmen for $7,200 organized under the "Narragansett Bay Regatta Association." In 1928 the group named themselves the Ida Lewis Yacht Club. Today, the Lime Rock Light is used as the member's clubhouse.

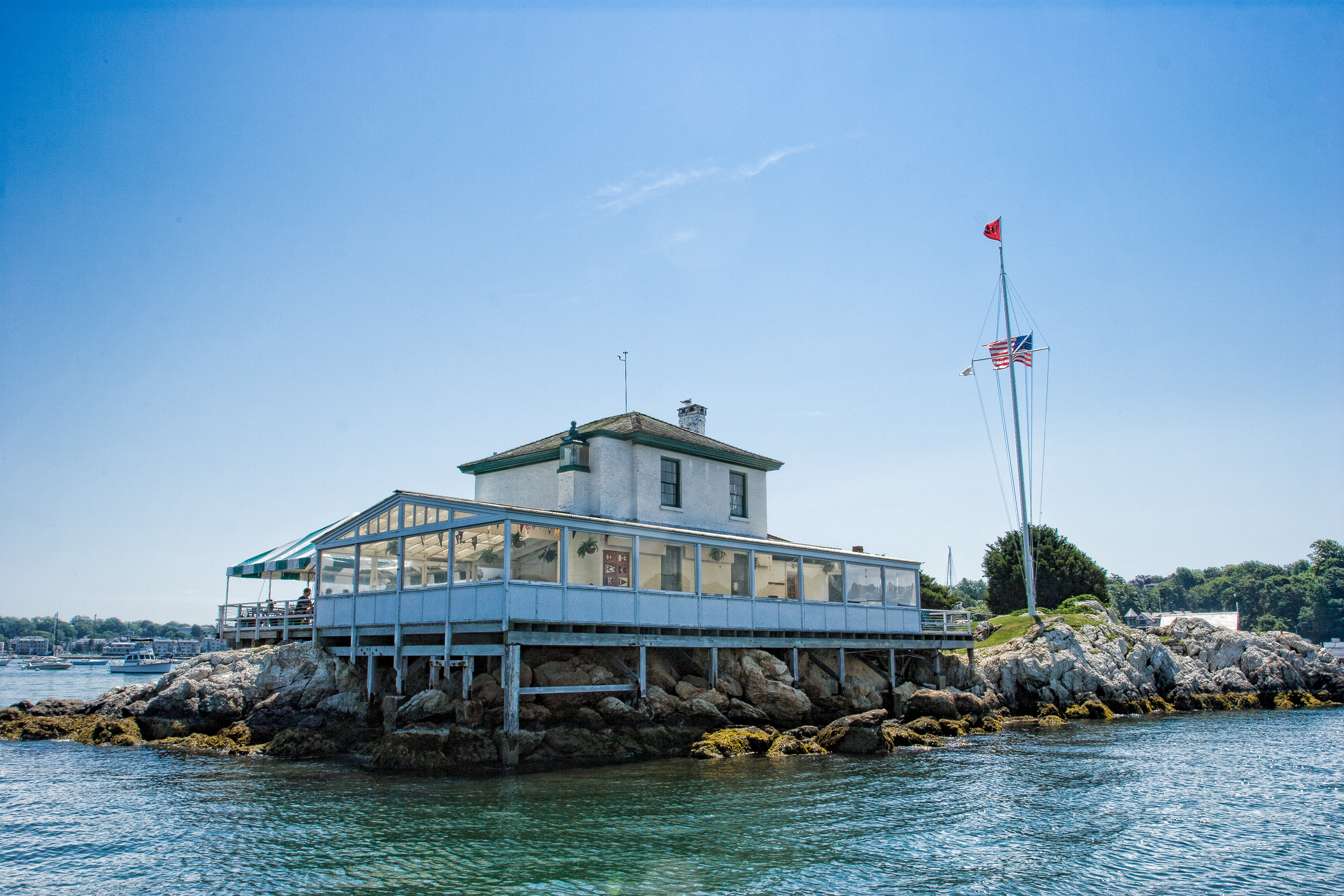
Clubhouse of the Ida Lewis Yacht Club, Newport, Rhode Island

The club's first Commodore was Arthur Curtiss James and the Vice Commodore was Marion Eppley. In 2004, Sanderson Carney became the first female Commodore of the Ida Lewis Yacht Club.

Today the club operates seasonally, from May through October. It describes itself as a "family friendly" club, offering sailing courses for children of members and the community. Membership is restricted to those that are well-known and endorsed by current members and who also have an interest in yachting. The club's facilities, such as docks, launches, and clubhouse are reserved for the exclusive use of members and their guests.

=== Regattas ===
The club hosts several races and regattas each year, including the 12 Metre North American Championships. In 2020, the Ida Lewis Yacht Club received US Sailing's St. Petersburg Yacht Club Trophy for Excellence in Race Management for their stewardship of the 12 Metre World Championship Regatta.

In August, the club hosts the Ida Lewis Distance Race, a 24-hour offshore race for different yacht classes. In 2024, 49 teams took part in the event.

== Whitehouse diversity controversy ==
In 2020, Rhode Island Democratic Senator Sheldon Whitehouse came under scrutiny by conservative critics for his membership in the Ida Lewis Yacht Club. In response, Whitehouse said, "Failing to address the sailing club's lack of diversity is squarely on me, and something for which I am sorry. I commit to working with the club and the community to build a more inclusive membership and to better connect with the local community."

== Notable members ==
- J.C. Wylie, Rear Admiral U.S. Navy
- Garry Hoyt, Olympic sailor and sailing designer
- Ken Read, American yachtsman
- John Nicholas Brown II, United States Assistant Secretary of the Navy

== See also ==
- Bailey's Beach Club
- New York Yacht Club, former sister club to the ILYC
