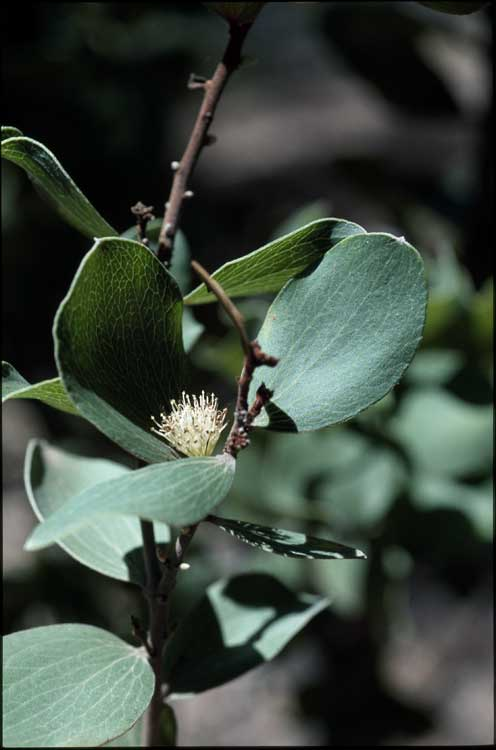
- Hakea elliptica in the ANBG

Scientific classification
- Kingdom: Plantae
- Clade: Tracheophytes
- Clade: Angiosperms
- Clade: Eudicots
- Order: Proteales
- Family: Proteaceae
- Genus: Hakea
- Species: H. elliptica

Binomial name
- Hakea elliptica (Sm.) R.Br.
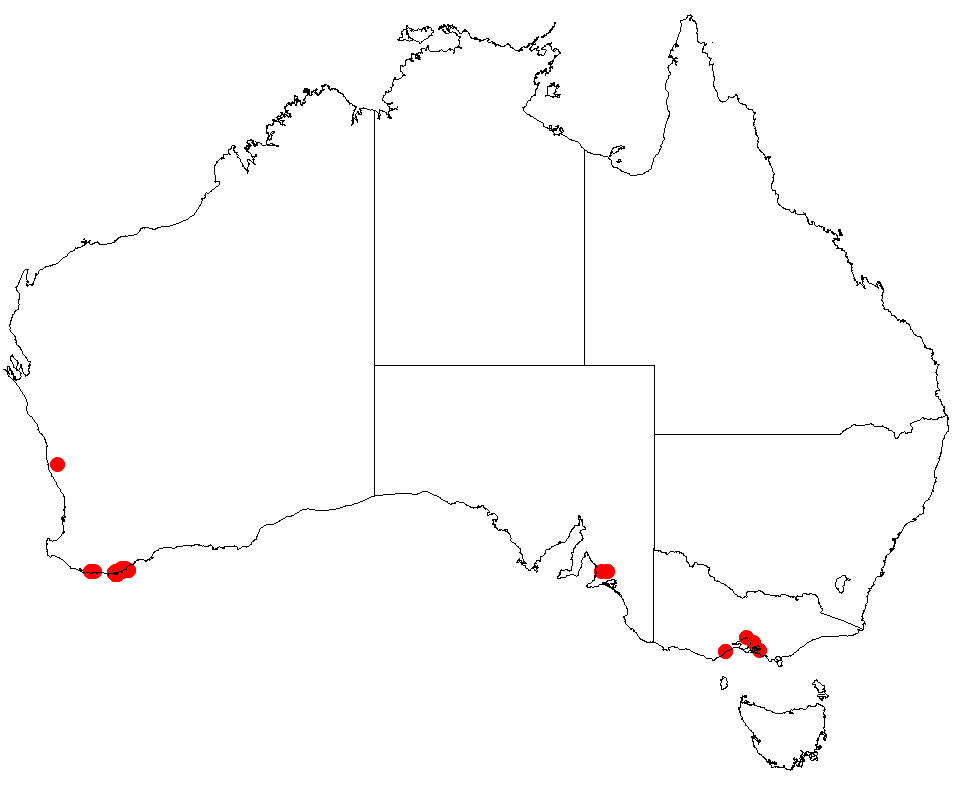
- Occurrence data from AVH

= Hakea elliptica =

Species of shrub endemic to Western Australia

Hakea elliptica, commonly known as the oval-leaf hakea, is a species of flowering plant in the family Proteaceae. It is a shrub endemic to Western Australia. A fast growing adaptable species with ornamental wavy leaves, golden bronze new growth and an abundance of showy white flowers. A good wildlife habitat due to its dense form with foliage to ground level.

== Description ==
Hakea elliptica is a dense, rounded, erect non-lignotuberous shrub or small tree that typically grows to a height of 2 to 4 metres (7 to 13 ft). The smaller branches are covered with densely matted reddish brown hairs near flowering. The dark green leaves are alternately arranged with an elliptic to broadly elliptic shape ending in a sharp point. The leaves are flat, 4.5 to 9.5 centimetres (1.8 to 3.7 in) long and 1.5 to 5.5 cm (0.59 to 2.17 in) wide. The leaf blade is wavy and venation is conspicuous with several longitudinal veins. New growth is an attractive bronze-brown colour. The solitary inflorescence consists of 35–40 strongly scented cream-white flowers in clusters in the leaf axils. Each flower is on a smooth stalk 8 mm (0.31 in) long. The pedicel is smooth and the perianth cream-white and about 4 mm (0.16 in) long. The style is long, thin and 6–7.5 mm (0.24–0.30 in) long. Flowering occurs from November to February. The egg-shaped fruit are 3 to 3.7 cm (1.18 to 1.46 in) long and 1.8 to 2.2 cm (0.71 to 0.87 in) wide tapering to a short upturned beak. The fruit surface is smooth but uneven. The ovate seeds are blackish brown.

== Taxonomy and naming ==
Hakea elliptica was initially described as Conchium ellipticum in 1807 by James Edward Smith in the work Conchium. The Cyclopaed, Smith then revised the name the following year as Conchium elliptica in A botanical sketch of the genus Conchium and published in Transactions of the Linnean Society of London. Robert Brown reclassified the species in 1810 to the genus Hakea and was published in Transactions of the Linnean Society of London. The type specimen was collected from King George Sound in 1803 by A.Maxwell. The specific epithet (elliptica) refers to the shape of the leaves.

== Distribution and habitat ==
It is found in an area along the south coast in the Great Southern region of Western Australia between Denmark and just east of Albany where it grows on sandy soils over granite. It is often found amongst coastal heath communities.
