= Lime Rock (island) =

Island in Newport County, Rhode Island, United States

Coordinates: 41.4775°N 71.326°W

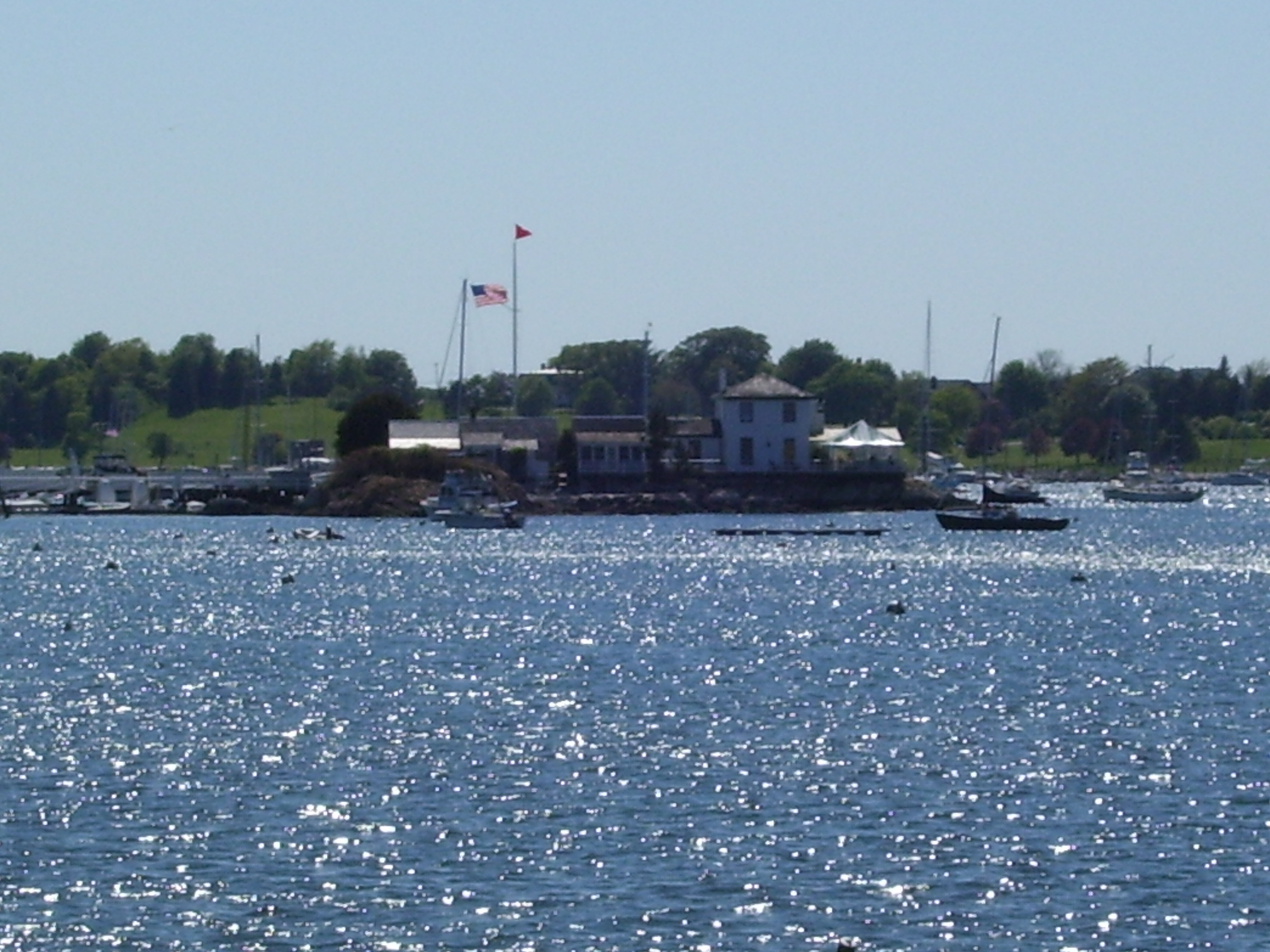
Lime Rock Island with Ida Lewis Yacht Club and Newport, Rhode Island in the background

Lime Rock is an island located 600 feet offshore in Newport Harbor, in Narragansett Bay, in the U.S. state of Rhode Island. It was made famous by Ida Lewis, the lighthouse keeper of the tower built on it in 1854 which is now known as Ida Lewis Rock Light. In 1927 the island was sold to a Yacht Club and was connected to Aquidneck Island by a small causeway. A steel tower light was placed in front of the building, which remained an active light until 1963.
