= Nanarup Beach =

Beach in Western Australia

Coordinates: 34.99311°S 118.07636°E

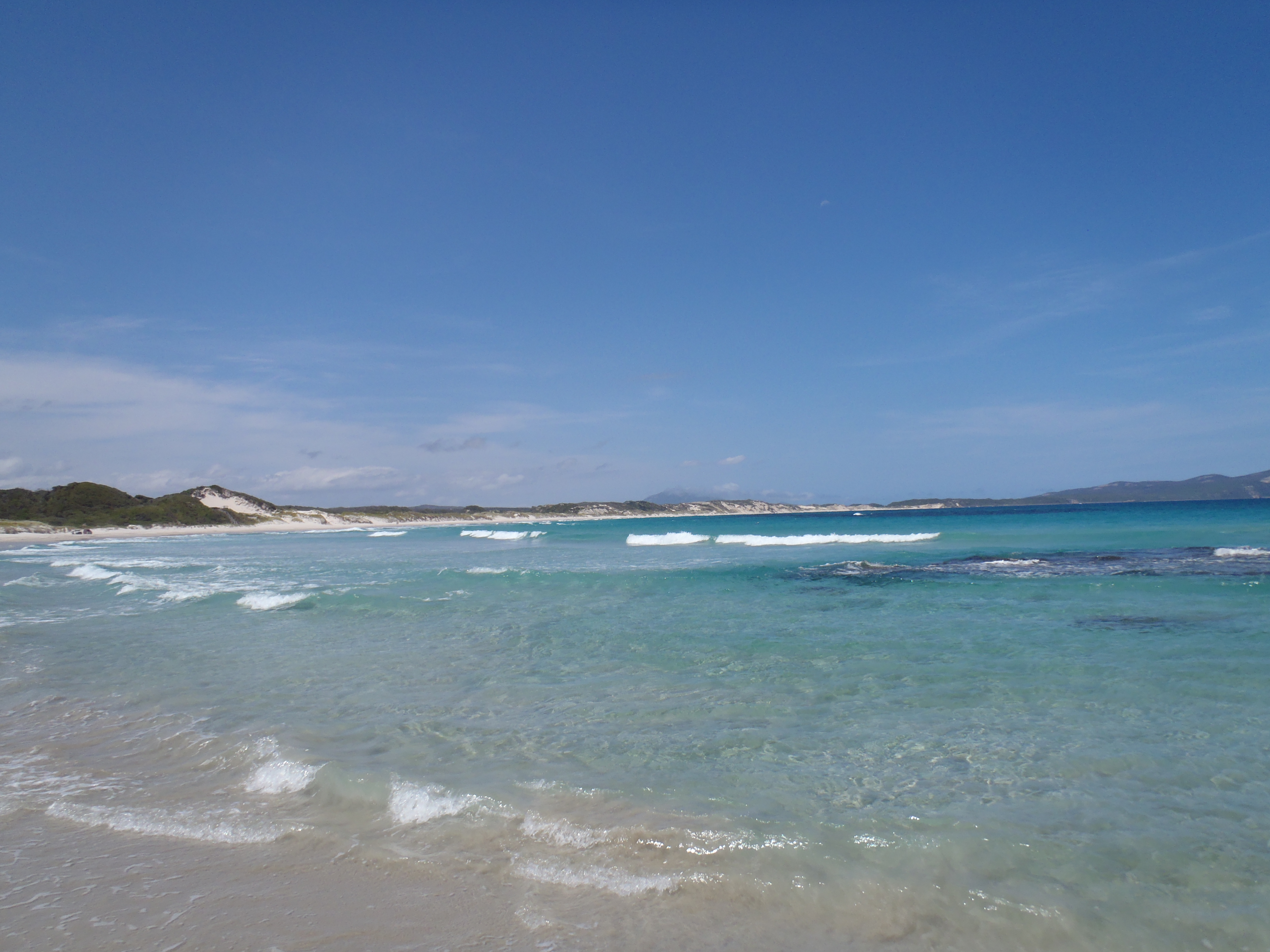
View of Nanarup Beach from western end

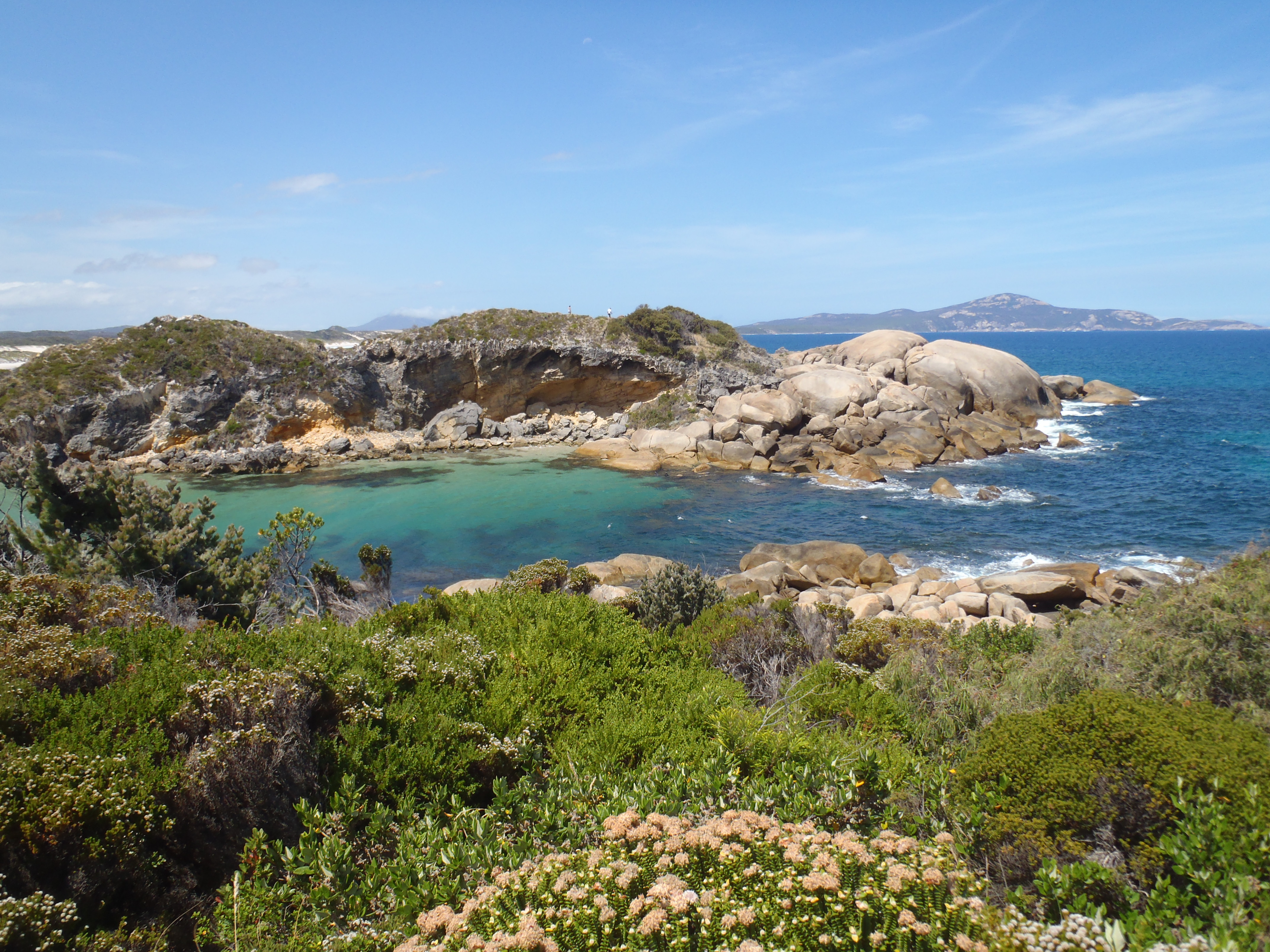
Islet Point

Nanarup Beach is a beach in Nanarup, in the Great Southern region of Western Australia, 20 kilometres (12 mi) east of Albany.

The beach is white sand and has stairway access at the western end where Taylor Inlet discharges into the ocean. Toilets, a picnic area and a former caravan park are also situated near the western end of the beach. Four-wheel drive vehicles are permitted on the beach and can drive towards Two Peoples Bay.

The beach is not patrolled by surf lifesavers and can be dangerous due to the presence of many rips along the beach. A man drowned at Nanarup in 2013 after being swept off the rocks while fishing. The area is especially popular for surfing and fishing.

Approximately 4.2 kilometres (3 mi) in length, Nanarup has scattered beachrock reefs at the eastern end for a distance of about 1.0 kilometre (1 mi) then curves to the southwest; the remaining length is a wave dominated surf zone that extends as far as the inlet. The beach is mostly backed by scarped 12-metre (40 ft) calcarenite bluffs to the east and unstable dunes to the west.

The far western end of the beach has the 20-metre (66 ft) granite boulders of Islet Point connected to the shore by a small tombolo, which forms a sheltered pool area that is suitable for safe swimming.
