= Gull Rocks Light =

- Location: Narragansett Bay near Newport, Rhode Island
- Coordinates: 41°30′8.5″N 71°19′59″W

Tower
- Construction: Wood frame
- Automated: 1960
- Height: 33 feet (10 m)
- Shape: A-frame house with skeleton tower added in 1928

Light
- First lit: 1887
- Deactivated: 1969
- Lens: two lens lanterns

The Gull Rocks Light was a lighthouse at the entrance to Newport harbor northwest of Rose Island. A unique A-frame structure, it was supplemented with a skeleton tower in 1928.

== History ==
The Gull Rocks obstruct the passage north of Rose Island, and in the mid-19th century the Old Colony Steamboat Company took steps to mark the reef. Initially an employee of the company was stationed on the rocks with a horn; later, a lamp on a post was erected.

In 1885 the Lighthouse Service made its first request to replace this lamp with a federal lighthouse, but the replacement was not constructed until 1887. The wooden A-frame house was unlike anything else in the area, and it had neither tower nor lantern room. Instead, a lamp was hung in either gable: red on one end, and white on the other. The unique roof caused some problems with the usual practice of collecting rainwater in cisterns, as it was prone to contamination from salt spray. The first keeper, Frederick Purinton, was badly injured in 1894 by an assailant believed to be a local lobsterman, and quit the post two weeks later.

In 1900 the original lamps were replaced by brighter lanterns, but the same arrangement of hanging them obtained. Then in 1928 a small skeleton tower was erected next to the house, sporting an acetylene lamp. The station survived the devastating hurricane of 1938 and was staffed until 1960, when the light was automated and the house demolished. In 1969 construction of the Newport Bridge, which passes immediately adjacent to the rocks, rendered the light useless, and the tower was likewise removed, leaving the tiny oil house as the sole remaining trace of the station.
