= Ida Lewis Rock Light =

Ida Lewis Light
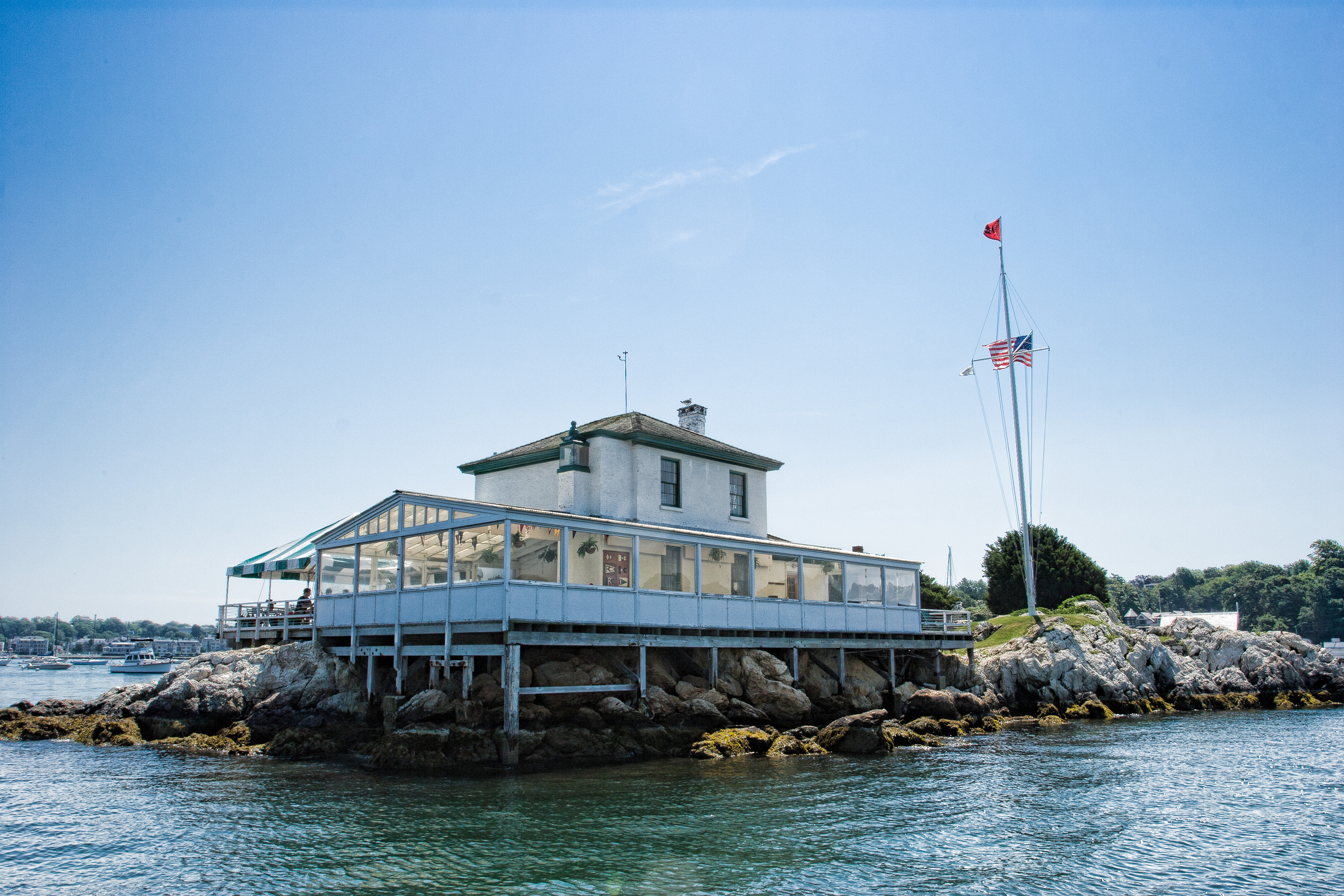
- Location: Newport Harbor, Newport, Rhode Island
- Coordinates: 41°28′40″N 71°19′35″W

Tower
- Constructed: 1854
- Construction: Brick tower attached to lightkeeper's house
- Automated: 1927
- Height: 13 feet (4.0 m)
- Shape: Square
- Markings: White with black lantern
- Heritage: National Register of Historic Places listed place

Light
- First lit: 1854
- Deactivated: 1927 (Original light); 1963 (Automated light)
- Focal height: 30 feet (9.1 m)
- Lens: 6th order Fresnel
- Ida Lewis Rock Lighthouse
- U.S. National Register of Historic Places
- Architectural style: Greek Revival
- MPS: Lighthouses of Rhode Island TR
- NRHP reference No.: 87001700
- Added to NRHP: February 25, 1988

Ida Lewis Lighthouse, which was formerly the Lime Rock Lighthouse, is in the Newport harbor in Rhode Island. It is named after Ida Lewis, who lived and worked at the lighthouse from 1857 and was the official lighthouse keeper from 1879 until her death in 1911. She was celebrated for many acts of bravery in saving lives.

== History ==
In 1853, Congress authorized the construction of a lighthouse on Lime Rock in Newport harbor. Lime Rock is a limestone ledge about 220 yards (200 m) from the shore. The original lighthouse was a short stone tower with a 6th order Fresnel lens and an oil-burning lantern. The light was commissioned in 1854. In the beginning, the lighthouse keeper rowed from the shore daily to tend the light. In case of foul weather, the lighthouse keeper could stay in a small wooden shanty.

The first lighthouse keeper was James Stockbridge Lewis, who had assisted in its construction. After six months, Hosea Lewis, who was the father of James Lewis and a retired pilot, was appointed keeper. In 1857, a two-story house was built for the lighthouse keeper. Lewis and his family moved to the small island in 1857.

A few months after he moved to the island, he suffered a stroke. His wife, Ida Zordia Lewis and her children tended the light. Their eldest daughter, who was also named Ida Lewis, did much of the work. After her mother died, she was officially appointed lighthouse keeper from 1879 to 1911. The island and the lighthouse were named for Ida Lewis in 1924.

The last lighthouse keeper was Evard Jansen. He remained until the light was automated in 1927. The original light was replaced with an automated, acetylene light on a skeleton tower. It was deactivated in 1963.

The original Fresnel lens is on display at the Museum of Newport History. The lighthouse is maintained as the clubhouse of the Ida Lewis Yacht Club. They have a light as a private aid during part of the year.

The Ida Lewis Lighthouse is on the National Register of Historic Places, No. 87001700.

== See also ==
- National Register of Historic Places listings in Newport County, Rhode Island
- Ida Lewis Yacht Club
- Lime Rock Lighthouse Plans 1853 and 1856
