= Taylor Inlet =

Inlet on south coast of Western Australia

- Interactive map of Taylor Inlet
- Coordinates: 34°59′38″S 118°03′33″E
- Country: Australia
- State: Western Australia
- LGA: City of Albany

Taylor Inlet is an inlet located in the Great Southern region of Western Australia. The inlet is located on the coast near Nanarup Beach approximately 23 kilometres (14 mi) east of Albany and is contained within the Taylor Inlet nature reserve.

The inlet is a wave dominated estuary with a degraded catchment that is a result of substantial clearing and a saline run-off. It covers a total area of 1.2 square kilometres (297 acres) and the catchment covers a total area of about 10 square kilometres (4 sq mi).

The inlet is separated from the Southern Ocean by a sand bar and typically open once or twice a year for a few weeks at a time, usually between September and January. It is kidney shaped and lies almost parallel to the shoreline. The channel is approximately 300 metres (984 ft) in length and 100 metres (328 ft) wide.

The vegetation fringing the inlet include Melaleuca cuticularis, Juncus kraussii, Samolus repens, Gahnia trifida and Baumea juncea. Other plants found in the surrounding dunes include sand spinifex, sword sedge and berry saltbush, pigface and peppermint trees.
