= Lighthouse keeper =

Profession in the shipping industry

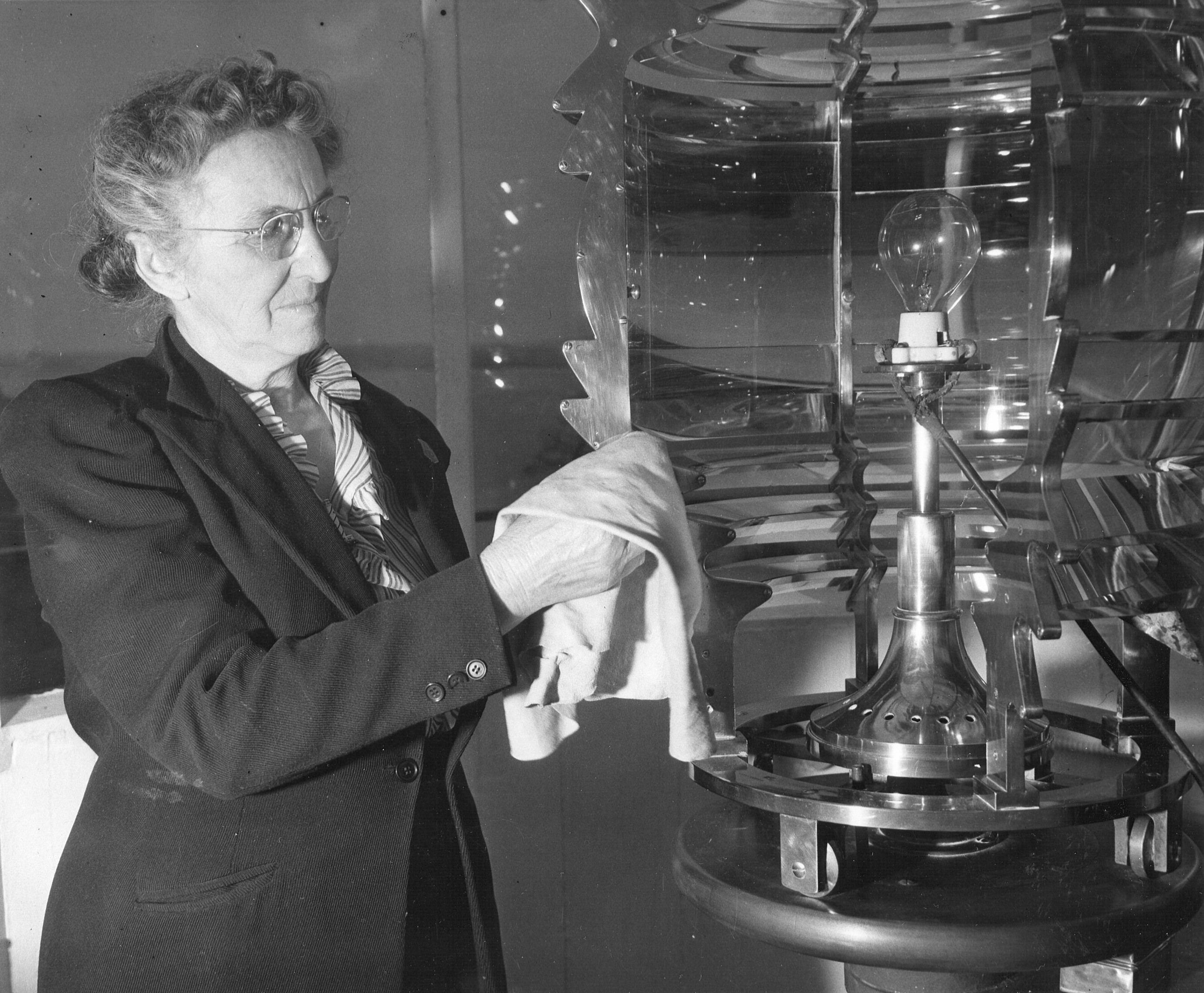
- Fanny May Salter, a lighthouse keeper in the United States Coast Guard service, polishes the lens in the Turkey Point Light, Maryland in 1945.

Occupation
- Synonyms: Lightkeeper
- Occupation type: Profession
- Activity sectors: Marine occupation

A lighthouse keeper or lightkeeper is a person responsible for tending to and caring for a lighthouse, particularly the light and lens in the days when oil lamps and clockwork mechanisms were used. Lighthouse keepers were sometimes referred to as "wickies" because of their job trimming the wicks.

== Duties and functions ==
Historically, lighthouse keepers were needed to trim the wicks, replenish fuel, wind clockworks and perform maintenance tasks such as cleaning lenses and windows. They were also responsible for the fog signal and the weather station, and played a major role in search and rescue at sea.

Because most lighthouses are located in remote, isolated or inaccessible areas on islands and coastlines, it was typical for the work of lighthouse keeper to remain within a family, passing from parents to child, all of whom lived in or near the lighthouse itself. "Stag light" was an unofficial term given to some isolated lighthouses in the United States Lighthouse Service. It meant stations that were operated solely by men, rather than accommodating keepers and their families.

Electrification and other technological advancements such as remote monitoring and automatic bulb changing began to appear in the 1960s, and over the course of the late 20th century made paid resident keepers at the lights unnecessary in certain areas, while simply altering their responsibilities elsewhere. Those who continue to work as lighthouse keepers today perform building maintenance, repair work to broken and blind buoys, geographic realignment of wayward navigational aids off the coast, and technical maintenance on automated systems. In most countries, the training of lighthouse keepers falls within the jurisdiction of the Navy or Coast guard. In the US, periodic maintenance of the lights is now performed by visiting Coast Guard Aids to Navigation teams.

== History ==
George Worthylake served as the first lighthouse keeper in the United States. He served at Boston Harbor Lighthouse from 1716 until his death in 1718. In 1776, Hannah Thomas became the first female lighthouse keeper in the United States when she became keeper of Plymouth (Gurnet) Lighthouse in Massachusetts following the death of her husband, John Thomas. Both Hannah and her husband received $200 per year for their service.

A famous example of a named individual in a formal capacity as a lighthouse keeper was William, a member of the now famous Knott family, who was appointed to the South Foreland lighthouse near Dover, England, in 1730.

== Current status ==
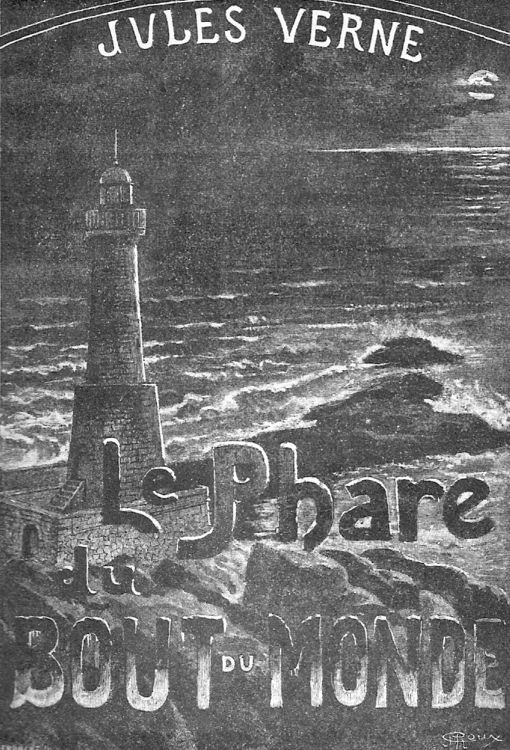
Cover of The Lighthouse at the End of the World by Jules Verne and Michel Verne, one of several fictional depictions (books and films) of the lives of lighthouse keepers.

=== North America ===
According to Fisheries and Oceans Canada, 51 staffed lighthouses remain in Canada, as of October 2017: one in New Brunswick, 23 in Newfoundland and Labrador, and 27 in British Columbia. All of these lighthouses are staffed for operational reasons, except for the light on Machias Seal Island. This lighthouse, manned by the Canadian Coast Guard, is kept occupied for sovereignty purposes due to the disputed status of the island with the US. The Coast Guard further clarified in 2022 that 90 people are employed as lighthouse keepers across the country, all of whom are considered to be employees of the federal government, and 54 of whom operate out of British Columbia.

The last civilian keeper in the United States, Frank Schubert, died in 2003. The last officially manned lighthouse, Boston Light, was manned by the Coast Guard until 1998. It now has volunteer Coast Guard Auxiliary "keepers" whose primary role is to serve as interpretive tour guides for visitors.

The lighthouses of Mexico are managed by the General Directorate for Ports and Merchant Marine, a government agency within the larger Secretariat of Communications and Transportation. Automation is not as common in Mexico as in other countries and many of the larger lights are therefore still staffed by resident civilian keepers.

=== South America ===
The first lighthouse in Brazil is recorded to have been lit in 1698 in Santo Antonio, Bahia province, and the country maintains a rich lighthouse keeping tradition. Of the 200 active lighthouses still maintained by the Navigational Aid Center, 33 are staffed, as of March 2020.

As of 2013, the National Geospatial-Intelligence Agency (NGA) listed 650 lighthouses in Chile and approximately 20 of those were inhabited as of 2003. The southernmost lighthouse in the world, located on the northeast coast of Isla Gonzalo, in the Diego Ramirez Islands, remains a continuously staffed lighthouse and meteorological station administered by the Chilean Navy. In October 2017, the lighthouse keeper Marcelo Escobar had to be airlifted to Punta Arenas after he suffered a broken arm.

=== Europe ===
Sweden began systematically automating its lighthouses as early as the 1930s. This transformation was so efficient that of the over 100 inhabited lighthouses operating at the start of the 20th century, only nine remained by the year 1980, and only three remained staffed into the 21st century: Kullen Lighthouse, the oldest lighthouse in Scandinavia, was automated in 2003, having been only inhabited periodically since 1996, and then with the retirement of Lighthouse Master Per-Erik Broström on February 25, 2003, Holmögadd lighthouse on the southern end of Holmöarna, became Sweden's final inhabited lighthouse. Holmögadd lighthouse was decommissioned five years later.

The last manned lighthouse in Finland was deserted in 1987, and the last Norwegian lighthouse keeper moved out of Runde Lighthouse in 2002. In Estonia, the last staffed lighthouse, Suurupi Upper Lighthouse, became unmanned in 2004 when the lighthouse keeper position was abolished.

Most French lighthouses are automated, though approximately a dozen were still staffed as of 2011. The French Department of Lighthouses and Beacons recommends that at least two isolated lighthouses at sea remain staffed regularly, if not constantly, for the benefit of training personnel in the work of maritime signal maintenance and safety.

As of 2011, there were also 62 staffed lighthouses in Italy and two staffed lights in the Netherlands – one at Schiermonnikoog and the other on the island of Terschelling.

The last lighthouse keeper in Iceland was dismissed in 2010.

==== The United Kingdom and Ireland ====
Automation of lighthouses in Britain and Ireland began in the late 1960s, but the majority of lighthouses remained staffed by resident keepers until the 1980s and 1990s. On the Isle of Man, the final lighthouses to become automated and therefore lose their keepers were the Calf of Man and Langness lighthouses, which were converted in 1995 and 1996 respectively. The Langness Lighthouse was purchased in 2008 by British television personality Jeremy Clarkson, and his ex-wife currently operates the property as tourist accommodations.

The Hook Head Lighthouse, at the eastern entrance to Ireland's Waterford Harbour, is the second oldest operating lighthouse in the world. It was manned continuously from at least 1207 until 1996, when it was finally automated. From the time of its construction in the 13th century, until the mid-17th century, the lighthouse was even home to an early Christian monastery.

Following the automation of Hook Head Lighthouse, Baily Lighthouse became the last Irish lighthouse to have a resident keeper, but it too was automated in 1997, and the lighthouse keeper was no longer needed.

A couple of months later, on March 31, 1998, the keepers left the Fair Isle South Lighthouse in Shetland, and with that the final Scottish lighthouse to be staffed became automated.

The last manned lighthouse in England, and the United Kingdom, was the North Foreland Lighthouse in Kent. The last six keepers Dave Appleby, Colin Bale, Dermot Cronin, Tony Homewood, Barry Simmons and Tristan Sturley completed their service in a ceremony attended by the Prince Philip, on 26 November 1998. In an interview with the BBC, Dermot Cronin remarked, "I had no idea I would be closing the door of the last manned lighthouse in the British Isles."

=== Asia ===
Under pressure from British minister Sir Harry Parkes to fulfil its obligations under the Anglo-Japanese Treaty of Amity and Commerce to make the waters and harbors of Japan safe for shipping, the Tokugawa shogunate hired the Edinburgh-based firm of D. and T. Stevenson to chart coastal waters and to build lighthouses where appropriate. Richard Henry Brunton was sent from Edinburgh in August 1868 to head the project after being recommended to the Japanese government by the Stevensons, Over the next seven and a half years he designed and supervised the building of 26 Japanese lighthouses in the Western style, along with two lightvessels. Brunton also established a system of lighthouse keepers, modeled on the Northern Lighthouse Board in Scotland. Initially under the jurisdiction of the Imperial Japanese Navy, the responsibility for maintaining lighthouses came under the Maritime Safety Agency following World War 2. In 2006 Meshima Lighthouse became the last of Japan's 3,337 lighthouses to become automated.

There are five lighthouses along the coasts of the Malay Peninsula, all managed by the Maritime and Port Authority of Singapore. Of those five, two were still regularly staffed by lighthouse keepers as of the end of 2015. Raffles Lighthouse, on Singapore's southernmost island, and Pulau Pisang Lighthouse, which is technically located within the neighbouring country of Malaysia, are both crewed by a rotating staff of eight lighthouse keepers who work 10-day shifts in pairs.

=== Oceania ===
The last staffed lighthouse in Australia was the Sugarloaf Point Light, otherwise known as Seal Rocks Lighthouse. Although the lighthouse was electrified in 1966, and automated in 1987, a caretaker and lighthouse keeper remained on site until 2007, when the lighthouse keeper's cottages were renovated into tourist accommodations. The Maatsuyker Island Lighthouse off the southern coast of Tasmania, although fully automated in 1996, still employs volunteer caretakers on six-month assignments; the duties include weather observations and land management as well as building maintenance.

All lighthouses in New Zealand have been automated since 1990.

== Recognition ==
=== In literature and the arts ===
The character of the lighthouse keeper has been popular throughout history for their associated air of adventure, mystery, isolation and their rugged lifestyle. The heroic role that lighthouse keepers can sometimes play when shipwrecks occur also feeds into their popularity.

The following books, films, TV shows and songs draw heavily upon the life of the lighthouse keeper:

- The Adventures of Portland Bill (1983 TV Series by FilmFair)
- Ahab's Wife (1999 novel by Sena Jeter Naslund)
- Aquaman (2018 film by James Wan)
- Big Joys, Small Sorrows (1986 film by Keisuke Kinoshita)
- Cape Forlorn (1931 film)/Le cap perdu (1931 film)/Menschen im Käfig (1930 film) – (Multiple-language production by Ewald André Dupont)
- Cold Skin (2017 film)
- Doctor Who – The Horror of Fang Rock (1977)
- "The Eddystone Light" (also "The Keeper of the Eddystone Light"), 19th century song, authorship disputed but possibly by Arthur Lloyd, performed by Burl Ives, the Brothers Four, Peter Paul and Mary, The Weavers, and many others. it's based on "The Man of the Nore" (Roud #22257), which also includes the keeper of the Eddystone Light, and adds his son, the captain of the lightship Nore.
- The Fog (1980 film by John Carpenter)
- In Fraggle Rock, the Outer Space segments were changed to fit international audiences; for the first two seasons of the UK version, the character of Doc was changed to the Captain, a retired sailor living a lighthouse. After actor Fulton MacKay died in 1987, he was succeeded by John Gordon Sinclair as P.K. (the Captain's nephew) in season 3, and in turn by Simon O'Brien as B.J. (the son of the lighthouse's owner) in the fourth and final season.
- The Goodies - "Lighthouse Keeping Loonies" (1975)
- Hello Lighthouse (2018 book)
- Ladies of the Lights (2010 book)
- The Lighthouse-Keeper of Aspenwall (Polish: Latarnik) (1881, one of the most famous novellas by Henryk Sienkiewicz)
- The Lamplighters (2021 book by Emma Stonex)
- The Light at the Edge of the World (film adaptation of the above, 1971)
- The Light Between Oceans (2016 film by Derek Cianfrance based on the 2012 novel of the same name by M. L. Stedman)
- The Light-House (1849 unfinished novel by Edgar Allan Poe)
- The Lighthouse (1980 opera by Sir Peter Maxwell Davies)
- The Lighthouse (2016 film)
- The Lighthouse (2019 film by Robert Eggers)
- The Lighthouse at the End of the World (1905 novel by Jules Verne)
- "The Lighthouse Keeper" (2020 song by Sam Smith)
- The Lighthouse Keepers (Three novels, 2006–2008)
- The Lighthouse Keepers (1929 film)
- The Lightkeepers (2009 film by Daniel Adams)
- The Lighthouse-Keeper's Daughter a.k.a. Manina, the Girl in the Bikini (1952 film)
- Pete's Dragon (1977 film by Don Chaffey)
- "A Plague of Lighthouse Keepers" (1971 song by Van der Graaf Generator)
- Round the Twist (1990-2001 Australian children's comedy drama television series about the supernatural adventures of a family living in a lighthouse in a coastal town)
- Salty's Lighthouse (1997–1998 TV series by Sunbow Entertainment and TLC)
- The Seventh Survivor (1941 film by Leslie S. Hiscott)
- Times of Joy and Sorrow (1957 film by Keisuke Kinoshita)
- The Vanishing (2018 film by Kristoffer Nyholm)
- "The White Ship" (1919 short story by H.P. Lovecraft)

=== In Marine Safety and National Coast Guards ===
To recognize the role of lighthouse keepers in the nation's maritime safety, the US Coast Guard named a class of 175-foot (53 m) USCG Coastal Buoy Tenders after famous US Lighthouse Keepers. Fourteen ships in the "Keeper" class were built between 1996 and 2000 and are used to maintain aids to navigation, including lighthouses:

- USCGC Ida Lewis (WLM-551); Newport, Rhode Island
- USCGC Katherine Walker (WLM-552); Bayonne, New Jersey
- USCGC Abbie Burgess (WLM-553); Rockland, Maine
- USCGC Marcus Hanna (WLM-554); South Portland, Maine
- USCGC James Rankin (WLM-555); Baltimore, Maryland
- USCGC Joshua Appleby (WLM-556); St. Petersburg, Florida
- USCGC Frank Drew (WLM-557); Portsmouth, Virginia
- USCGC Anthony Petit (WLM-558);Ketchikan, Alaska
- USCGC Barbara Mabrity (WLM-559); Mobile, Alabama
- USCGC William Tate (WLM-560); Philadelphia, Pennsylvania
- USCGC Harry Claiborne (WLM-561); Galveston, Texas
- USCGC Maria Bray (WLM-562); Atlantic Beach, Florida
- USCGC Henry Blake (WLM-563); Everett, Washington
- USCGC George Cobb (WLM-564); San Pedro, California

== See also ==
- Grace Darling
- Marcus Hanna
- Ida Lewis
- Property caretaker
- Warden
