= Maria Bray =

American lighthouse keeper and phycologist (1828–1921)

Maria Herrick Bray
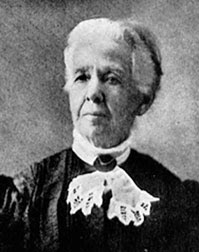
- Born: Maria Haskell Herrick; April 25, 1828; Gloucester, Massachusetts
- Died: June 18, 1921 (aged 93); Gloucester, Massachusetts
- Occupations: lighthouse keeper and phycologist

Maria Haskell Herrick Bray (1828–1921) was a 19th-century American writer, editor, and phycologist, best known for being a maritime heroine of an incident during the first days of winter in late 1864.

Bray was married to Alexander D. Bray (1818–1885), the lighthouse keeper at Thacher Island Light, off Rockport on Massachusetts' Cape Ann. From December 21 to December 24, 1864, she and her twelve-year-old nephew tended the lights of the station during a winter storm, while her husband was stranded on the mainland, where he had taken an ill co-worker. The Bray family was reunited on Christmas Day.

During her lifetime Bray was recognised as an expert in marine algae. In 1876 Bray exhibited her herbarium collection in the Women's Building at the Centennial Exposition. In 1880 she was described in a French publication as a correspondent with expertise in marine algae. Her collecting expertise was acknowledged by John Robinson in his 1880 book The flora of Essex County, Massachusetts and many of her specimens helped inform his research. Her expertise in marine algae was again recognised by Alpheus Baker Hervey in his 1882 book Sea mosses. A collector's guide and an introduction to the study of marine Algae. Bray was a member of the Essex Institute, hosted meetings at her residence and guided members in a botanical field trip. She was acknowledged in an obituary of Frank Shipley Collins' as helping inspire his interest in algae.

In 2000, the United States Coast Guard named a coastal buoy tender, USCGC Maria Bray, in her honor.
