= Tala Birell =

Romanian-Austrian actress (1907–1958)

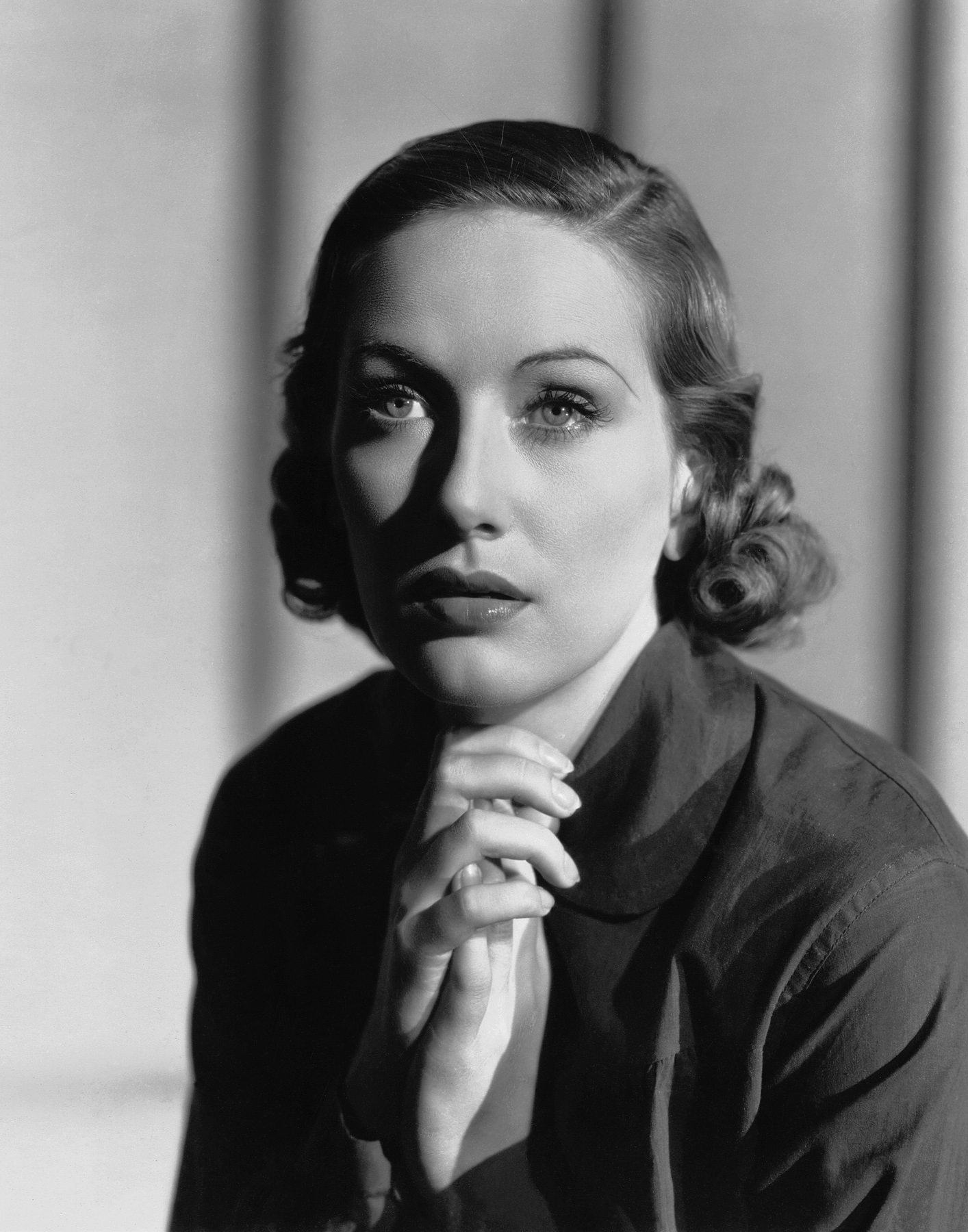
- Tala Birell in She's Dangerous (1937)
- Born: Natalie Bierle; 10 September 1907; Bucharest, Kingdom of Romania
- Died: 17 February 1958 (aged 50); Landstuhl, Rhineland-Palatinate, West Germany
- Resting place: Cemetery of Marquartstein
- Citizenship: Romania; Austria
- Occupation: Film actress
- Years active: 1926–1955

Tala Birell (born Natalie Bierle; 10 September 1907 – 17 February 1958) was a Romanian-born (Note: The reference book Dictionary of Pseudonyms: 13,000 Assumed Names and Their Origins identifies Birell as a Polish-Austrian actress.) (Note: A feature about Birell that was published in the Oakland Tribune on April 14, 1935, quotes her as saying "I am Viennese—with a dash of Polish.") stage and film actress.

== Early years ==
Birell was born in Bucharest as Natalie Bierle on 10 September 1907, the daughter of Bavarian businessman Karl Bierle and Stefanie von Schaydakowska, who came from Austro-Hungarian Galicia.

== Career ==
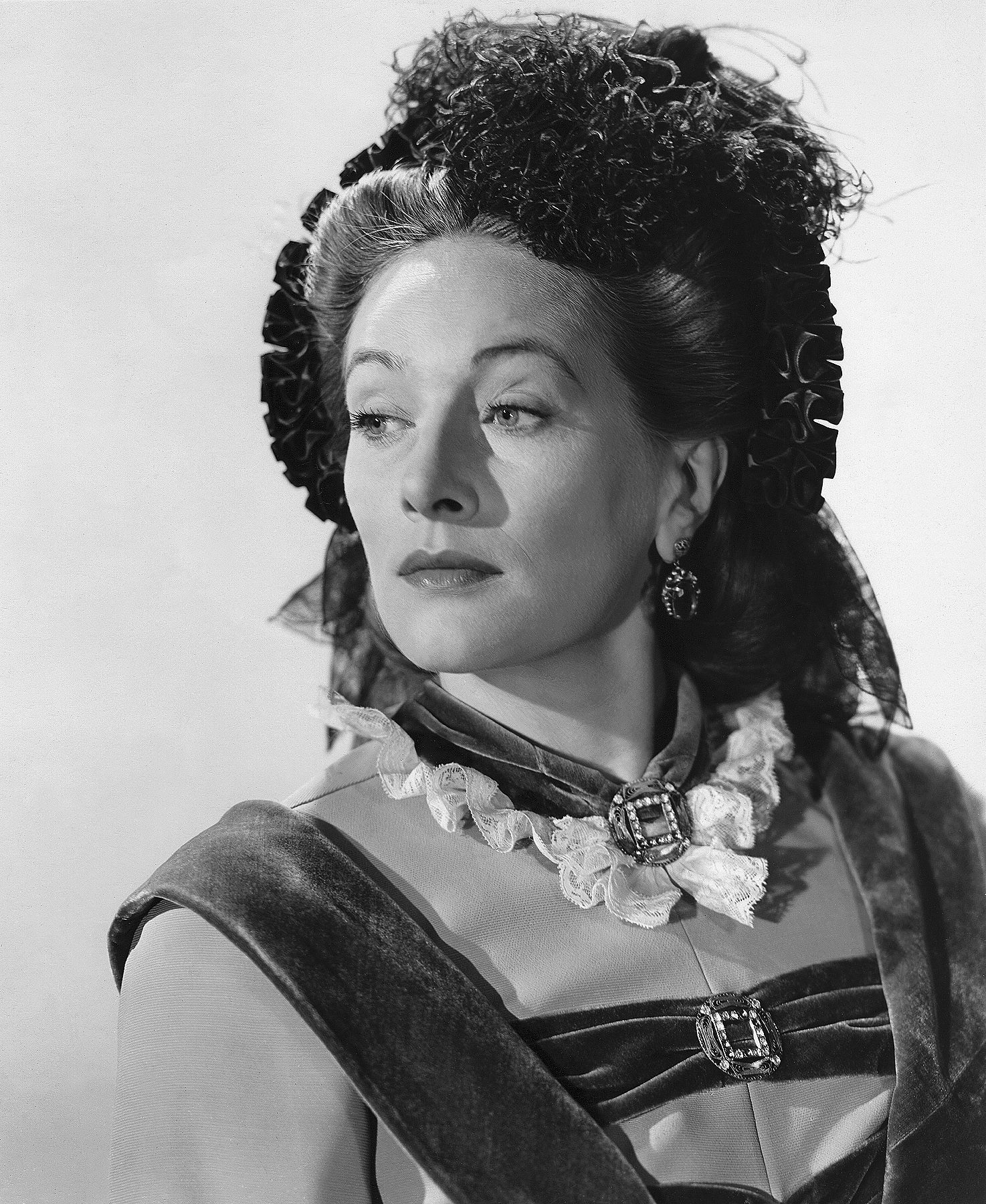
Tala Birell in The Song of Bernadette (1943)

Birell had stage and screen experience in Vienna. She doubled for Marlene Dietrich in German films.

The Oakland Tribune reported that Birell "made her debut in a hit in a Berlin production of Madame Pompadour." She came to England in 1930 to appear in E. A. Dupont's Menschen im Käfig, the German language version of Cape Forlorn, and later went to America to play in the German version of The Boudoir Diplomat. Star of the stage in Europe, she became popular in American films, including a small role in Bringing Up Baby (1938).

In 1940 she appeared onstage in My Dear Children at the Belasco Theatre in New York City. She also appeared on Broadway in Order Please (1934). One of her final on-camera appearances was on the popular 1953 US anthology drama television series Orient Express in the episode titled The Red Sash.

== Personal life and death ==
Birell became an American citizein in Chicago on April 1, 1940.

Birell died, aged 50, on 17 February 1958, in Landstuhl, German Federal Republic. She is buried in the Bavarian village Marquartstein in a family tomb.

== Filmography ==
- Man spielt nicht mit der Liebe (1926) .... Bit Role (as Thala Birell)
- Ich habe im Mai von der Liebe geträumt (1927)
- The Deed of Andreas Harmer (1930) .... Othmars Valentin's Gattin
- Menschen im Käfig (1930) .... Eileen Kell
- Liebe auf Befehl (1931) .... Marie-Anne
- My Cousin from Warsaw (1931) .... Lucienne
- Doomed Battalion (1932) .... Maria Di Mai
- Nagana (1933) .... Countess Sandra Lubeska
- Let's Fall in Love (1933) .... Rose Forsell
- The Captain Hates the Sea (1934) .... Gerta Klargi
- Let's Live Tonight (1935) .... Countess Margot de Legere
- Air Hawks (1935) .... Renee Dupont
- Spring Tonic (1935) .... Lola
- Crime and Punishment (1935) .... Antonya Raskolnikov
- The Lone Wolf Returns (1935) .... Liane Mallison
- White Legion (1936) .... Dr. Sterne
- She's Dangerous (1937) .... Stephanie Duval
- As Good as Married (1937) .... Princess Cherry Bouladoff
- Bringing Up Baby (1938) .... Mrs. Lehman
- Invisible Enemy (1938) .... Sandra Kamarov
- Josette (1938) .... Mlle. Josette
- Seven Miles from Alcatraz (1942) .... Baroness
- One Dangerous Night (1943) .... Sonia Budenny
- China (1943) .... Blonde
- Isle of Forgotten Sins (1943) .... Christine
- Women in Bondage (1943) .... Ruth Bracken
- The Song of Bernadette (1943) .... Madame Leontine Bruat (uncredited)
- The Purple Heart (1944) .... Johanna Hartwig
- The Monster Maker (1944) .... Maxine
- Make Your Own Bed (1944) .... Miss Marie Gruber
- Till We Meet Again (1944) .... Mme. Bouchard (uncredited)
- Mrs. Parkington (1944) .... Lady Nora Ebbsworth
- Jungle Queen (1945, Serial) .... Dr. Elise Bork
- The Power of the Whistler (1945) .... Constantina Ivaneska
- The Frozen Ghost (1945) .... Valerie Monet
- Girls of the Big House (1945) .... Alma, confined murderess
- Dangerous Millions (1946) .... Sonia Bardos
- Philo Vance's Gamble (1947) .... Tina Cromwell
- Philo Vance's Secret Mission (1947) .... Mrs. Elizabeth Phillips
- Song of Love (1947) .... Princess Valerie Hohenfels
- Women in the Night (1948) .... Yvette Aubert
- Homicide for Three (1948) .... Rita Brown
- Flash Gordon (1955, TV series) .... Queen of Cygini (final appearance)
