= USCGC Maria Bray =

Keeper-class coastal buoy tender of the United States Coast Guard

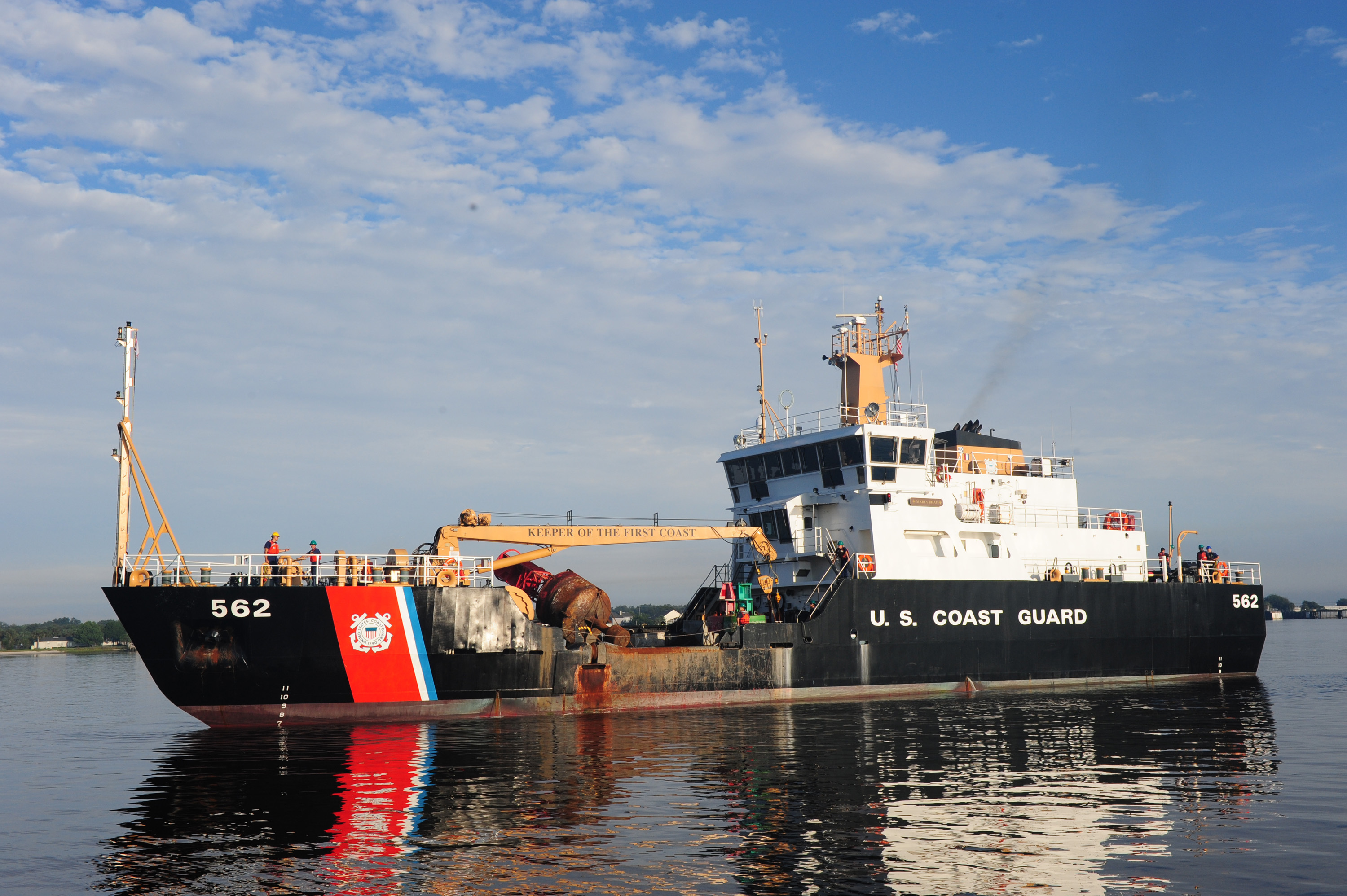
- USCGC Maria Bray

History

United States
- Name: Maria Bray
- Operator: US Coast Guard
- Builder: Marinette Marine Corporation
- Launched: 28 August 1999
- Commissioned: 26 July 2000
- Home port: Atlantic Beach, Florida
- Identification: IMO number: 9177301; Call sign: NTUU; MMSI number: 338923000
- Status: Active

General characteristics
- Type: Keeper-class buoy tender
- Displacement: 850 long tons (864 t) full load
- Length: 175 ft (53.3 m)
- Beam: 36 ft (11.0 m)
- Draft: 8 ft (2.4 m)
- Installed power: 2,000 hp (1,500 kW) sustained
- Propulsion: 2 × Caterpillar 3508 DITA Diesel engines; bow thruster, 500 hp (373 kW)
- Speed: 12 knots (22 km/h; 14 mph)
- Range: 2000 nautical miles at 10 kn
- Crew: 23 (1 Officer, 22 Enlisted)

USCGC Maria Bray (WLM-562) is a Keeper-class coastal buoy tender of the United States Coast Guard. Launched in 1999, she is home-ported in Atlantic Beach, Florida. Her primary mission is maintaining over 300 aids to navigation from Georgetown, South Carolina to Fort Pierce, Florida. Secondary missions include marine environmental protection, search and rescue, and security. She is assigned to Sector Jacksonville of the Seventh Coast Guard District.

== Construction and characteristics ==
On 22 June 1993 the Coast Guard awarded the contract for the Keeper-class vessels to Marinette Marine Corporation in the form of a firm contract for the lead ship and options for thirteen more. The Coast Guard exercised options for the final four ships, including Maria Bray, in September 1997. The ship was launched on 28 August 1999 into the Menominee River. She was christened by Susan Green, wife of U.S. Representative Mark Green, who also attended the launch. Maria Bray is the twelfth of the fourteen Keeper-class ships built.

Her hull was built of welded steel plates. She is 175 feet (53 m) long, with a beam of 36 feet (11 m), and a full-load draft of 8 feet (2.4 m). Maria Bray displaces 850 long tons fully loaded. Her gross register tonnage is 904, and her net register tonnage is 271. The top of the mast is 58.75 feet (17.91 m) above the waterline.

Rather than building the ship from the keel up as a single unit, Marinette Marine used a modular fabrication approach. Eight large modules, or "hull blocks" were built separately and then welded together.

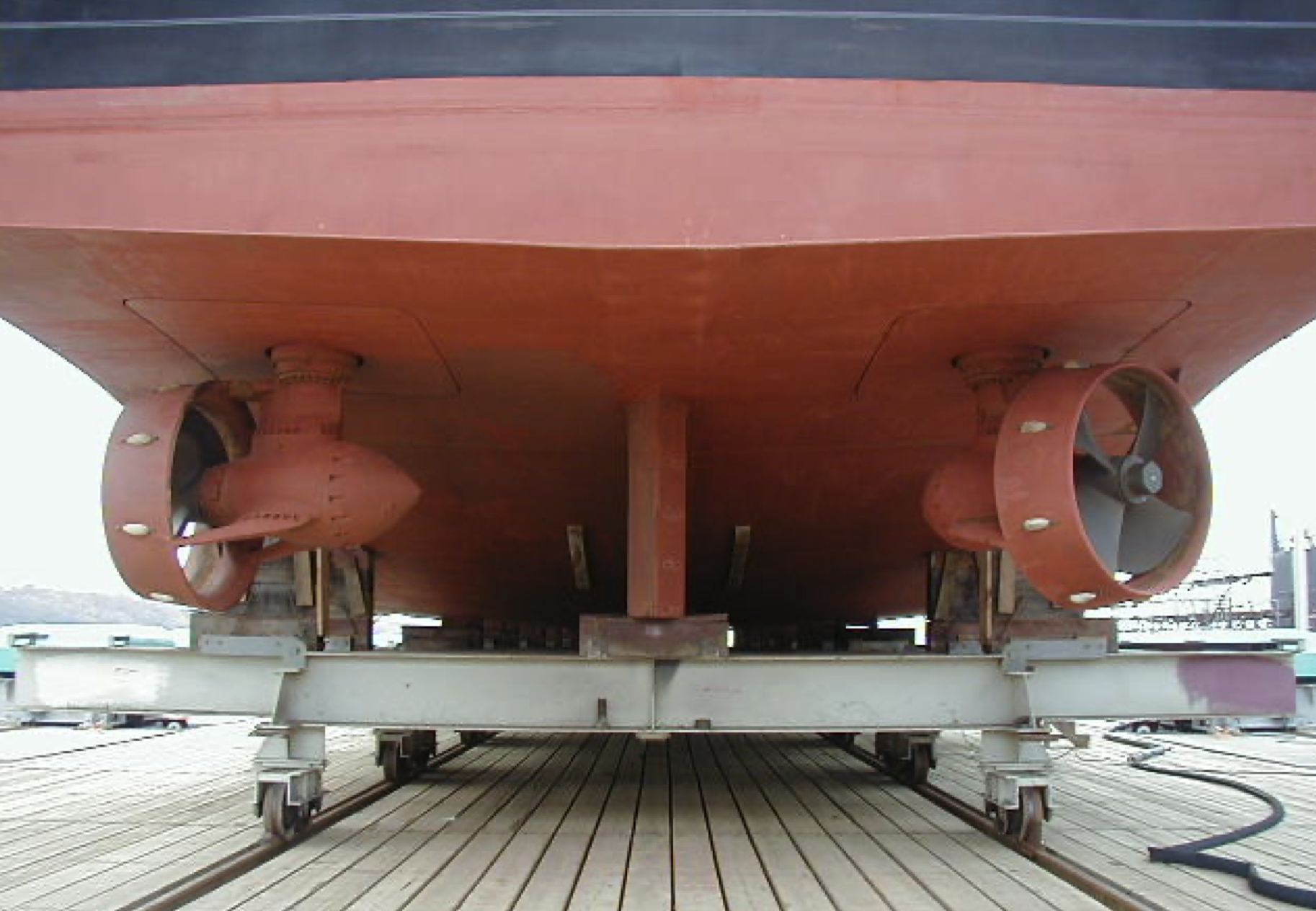
Z-drives on a Keeper-class ship

The ship has two Caterpillar 3508 DITA (direct-injection, turbocharged, aftercooled) 8-cylinder Diesel engines which produce 1000 horsepower each. These drive two Ulstein Z-drives. Keeper-class ships were the first Coast Guard cutters equipped with Z-drives, which markedly improved their maneuverability. The Z-drives have four-bladed propellers which are 57.1 inches (145 cm) in diameter and are equipped with Kort nozzles. They can be operated in "tiller mode" where the Z-drives turn in the same direction to steer the ship, or in "Z-conn mode" where the two Z-drives can turn in different directions to achieve specific maneuvering objectives. An implication of the Z-drives is that there is no reverse gear or rudder aboard Maria Bray. In order to back the ship, the Z-drives are turned 180 degrees which drives the ship stern-first even though the propellers are spinning in the same direction as they do when the ship is moving forward. Her maximum speed is 12 knots. Her tanks can hold 16,385 gallons of diesel fuel which gives her an unrefueled range of 2,000 nautical miles at 10 knots.

She has a 500-horsepower bow thruster. The Z-drives and bow thruster can be linked in a Dynamic Positioning System. This gives Maria Bray the ability to hold position in the water even in heavy currents, winds, and swells. This advanced capability is useful in bringing buoys aboard that can weigh more than 16,000 lbs.

Electrical power aboard is provided by three Caterpillar 3406 DITA generators which produce 285 Kw each. She also has a 210 Kw emergency generator, which is a Caterpillar 3406 DIT.

The buoy deck has 1,335 square feet (124.0 m^{2}) of working area. A crane with a boom 42 feet (13 m) long lifts buoys and their mooring anchors onto the deck. The crane can lift up to 20,000 pounds (9,100 kg).

The ships' fresh water tanks can hold 7,339 gallons. She has three ballast tanks that can be filled to maintain their trim, and tanks for oily waste water, sewage, gray water, new lubrication oil, and waste oil.

Accommodations were designed for mixed gender crews from the start. Crew size and composition has varied over the years. When she was launched, her complement was 18, commanded by a chief warrant officer. She currently has a crew of 24.

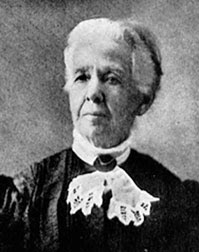
Lighthouse keeper Maria Bray

Maria Bray, as all Keeper-class ships, has a strengthened "ice belt" along the waterline so that she can work on aids to navigation in ice-infested waters. Not only is the hull plating in the ice belt thicker than the rest of the hull, but framing members are closer together in areas that experience greater loads when working in ice. Higher grades of steel were used for hull plating in the ice belt to prevent cracking in cold temperatures. Her bow is sloped so that rather than smashing into ice, she rides up over it to break it with the weight of the ship. Maria Bray is capable of breaking flat, 9-inch thick ice at 3 knots.

The ship carries a cutter boat on davits. She was originally equipped with a CB-M boat which was replaced in the mid-2010s with a CB-ATON-M boat. This was built by Metal Shark Aluminum Boats and was estimated to cost $210,000. The boat is 18 feet (5.5 m) long and are equipped with a Mercury Marine inboard/outboard diesel engine.

Maria Bray replaced USCGC Laurel, which was decommissioned in December 1999.

The ship's namesake is Maria Bray. Her husband, Alexander Bray, was the principal keeper of the two Thatcher Island lighthouses at Cape Ann, Massachusetts. On 21 December 1864 one of the two assistant keepers fell ill with a fever. Mr. Bray and the other assistant loaded their ailing colleague into a boat and sailed to the mainland for a doctor, expecting that they would make a quick return. Instead, gale winds accompanied by blowing snow made it impossible for the keepers to return. Maria, assisted by her nephew, was able to keep both lights burning through the next three days, carrying gallons of lantern fuel through the winds and snow drifts and up the 150 steps in each tower. Keeper Bray finally made it home on Christmas Eve to relieve his wife.

== Operational history ==
The Coast Guard took ownership of Maria Bray on 6 April 2000, and placed her "in commission, special" status. To reach her new home port she sailed from Lake Michigan through the Great Lakes, and out into the Atlantic. She paused off the Thatcher Island lights, once maintained by her namesake, for a wreath-laying ceremony with members of the Thatcher Island Association which operates them today. The ship was placed in full commission at a ceremony at Coast Guard Station Mayport on 26 July 2000.

Maria Bray's buoy tending involves lifting them onto her deck where marine growth is scraped and pressure washed off, inspecting the buoy itself, and replacing lights, solar cells, and radar transponders. The mooring chain or synthetic cable is inspected and replaced as needed. The concrete block mooring anchor is also inspected.

In August 2017 Maria Bray deployed to the Gulf of Mexico to assist in the recovery from Hurricane Harvey. The ship helped repair damaged buoys and to relocate those that had been moved from their charted positions by large waves so that maritime commerce could safely recommence.

The bulk of Maria Bray's year is spent at sea tending its buoys, or in port maintaining the ship. She has been asked to perform other missions, as described below.

=== Search and rescue ===
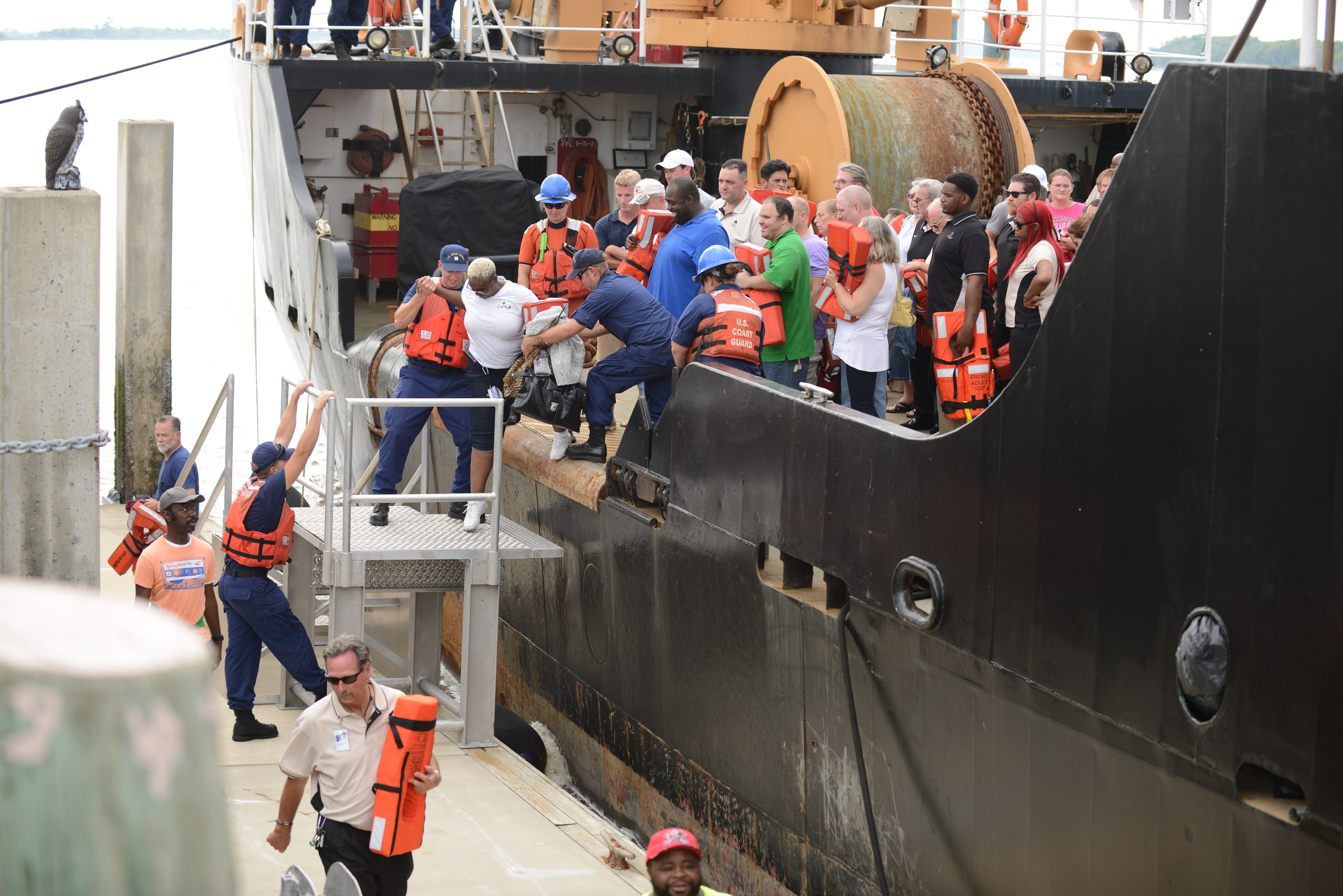
Maria Bray lands passengers rescued from Escapade in July 2014

USCGC Eagle lost its 3,800 pounds (1,700 kg) anchor in the St. Johns River as it departed the "Sail Jacksonville" festival in June 2004. The anchor was located by divers and Maria Bray was dispatched to retrieve it from the bottom of the river in October 2004.

On 16 July 2014 the casino ship Escapade went aground off Tybee Island near Savannah, Georgia with 123 people aboard. Maria Bray was dispatched to the scene and took aboard dozens of passengers and crew to return them to shore.

Maria Bray and other Coast Guard units searched for a paddleboarder lost off the coast of St Lucie County, Florida in July 2015. At roughly the same time, the ship also searched for two teenaged boys whose capsized fishing boat was found offshore in the same area. Both searches were unsuccessful.

=== Environmental Protection ===
In March 2008, Maria Bray exercised with the Vessel of Opportunity Skimming System used for oil spill recovery.

In July 2018, the ship placed concrete reef balls on the sea floor off the northeast coast of Florida to create reef habitat for sea life.

=== Security ===
In September 2012 Maria Bray was diverted from her buoy tending work to assist other Coast Guard units in Alien Migrant Interdiction Operations. A total of 75 migrants were taken aboard the ship for eventual repatriation to Cuba.

The Coast Guard provides maritime security for launches from the Kennedy Space Center at Cape Canaveral, Florida. Maria Bray has been dispatched on this mission.

=== Public engagement ===
The Coast Guard has offered tours aboard Maria Bray on several occasions. These include:

- At Green Bay, Wisconsin shortly after launch in April 2000
- Fleet Week at Port Everglades in 2000
