= NNIC =

NNIC may refer to:

- NCBA Group, a Kenyan financial services conglomerate traded as NNIC
- New Naia Infra Corporation, a Philippine airport operator
- Nimbin Neighbourhood and Information Centre, an Australian tour guide organization
- USCGC Harry Claiborne, a United States Coast Guard ship identified with the call sign NNIC
