= She's Dangerous =

1937 film

- Theatrical release poster
- Directed by: Milton Carruth; Lewis R. Foster
- Screenplay by: Lionel Houser; Albert R. Perkins
- Story by: Murray Roth; Ben Ryan
- Produced by: E. M. Asher
- Starring: Tala Birell; Walter Pidgeon; Cesar Romero; Walter Brennan
- Cinematography: Milton Krasner
- Edited by: Frank Gross
- Production company: Universal Pictures
- Distributed by: Universal Pictures
- Release date: January 24, 1937
- Running time: 68 minutes
- Country: United States
- Language: English

She's Dangerous is a 1937 American crime film directed by Milton Carruth and Lewis R. Foster and written by Lionel Houser and Albert R. Perkins. The film stars Tala Birell, Walter Pidgeon, Cesar Romero, Walter Brennan, Warren Hymer, and Samuel S. Hinds. The film was released on January 24, 1937, by Universal Pictures.

== Plot ==
An ambulance is summoned to a bank when a customer has an apparent heart attack. As the ambulance speeds away the "patient" is sitting up and talking to his partners in their heist of bonds that had just been delivered to the bank. The gang's boss, Nick Sheldon (Cesar Romero), orders everyone to split up and regroup later. Nick resumes his cover identity as a rich gentleman at a high society nightclub. He spots and woos a reluctant beauty, Stephanie Duval (Tala Birell). After taking her to his apartment Nick discovers that Stephanie had stolen a piece of jewelry from a woman at the nightclub. When the gang gets back together Nick announces that he has recruited Stephanie to join the gang despite their unanimous opposition.

Nick sends part of the gang with the stolen bonds to Denver where he will join them to find a buyer for the bonds. Nick becomes suspicious of Stephanie and follows her to a meeting with a private investigator who hired her to infiltrate Nick's gang. After Stephanie departs to meet Nick at the airport Nick kills the investigator, leaving Stephanie's ID photo lying on the floor.

After Nick's private plane is in the air he confronts Stephanie who threatens to expose him to the authorities at the first opportunity. When Nick's driver/pilot, Herman (Warren Hymer) stops to refuel he gives Nick a newspaper with Stephanie's front page photo and headline that she is suspected of the investigator's murder. Nick uses this to pressure Stephanie into silence. Mechanical failure forces Herman to crash land the plane. All three regain consciousness in a remote cabin under the care of vacationing Dr. Scott Logan (Walter Pidgeon) and cook/caretaker Ote O'Leary (Walter Brennan). While Nick and Herman are recovering from their injuries Dr. Logan becomes enamored of Stephanie. When Nick discovers that Stephanie has told Dr. Logan everything, he threatens to kill Dr. Logan unless she goes on the run with him. Nick's plans are thwarted when Ote returns from an errand in town with the sheriff and two deputies.

Both Nick and Stephanie are found guilty of murder and sentenced to the electric chair. Despite her attorney's best efforts all their appeals are denied and double executions are scheduled on the same night. Dr. Logan makes a final appeal to Nick to confess and clear Stephanie. Nick refers to the "ladies first" practice of scheduling Stephanie's execution first and his wish to see her out of Dr. Logan's reach forever. Dr. Logan and the attorney appeal to the warden to do something. The only clue is the warden says he's never done anything like this before. Stephanie is taken to the electric chair first while Nick grimaces in his cell when the execution appears to have taken place. When Nick is taken for his execution he loudly exclaims that they have committed murder by executing an innocent woman and admits he committed the murder. The warden's mystery decision to reverse the order of the executions is revealed when Stephanie enters the room. Nick alleges that he was framed and tries to recant his confession. Stephanie's execution is stayed.

== Cast ==
- Tala Birell as Stephanie Duval
- Walter Pidgeon as Dr. Scott Logan
- Cesar Romero as Nick Sheldon / Al Shaw
- Walter Brennan as Ote O'Leary
- Warren Hymer as Herman Valentz
- Samuel S. Hinds as Warden
- Jonathan Hale as Charles Fitzgerald
- Richard Carle as Kegley
- Franklin Pangborn as Renaud
- Richard Tucker as District Attorney
- June Brewster as Betty Mason
- Stanley Andrews as Franklin Webb
- Claire Rochelle as Jane Hope
- Pierre Watkin as H.J. Conrad
