= The Lighthouse-Keeper of Aspenwall =

Novella by Henryk Sienkiewicz

The Lighthouse-Keeper of Aspenwall (Polish: Latarnik) is a novella by Henryk Sienkiewicz published for the first time in 1881 in the journal Niwa, and included in a 1882 collection of Sienkiewicz's works by Gebethner i Wolff. The story, set in the 1870s, revolves around Skawiński, a Polish migrant who works as a solitary lighthouse keeper in a lighthouse on Aspinwall Island in Colón, Panama.

Sienkiewicz travelled in the United States from 1876 to 1877. "Gazeta Polska" published his travel reports, as well as contributions from fellow journalist and writer Julian Horain, which included an account of a Polish man who was fired from his job as a lighthouse keeper for reading the Zbigniew Kaczkowski novel Murdelio, a distraction that almost resulted in a disaster at sea. Sienkiewicz was inspired to write a novella based on the Horain report. In the novella, Skawiński is distracted by reading Pan Tadeusz by Adam Mickiewicz.

This work is considered one of the best Polish novellas. An autograph resides at Ossolineum.

A 1976 film adaptation was directed by Zbigniew Skonieczny for Telewizja Polska.
