= Harry C. Claiborne =

American lighthouse keeper (1859–1918)

Harry C. Claiborne (January 1859 - 1918) was an American lighthouse keeper.

== Biography ==
He was born in January 1859 in New Orleans. He began his career as assistant keeper of the Southwest Pass Light in Louisiana in 1887. In 1889 he was made head keeper of the Pass a l'Outre Light. In 1895 he was transferred to the Bolivar Point Light near Galveston, Texas. He was on duty when the Galveston Hurricane hit the station on September 8, 1900. 125 people eventually took refuge inside the light tower, including Claiborne's family and that of the assistant keeper; Claiborne oversaw their care until further help was forthcoming. In 1915, he again cared for 50 hurricane refugees who took shelter in the tower.

Claiborne died on duty at the Bolivar Point station in 1918.

== Legacy ==
A United States Coast Guard coastal buoy tender, USCGC Harry Claiborne, WLM-561, based in Galveston, Texas, is named after him.
