= USCGC Frank Drew =

Keeper-class coastal buoy tender of the United States Coast Guard

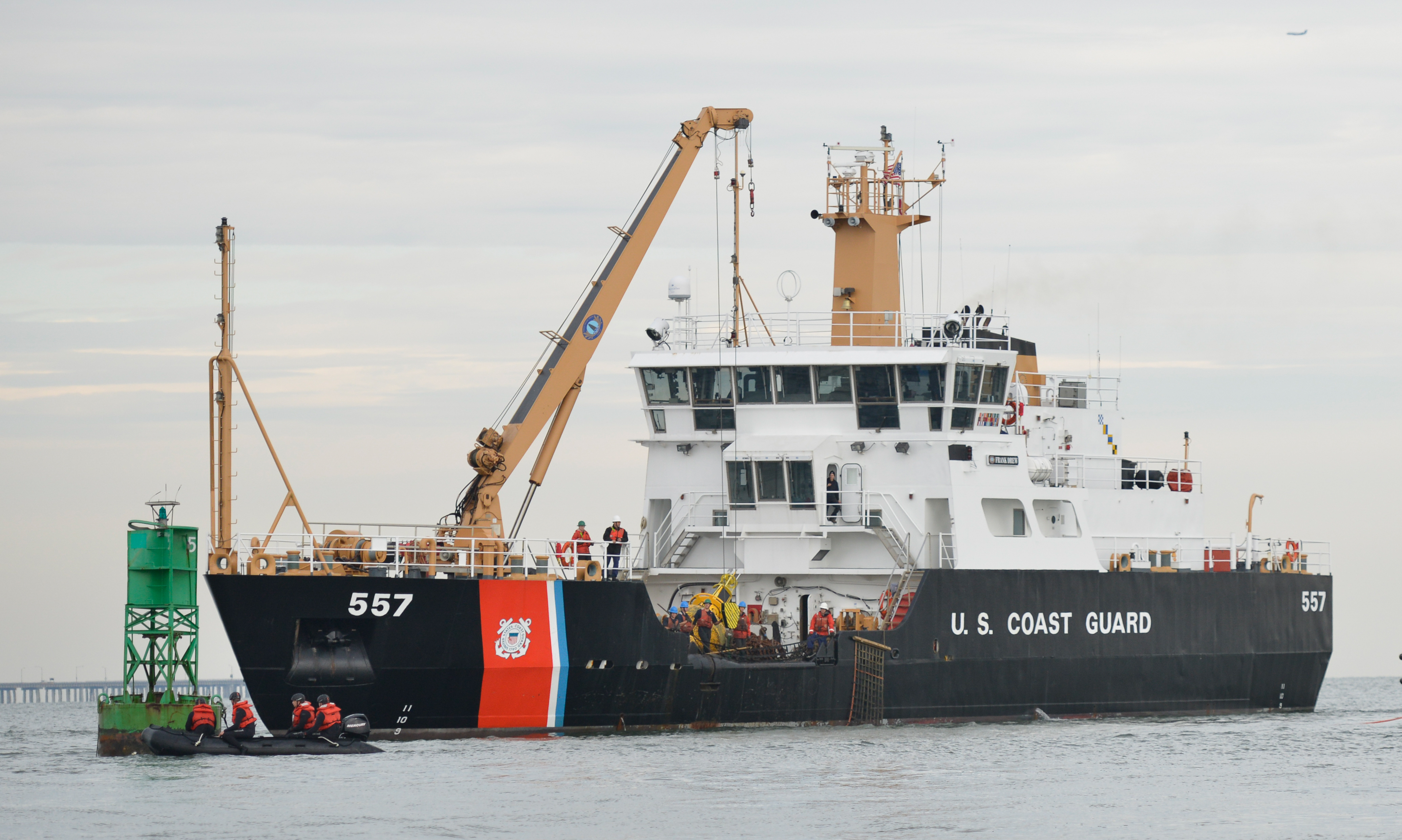
- USCGC Frank Drew

History

United States
- Name: Frank Drew
- Operator: US Coast Guard
- Builder: Marinette Marine Corporation
- Launched: 5 December 1998
- Commissioned: 5 April 2000
- Home port: Portsmouth, Virginia
- Identification: IMO number: 9177258; Call sign: NKDL; MMSI number: 368731000
- Status: Active

General characteristics
- Type: Keeper-class buoy tender
- Displacement: 850 long tons (864 t) full load
- Length: 175 ft (53.3 m)
- Beam: 36 ft (11.0 m)
- Draft: 8 ft (2.4 m)
- Installed power: 2,000 hp (1,500 kW) sustained
- Propulsion: 2 × Caterpillar 3508 DITA Diesel engines; bow thruster, 500 hp (373 kW)
- Speed: 12 knots (22 km/h; 14 mph)
- Range: 2000 nautical miles at 10 kn
- Crew: 24 (2 Officers, 22 Enlisted)

USCGC Frank Drew (WLM-557) is a Keeper-class coastal buoy tender of the United States Coast Guard. Launched in 1998, she is home-ported in Portsmouth, Virginia. Her primary mission is maintaining over 300 aids to navigation in lower Chesapeake Bay, the rivers that flow into it, and a portion of the North Carolina Coast. Secondary missions include marine environmental protection, light icebreaking, search and rescue, and security. She is assigned to the Fifth Coast Guard District.

== Construction and characteristics ==
On 22 June 1993 the Coast Guard awarded the contract for the Keeper-class vessels to Marinette Marine Corporation in the form of a firm order for the lead ship and options for thirteen more. The Coast Guard exercised options for the 5th through 10th ships of the class, including Frank Drew, in February 1997. The ship was launched on 5 December 1998 into the Menominee River. Several of the grandchildren of the ship's namesake, Frank Drew, attended the event. Frank Drew is the seventh of the fourteen Keeper-class ships built.

Her hull was built of welded steel plates. She is 175 feet (53 m) long, with a beam of 36 feet (11 m), and a full-load draft of 8 feet (2.4 m). Frank Drew displaces 850 long tons fully loaded. Her gross register tonnage is 904, and her net register tonnage is 271. The top of the mast is 58.75 feet (17.91 m) above the waterline.

Rather than building the ship from the keel up as a single unit, Marinette Marine used a modular fabrication approach. Eight large modules, or "hull blocks" were built separately and then welded together.

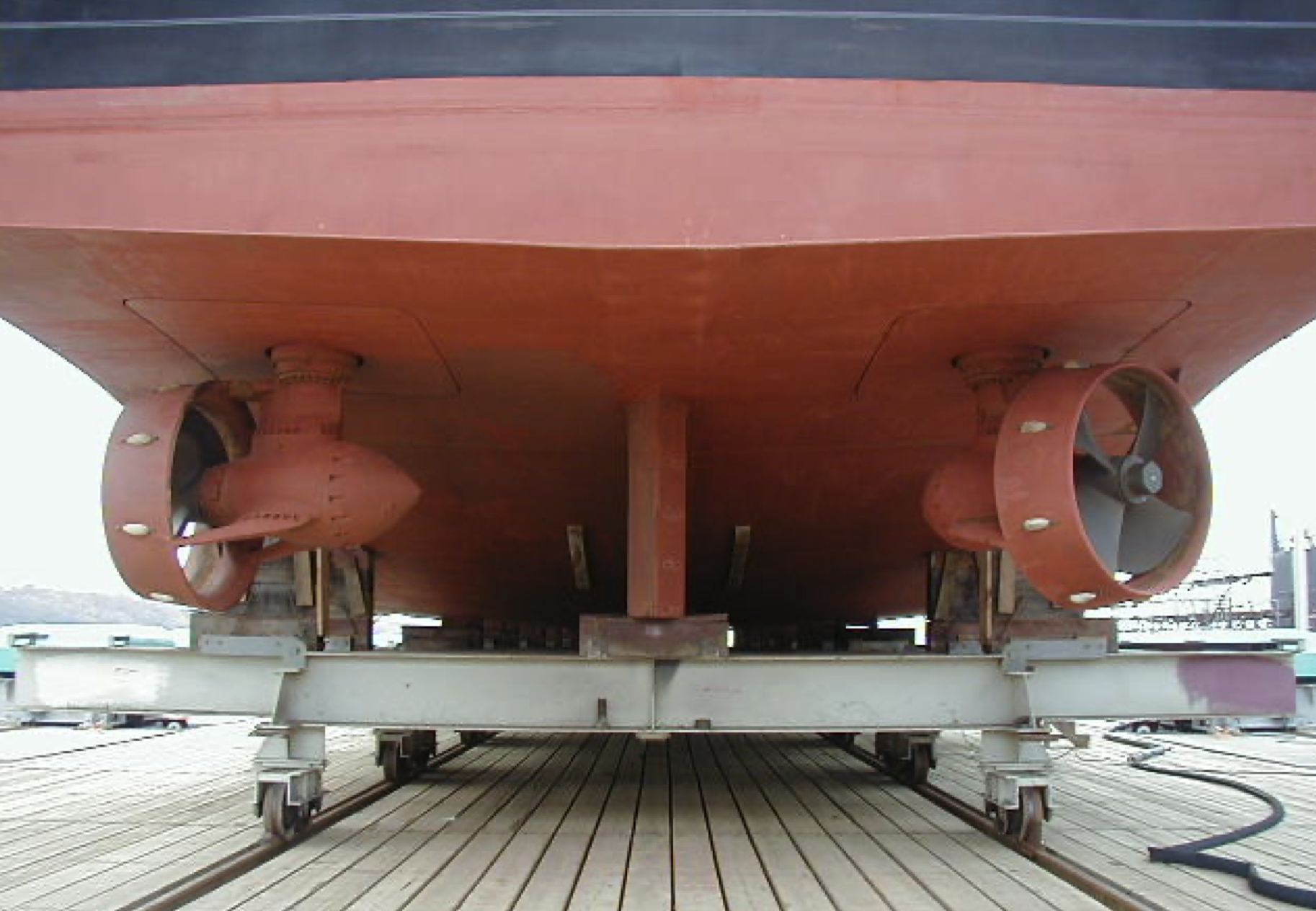
Z-drives on a Keeper-class ship

The ship has two Caterpillar 3508 DITA (direct-injection, turbocharged, aftercooled) 8-cylinder Diesel engines which produce 1000 horsepower each. These drive two Ulstein Z-drives. Keeper-class ships were the first Coast Guard cutters equipped with Z-drives, which markedly improved their maneuverability. The Z-drives have four-bladed propellers which are 57.1 inches (145 cm) in diameter and are equipped with Kort nozzles. They can be operated in "tiller mode" where the Z-drives turn in the same direction to steer the ship, or in "Z-conn mode" where the two Z-drives can turn in different directions to achieve specific maneuvering objectives. An implication of the Z-drives is that there is no reverse gear or rudder aboard Frank Drew. In order to back the ship, the Z-drives are turned 180 degrees which drives the ship stern-first even though the propellers are spinning in the same direction as they do when the ship is moving forward. Her maximum speed is 12 knots. Her tanks can hold 16,385 gallons of diesel fuel which gives her an unrefueled range of 2,000 nautical miles at 10 knots.

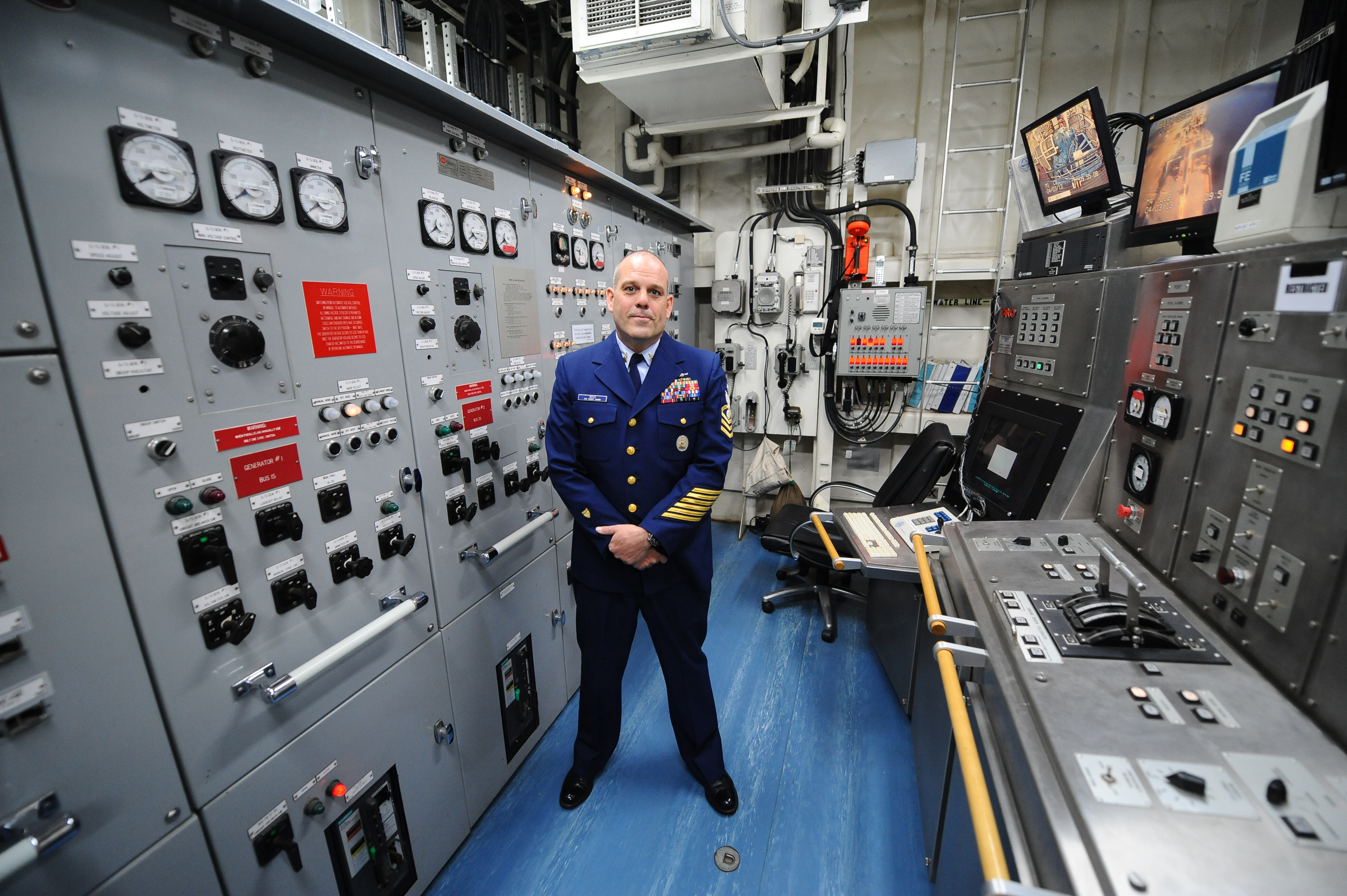
The engineering control center aboard Frank Drew

She has a 500-horsepower bow thruster. The Z-drives and bow thruster can be linked in a Dynamic Positioning System. This gives Frank Drew the ability to hold position in the water even in heavy currents, winds, and swells. This advanced capability is useful in bringing buoys aboard that can weigh more than 16,000 lbs.

Electrical power aboard is provided by three Caterpillar 3406 DITA generators which produce 285 Kw each. She also has a 210 Kw emergency generator, which is a Caterpillar 3406 DIT.

The buoy deck has 1,335 square feet (124.0 m^{2}) of working area. A crane with a boom 42 feet (13 m) long lifts buoys and their mooring anchors onto the deck. The crane can lift up to 20,000 pounds (9,100 kg).

The ships' fresh water tanks can hold 7,339 gallons. She has three ballast tanks that can be filled to maintain their trim, and tanks for oily waste water, sewage, gray water, new lubrication oil, and waste oil.

Accommodations were designed for mixed gender crews from the start. Crew size and composition has varied over the years. When she was commissioned, Frank Drew had a complement of 18, commanded by a chief warrant officer.

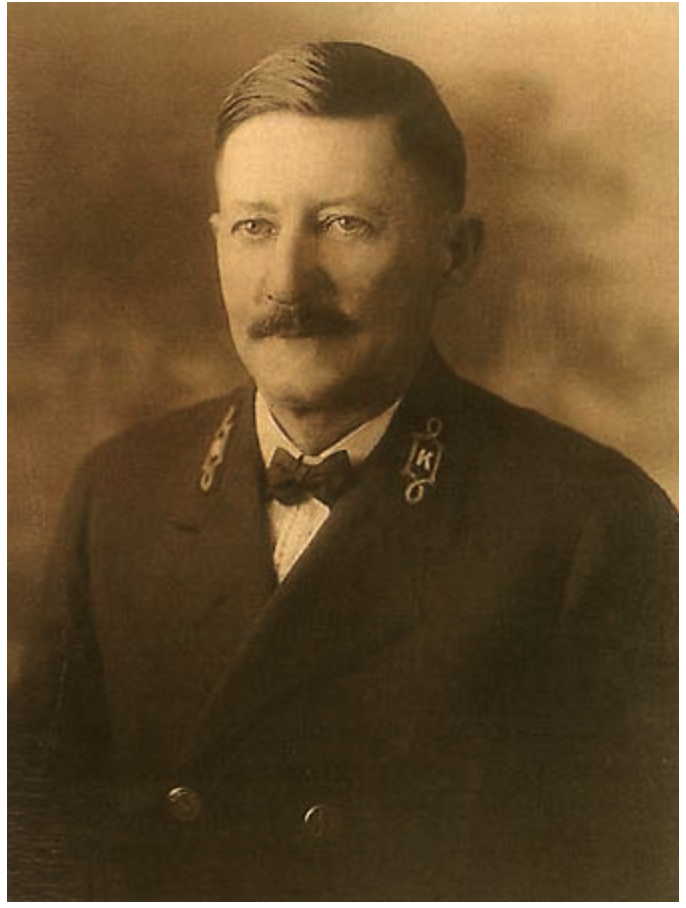
Lighthouse Keeper Frank Drew

Frank Drew, as all Keeper-class ships, has a strengthened "ice belt" along the waterline so that she can work on aids to navigation in ice-infested waters. Not only is the hull plating in the ice belt thicker than the rest of the hull, but framing members are closer together in areas that experience greater loads when working in ice. Higher grades of steel were used for hull plating in the ice belt to prevent cracking in cold temperatures. Her bow is sloped so that rather than smashing into ice, she rides up over it to break it with the weight of the ship. Frank Drew is capable of breaking flat, 9-inch thick ice at 3 knots. Despite her relatively southern basing, the ship has been called upon for ice-breaking services in her area of operations.

The ship carries a cutter boat on davits. She was originally equipped with a CB-M boat which was replaced in the mid-2010s with a CB-ATON-M boat. This was built by Metal Shark Aluminum Boats and was estimated to cost $210,000. The boat is 18 feet (5.5 m) long and are equipped with a Mercury Marine inboard/outboard diesel engine.

The ship's namesake is lighthouse keeper Frank Drew. He had a life-long connection to the Green Island lighthouse in Green Bay, about five miles from the mouth of the Menominee River where the cutter named for him was launched. He was born there when his father, Samuel Drew, was lighthouse keeper. Frank became assistant keeper in 1903 and was promoted to keeper in 1909. He served in this position until his retirement in 1929. He is credited with saving the lives of more than thirty people during his tenure.

Frank Drew replaced USCGC Red Cedar, which was decommissioned in 1997.

== Operational history ==
The Coast Guard took ownership of Frank Drew on 17 June 1999, and place her "in commission, special" status. She began her trip to Portsmouth on 28 June 1999. The trip took her from Lake Michigan through the Great Lakes and out into the Atlantic. She was placed in full commission at a ceremony at Nauticus in downtown Norfolk, Virginia on 5 April 2000.

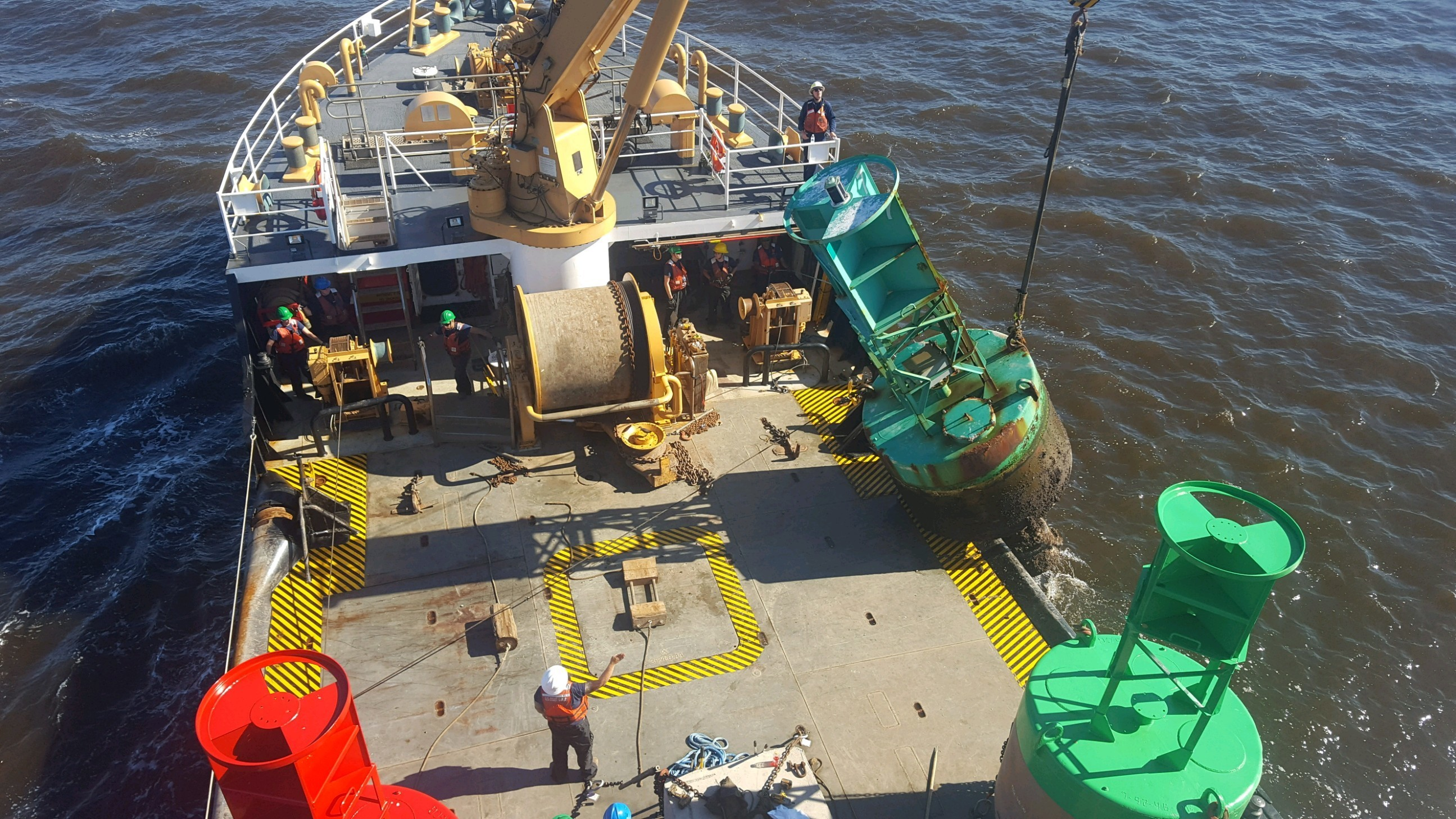
Frank Drew resetting buoys after Hurricane Florence

Frank Drew's buoy tending involves lifting them onto her deck where marine growth is scraped and pressure washed off, inspecting the buoy itself, and replacing lights, solar cells, and radar transponders. The mooring chain or synthetic cable is inspected and replaced as needed. The concrete block mooring anchor is also inspected. Aside from this routine maintenance, intense storms along the Atlantic coast create additional work for Frank Drew. For instance, Hurricane Florence displaced nearly 200 buoys in North Carolina, and the ship was one of the Coast Guard vessels which reset them in their proper locations. Emergency maintenance is also required when accidents damage or sink buoys. In 2016, for instance, a buoy near the Chesapeake Bay Bridge–Tunnel was hit by a vessel under tow and disappeared. The channel was closed to deep-draft shipping until a team, including Frank Drew, could assess the situation. Seasonal exchanges between large summer buoys and simpler buoys with ice-resistant hulls is also required on rivers prone to freezing.

The bulk of Frank Drew's year is spent at sea tending its buoys, or in port maintaining the ship. She has been asked to perform other missions, as described below.

=== Search and rescue ===
Frank Drew was dispatched to the 220-foot barge Dick Z near Lynnhaven Inlet in October 2010. The barge had taken on water and was almost completely sunk. In May 2018, Frank Drew was dispatched to search for a man whose boat capsized in the York River near Williamsburg.

=== Security ===
In the wake of the September 11, 2001 terrorist attacks, Frank Drew was dispatched to patrol sensitive areas in the Washington, D.C. area. In 2014 Frank Drew participated in training firefighters using simulated ship fires at the National Defense Reserve Fleet at Hampton Roads.

=== Public engagement ===
The Coast Guard has offered tours aboard Frank Drew on several occasions. These included stops during the ship's 1999 transit from Marinette to its new homeport in Portsmouth, in Green Bay, Wisconsin, and Charlevoix, Michigan
