= Frank Drew (lighthouse keeper) =

Frank Albert Drew
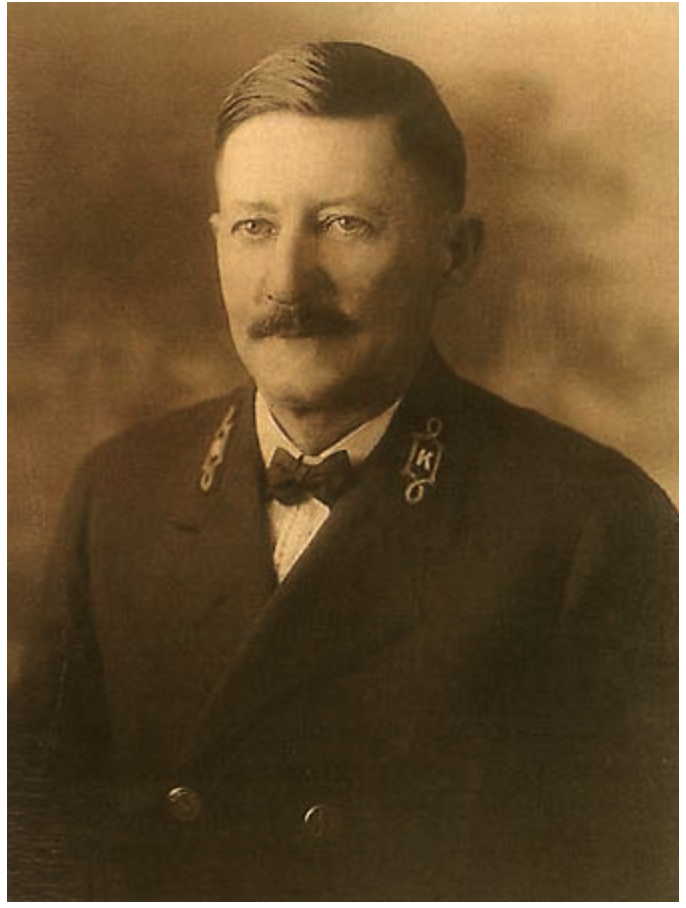
- Frank Drew
- Born: 1864; Green Island, Wisconsin
- Died: February 2, 1931 (aged 66–67); Marinette, Wisconsin
- Occupation: Lighthouse Keeper
- Spouse: Mary Louise Drew
- Children: Phyllis, George, Maude
- Parent(s): Samuel P. and Mary Lee Drew

Frank Albert Drew (1864–1931) was a lighthouse keeper. He was Assistant Keeper Pilot Island Light from 1899 to 1903, First Assistant Keeper, Green Island Light-Station from 1903 to 1909, and Keeper of Green Island Light-Station from 1904 to 1929.

The United States Coast Guard coastal buoy tender Frank Drew (WLM-557) based in Portsmouth, Virginia is named for him.

Frank was appointed to the United States Life-Saving Service in 1899 and promoted to head keeper in 1909, at which time his older brother George was made assistant keeper.

Over the next several years, Frank and George assisted numerous people who found themselves in trouble near Green Island:

In 1913, the pair rescued two men and two women and went to the assistance of twenty-three people on the gasoline boat Neptune, which was in serious danger. In 1915, the pair towed the disabled launch Alice W. to safety, assisted four men in a leaky motor boat, rescued two men and one woman in a disabled boat, and assisted the grounded launch Wesley L. In 1916, Frank helped free the stranded steamer Starlight off a reef. In 1920, Frank towed a disabled launch to Menominee. In 1921, Frank towed the disabled yacht Vanity to Menominee. In 1922, Frank rendered assistance to the disabled fishing tug Loyd, towing it to Marinette after making temporary repairs at the station. After having spent most of December 1925 on the island with no communication with the mainland, Keeper Drew and Alfred Cornell, his assistant, set off on foot for Marinette, Wisconsin. The five-mile trek across the frozen ice of Green Bay took three hours, as a gale was blowing and the men were forced to stop multiple times due to the extreme cold. An automatic acetylene light would serve to light Green Island until the keepers returned the following spring.

In October 1928, twenty-seven-year-old Thomas Mitchell, accompanied by his wife and a dog, took off from Sturgeon Bay for a flight across Green Bay in the “Miss Door County,” a Stinson monoplane owned by Cherryland Airways. While approaching Green Island at an altitude of 1,200 feet, the plane developed engine trouble, prompting Mitchell to land the plane on the island's short strip of flat beach. Friends awaiting the arrival of the couple in Menominee grew worried after they failed to arrive and notified the Coast Guard, but sea conditions were too poor to launch a search. Keeper Frank Drew put the couple up for the night on Green Island before taking them to Menominee the following day in his boat.

Frank Drew retired from the Lighthouse Service in 1929 and died unexpectedly in 1931 from heart failure. His grave is marked by a granite monument inscribed with a lighthouse. In more recent years, a metal plaque with the following inscription was attached to the monument: “On 17 June 1999, the U.S. Coast Guard Cutter FRANK DREW (WLM557) was commissioned in Marinette. The cutter bearing Captain Drew’s name services Aids to Navigation in the Chesapeake Bay.” The Coast Guard has honored some of the country's most distinguished keepers by naming their Keeper Class Coastal Buoy Tenders after them. In 2012, there were fourteen such tenders in service.
