= Le cap perdu =

1931 British film by Ewald André Dupont

Le cap perdu (The Lost Cape) is a 1931 British-made drama film directed by Ewald André Dupont and starring Harry Baur, Henri Bosc and Jean-Max. It was a French-language version of the film Cape Forlorn made by British International Pictures intended for distribution in France. A German-language version, Menschen im Käfig, was also released. It was based on a story by Frank Harvey.

== Partial cast ==
- Harry Baur – Le Capitaine Kell
- Henri Bosc – Kingsley
- Jean Max – Le matelot Cass
- Marcelle Romée – Hélène
