= USCGC Harry Claiborne =

Keeper-class coastal buoy tender of the United States Coast Guard

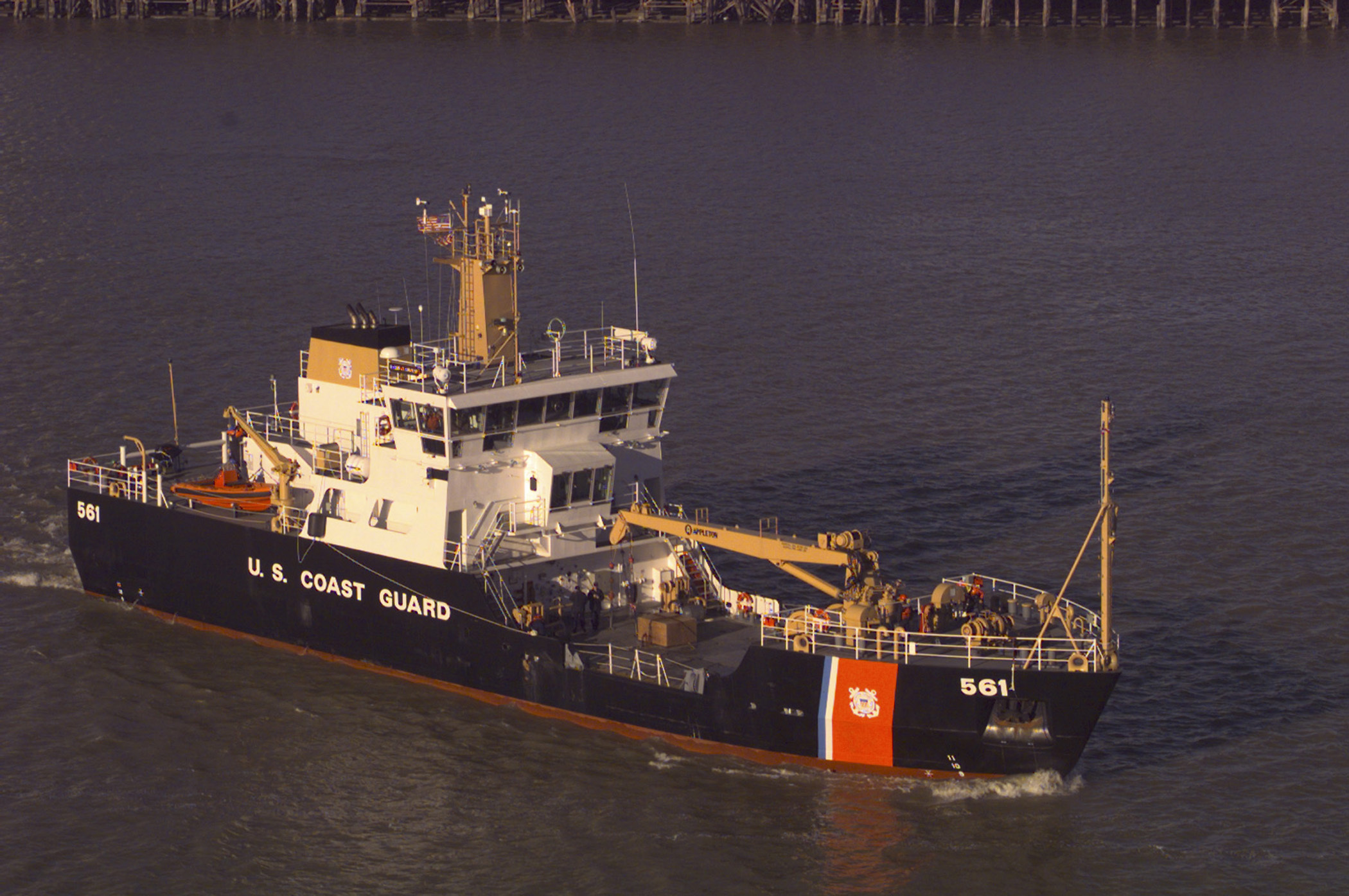
- USCGC Harry Claiborne

History

United States
- Name: Harry Claiborne
- Operator: US Coast Guard
- Builder: Marinette Marine Corporation
- Launched: 26 June 1999
- Commissioned: 31 March 2000
- Home port: Galveston, Texas
- Identification: IMO number: 9177296; Call sign: NNIC; MMSI number: 338953000
- Status: Active
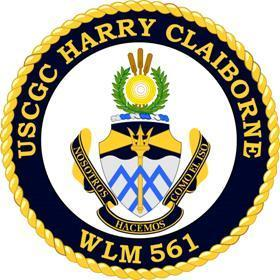
- Badge

General characteristics
- Type: Keeper-class buoy tender
- Displacement: 850 long tons (864 t) full load
- Length: 175 ft (53.3 m)
- Beam: 36 ft (11.0 m)
- Draft: 8 ft (2.4 m)
- Installed power: 2,000 hp (1,500 kW) sustained
- Propulsion: 2 × Caterpillar 3508 DITA Diesel engines; bow thruster, 500 hp (373 kW)
- Speed: 12 knots (22 km/h; 14 mph)
- Range: 2000 nautical miles at 10 kn
- Crew: 24 (2 Officers, 22 Enlisted)

USCGC Harry Claiborne (WLM-561) is a Keeper-class coastal buoy tender of the United States Coast Guard. Launched in 1999, she is home-ported in Galveston, Texas. Her primary mission is maintaining aids to navigation between the Mexican border and the mouth of the Mississippi River. Secondary missions include marine environmental protection, search and rescue, and security. She is assigned to the Eighth Coast Guard District.

== Construction and characteristics ==
On 22 June 1993 the Coast Guard awarded the contract for the Keeper-class vessels to Marinette Marine Corporation in the form of a firm contract for the lead ship and options for thirteen more. The Coast Guard exercised options for the final four ships, including Harry Claiborne, in September of 1997. The ship was launched on 26 June 1999 into the Menominee River. Harry Claiborne is the eleventh of the fourteen Keeper-class ships built.

Her hull was built of welded steel plates. She is 175 feet (53 m) long, with a beam of 36 feet (11 m), and a full-load draft of 8 feet (2.4 m). Harry Claiborne displaces 850 long tons fully loaded. Her gross register tonnage is 904, and her net register tonnage is 271. The top of the mast is 58.75 feet (17.91 m) above the waterline.

Rather than building the ship from the keel up as a single unit, Marinette Marine used a modular fabrication approach. Eight large modules, or "hull blocks" were built separately and then welded together.

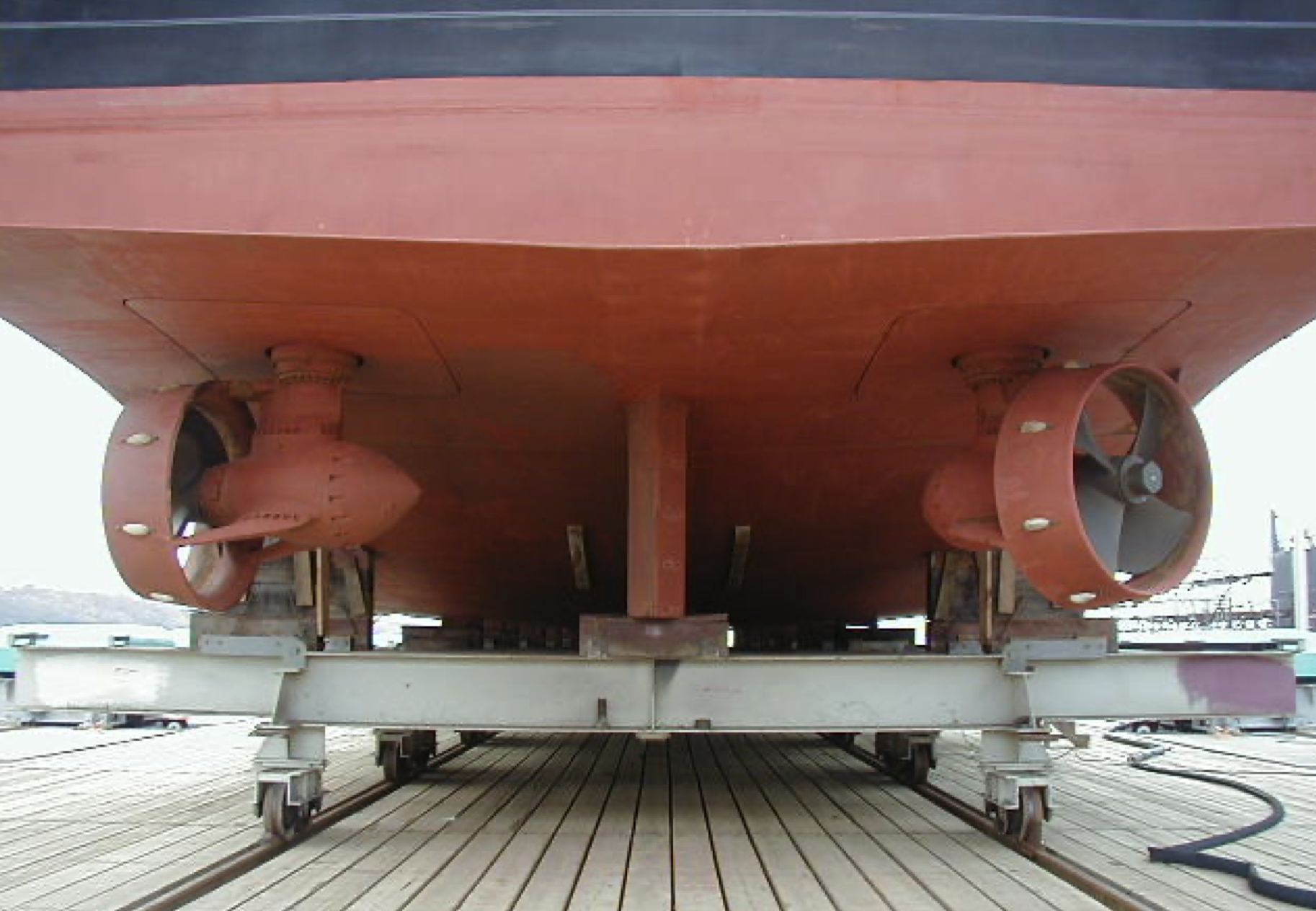
Z-drives on a Keeper-class ship

The ship has two Caterpillar 3508 DITA (direct-injection, turbocharged, aftercooled) 8-cylinder Diesel engines which produce 1000 horsepower each. These drive two Ulstein Z-drives. Keeper-class ships were the first Coast Guard cutters equipped with Z-drives, which markedly improved their maneuverability. The Z-drives have four-bladed propellers which are 57.1 inches (145 cm) in diameter and are equipped with Kort nozzles. They can be operated in "tiller mode" where the Z-drives turn in the same direction to steer the ship, or in "Z-conn mode" where the two Z-drives can turn in different directions to achieve specific maneuvering objectives. An implication of the Z-drives is that there is no reverse gear or rudder aboard Harry Claiborne. To back the ship, the Z-drives are turned 180 degrees which drives the ship stern-first even though the propellers are spinning in the same direction as they do when the ship is moving forward. Her maximum speed is 12 knots. Her tanks can hold 16,385 gallons of diesel fuel which gives her an unrefueled range of 2,000 nautical miles at 10 knots.

She has a 500 horsepower bow thruster. The Z-drives and bow thruster can be linked in a Dynamic Positioning System. This gives Harry Claiborne the ability to hold position in the water even in heavy currents, winds, and swells. This advanced capability is useful in bringing buoys aboard that can weigh more than 16,000 lbs.

Electrical power aboard is provided by three Caterpillar 3406 DITA generators which produce 285 Kw each. She also has a 210 kW emergency generator, which is a Caterpillar 3406 DIT.

The buoy deck has 1,335 square feet (124.0 m^{2}) of working area. A crane with a boom 42 feet (13 m) long lifts buoys and their mooring anchors onto the deck. The crane can lift up to 20,000 pounds (9,100 kg).

The ships' fresh water tanks can hold 7,339 gallons. She has three ballast tanks that can be filled to maintain her trim, and tanks for oily waste water, sewage, gray water, new lubrication oil, and waste oil.

Accommodations were designed for mixed gender crews from the start. Crew size and composition has varied over the years. When she first entered service, her complement was 18, commanded by a chief warrant officer. Her current complement is two officers and twenty-two enlisted personnel.

Harry Claiborne, as all Keeper-class ships, has a strengthened "ice belt" along the waterline so that she can work on aids to navigation in ice-infested waters. Not only is the hull plating in the ice belt thicker than the rest of the hull, but framing members are closer together in areas that experience greater loads when working in ice. Higher grades of steel were used for hull plating in the ice belt to prevent cracking in cold temperatures. Her bow is sloped so that rather than smashing into ice, she rides up over it to break it with the weight of the ship. Harry Claiborne is capable of breaking flat, 9-inch thick ice at 3 knots.

The ship carries a cutter boat on davits. She was originally equipped with a CB-M boat which was replaced in the mid-2010s with a CB-ATON-M boat. This was built by Metal Shark Aluminum Boats and was estimated to cost $210,000. The boat is 18 feet (5.5 m) long and are equipped with a Mercury Marine inboard/outboard diesel engine.

The ship's namesake is lighthouse keeper Harry C. Claiborne. Claiborne was the principal lighthouse keeper of the Bolivar Point light when the Hurricane of 1900 hit the Texas coast near Galveston. Storm surge covered the low-lying barrier island where the light was located, but before the ground floor entrance to the lighthouse was submerged, over 125 people had crowded into the building. Claiborne was able to feed them from his provisions, and everyone who made it into the lighthouse survived. Fifteen years later, another class 4 hurricane pounded the Galveston area and 50 people took shelter with Claiborne in his lighthouse.

Harry Claiborne replaced USCGC Papaw, which was decommissioned in 1999.

== Operational history ==
The Coast Guard took ownership of Harry Claiborne on 28 October 1999, and placed her "in commission, special" status. During the 6000-mile trip from Wisconsin to her new homeport in Texas, she made 35 port calls. She sailed from Lake Michigan through the Great Lakes, out into the Atlantic, and then into the Gulf of Mexico. The ship's crew was hosted ashore for Christmas dinner in Rockland, Maine. She was placed in full commission at a ceremony in Galveston on 31 March 2000. Rear Admiral Paul Pluta, commander of the 8th Coast Guard District was the featured speaker at the event.

Harry Claiborne's buoy tending involves lifting them onto her deck where marine growth is scraped and pressure washed off, inspecting the buoy itself, and replacing lights, solar cells, and radar transponders. The mooring chain or synthetic cable is inspected and replaced as needed. The concrete block mooring anchor is also inspected. Major storms along the Gulf Coast frequently damage and displace buoys. Harry Claiborne is frequently called upon to survey its buoy fleet after hurricanes to repair and reset buoys that have been dragged off-station.

The bulk of Harry Claiborne's year is spent at sea tending its buoys, or in port maintaining the ship. She has been asked to perform other missions, as described below.

=== Search and rescue ===
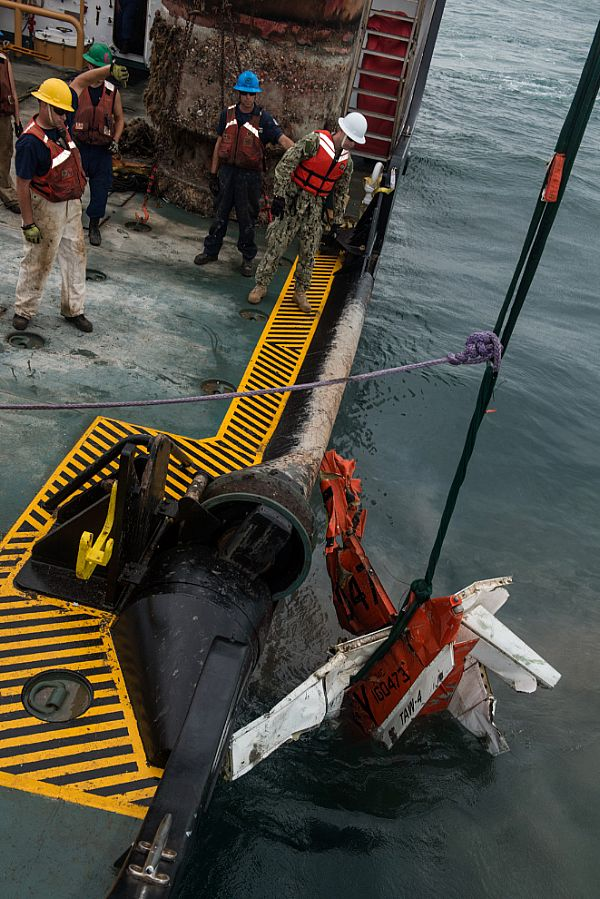
Tail section of crashed T-34C is hoisted aboard Harry Claiborne

In November 2009, Harry Claiborne searched for a T-34C training aircraft on a flight from Naval Air Station Corpus Christi which crashed in the Gulf of Mexico. The ship recovered the larger parts of the aircraft after its location was discovered by a Navy diving team.

A number of Coast Guard units, including Harry Claiborne, searched for a missing diver about 35 miles south of Cameron, Louisiana in June of 2017 The search was unsuccessful.

=== Security ===
Harry Claiborne served as a training platform for the Coast Guard Maritime Safety and Security Team Galveston to practice boarding ships from a helicopter in March 2007.

=== Marine Environment Protection ===
In February 2008, Harry Claiborne deployed the Vessel of Opportunity Skimming System in a training exercise for oil spill recovery. After the Deepwater Horizon oil spill in April 2010, she used the system as part of the clean-up effort.

=== Public engagement ===
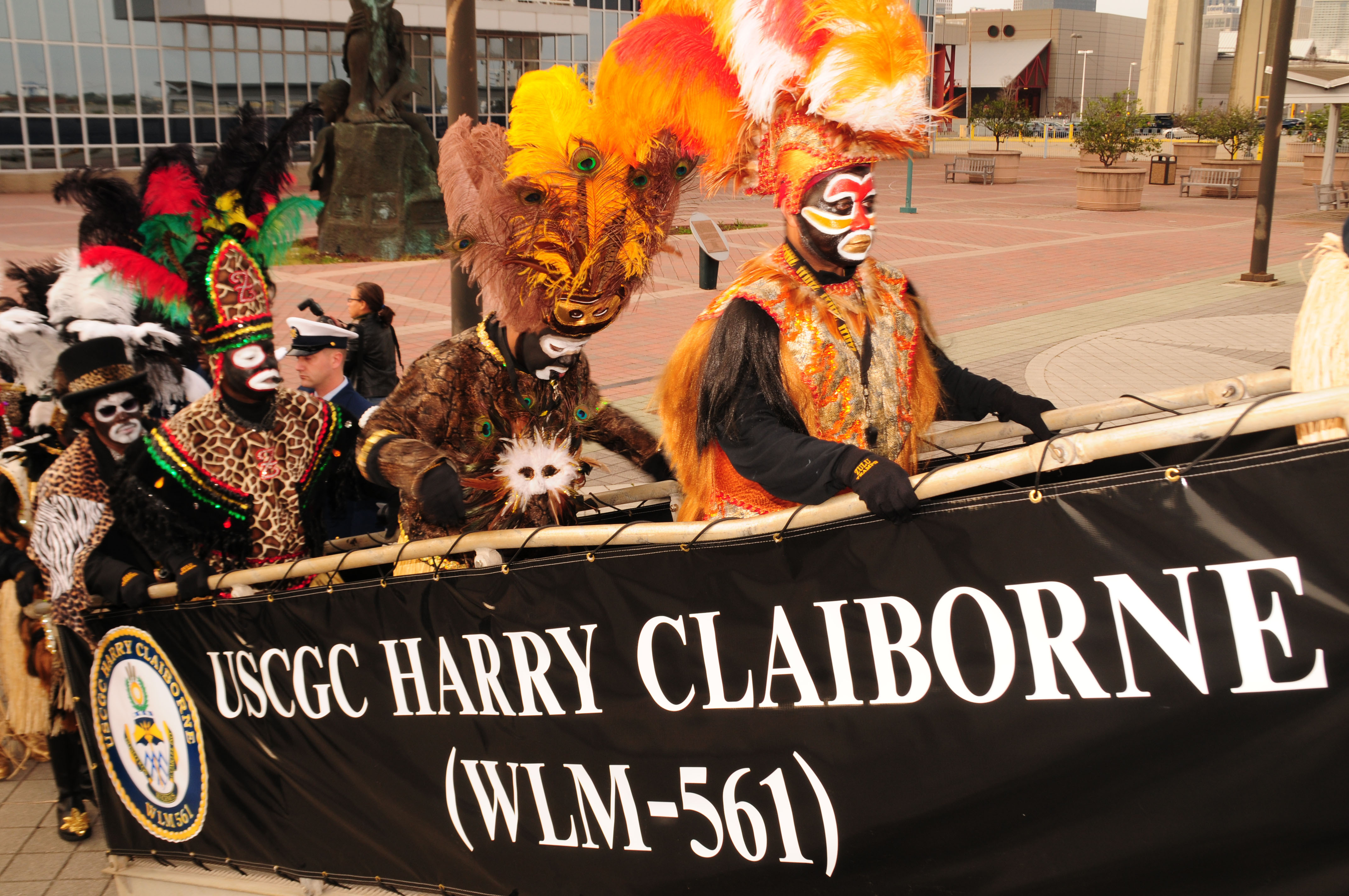
2012 Lundi Gras celebrants boarding Harry Claiborne

The Coast Guard has offered tours aboard Harry Claiborne on several occasions. These include tours in Green Bay, Wisconsin in November 1999, shortly before sailing to Galveston for the first time.

Harry Claiborne has participated in Mardi Gras festivities in New Orleans for several years. She delivered Lundi Gras celebrants downtown in 2010 and 2012. Former first lady Laura Bush was aboard for the 2010 event. She delivered the monarchs of the 2014 Mardi Gras celebration to downtown for the event kick-off. Also on board for the trip were Rear Admiral Kevin S. Cook, commander of the 8th Coast Guard District, and U.S. Marine Corps Lieutenant General Steven Hummer.

=== Orion spacecraft testing in 2017 ===
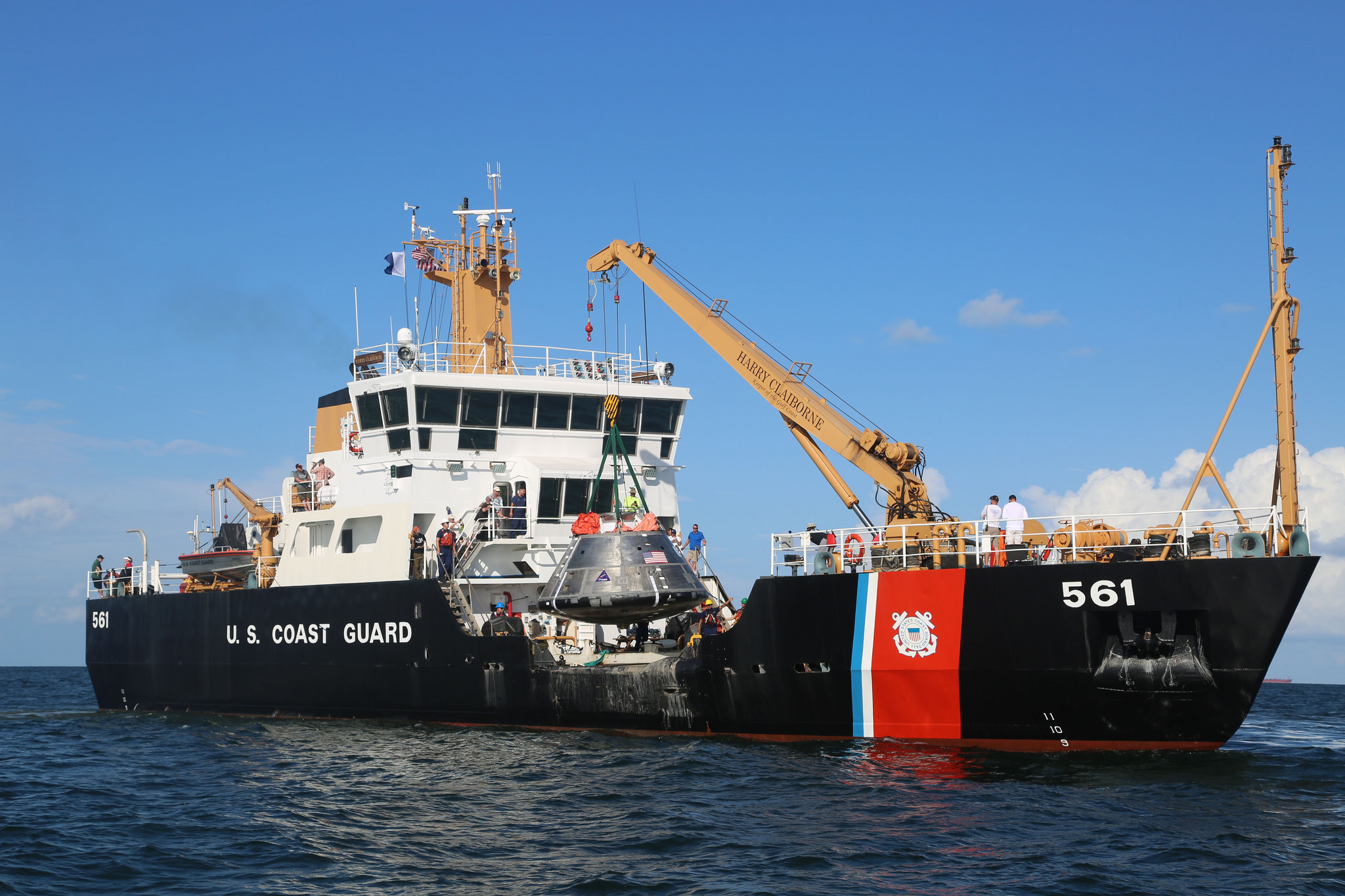
Harry Claiborne hoisting Orion spacecraft

NASA's Orion spacecraft is designed to return to earth by splashing down in the Pacific Ocean. While under normal circumstances, the spacecraft would be met by a full recovery team, some events might leave the astronauts to their own devices. The Johnson Space Center decided to test astronauts ability to leave the capsule on their own and enter the raft with which they are equipped. In July 2017 Harry Claiborne was dispatched to carry the spacecraft to waters off Galveston for the tests and then hoist it back on board.

=== 2020 collision ===
On 11 October 2020, Harry Claiborne was stationary in the Sabine Pass channel while resetting a buoy that had been moved off-station by Hurricane Delta. The offshore supply vessel Charamie Bo-truc 33 was in the channel, heading to sea, when it came upon Harry Claibourne. Her captain contacted the commander of the buoy tender by radio and proposed to pass the ship on her starboard side, which was agreed even though it would take her outside the shipping channel. As Cheramie Bo-truc 33 attempted the maneuver, her captain noted the shoaling water and tried to turn back into the channel. Instead, he hit Harry Claiborne on her stern while traveling at six knots. The collision punched a foot-long hole in the steel and severely dented and buckled her transom. After the collision, Cheramie Bo-truc 33's momentum spun her toward the bank and she went aground roughly 40 feet from Harry Claiborne. The grounded vessel was refloated by pumping off ballast water, but then hit Harry Claiborne a second time as the current set her toward the buoy tender. The National Transportation Safety Board held the captain of the offshore supply vessel largely responsible for the incident.

After the incident, unusual noises from the port Z-drive caused Harry Claiborne to return to port on one engine. The estimated damage to the ship was $440,879.
