= Menschen im Käfig =

1930 film directed by Ewald André Dupont

Menschen im Käfig (People in the Cage) is a 1930 British-made drama film directed by Ewald André Dupont and starring Conrad Veidt, Fritz Kortner and Tala Birell. It was the German-language version of the 1931 British International Pictures film Cape Forlorn. A French-language version, Le cap perdu, was also produced at the same time. It was based on a story by Frank Harvey.

== Cast ==
- Conrad Veidt – Kingsley
- Fritz Kortner – Captain Kell
- Tala Birell – Eileen Kell
- Heinrich George – Cass
- Julius Brandt – Parsons
