= Cape Forlorn =

1931 film directed by Ewald André Dupont

- Directed by: Ewald André Dupont
- Written by: Victor Kendall
- Based on: Cape Forlorn by Frank Harvey
- Produced by: Ewald André Dupont
- Starring: Fay Compton; Frank Harvey; Ian Hunter
- Cinematography: Walter Blakeley; Jack E. Cox; Claude Friese-Greene
- Edited by: A.C. Hammond
- Music by: John Reynders
- Production company: British International Pictures
- Distributed by: Wardour Films
- Release date: 8 January 1931
- Running time: 86 minutes
- Country: United Kingdom
- Language: English
- Budget: £50,000

Cape Forlorn is a 1931 British drama film directed by Ewald André Dupont and starring Fay Compton, Frank Harvey and Ian Hunter. It was the English-language version of a British International Pictures multiple-language production with France and Germany which also made Le cap perdu and Menschen im Käfig. The film is also known as The Love Storm.

It was based on a stage play by Harvey.

== Plot ==
A lighthouse on a lonely coast of New Zealand is looked after by lighthouse keeper William Kell. Kell marries Eileen, a dancer in a cabaret, who winds up having an affair with Kell's assistant, Cass. Eileen then begins flirting with a stranger, Kingsley, an absconder who is rescued from the wreck of a motor launch. Kingsley and Cass quarrel; the woman rushes upon the scene with a revolver, fires blindly, and Cass Is shot dead.

== Cast ==
- Fay Compton as Eileen Kell
- Frank Harvey as William Kell
- Ian Hunter as Gordon Kingsley
- Edmund Willard as Henry Cass
- Donald Calthrop as Parsons

== Production ==
Shooting took place in late 1930 and it was made in English, French and German.

== Release ==
The film was originally banned in Australia by the censor but this was overturned on appeal after a number of cuts were agreed upon.

Reviews were poor.

Shortly after the film was released in Australia, Harvey appeared in a production of the play at the Criterion Theatre in Sydney. Harvey said this was in part because the film version had so changed his play.
