= Cape Ann Light Station =

Two lighthouses in Massachusetts, US

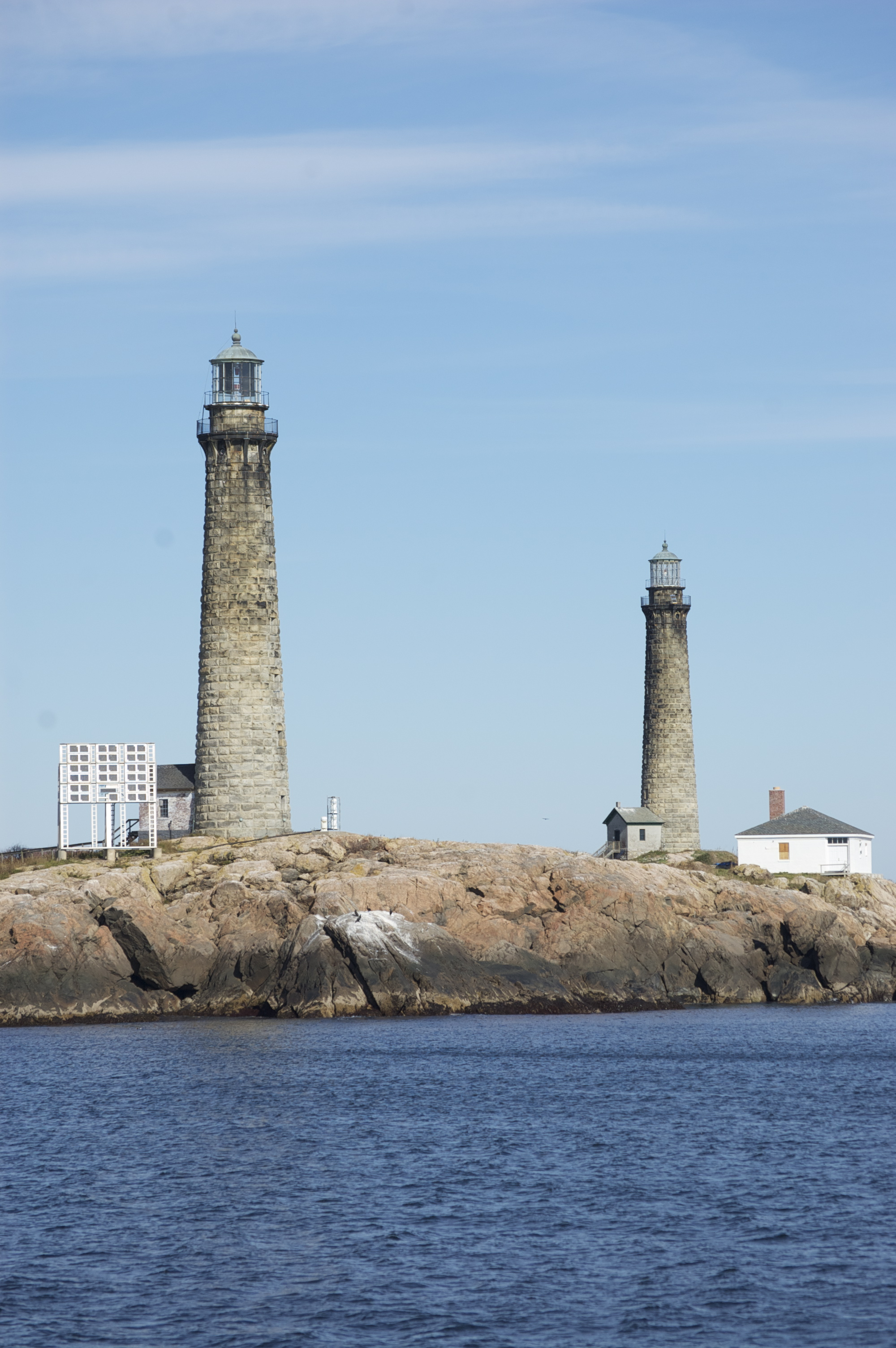
- Location: Rockport, United States
- Coordinates: 42°38′13″N 70°34′30″W
- Constructed: 1771
- Heritage: National Historic Landmark, National Register of Historic Places listed place
- Cape Ann Light
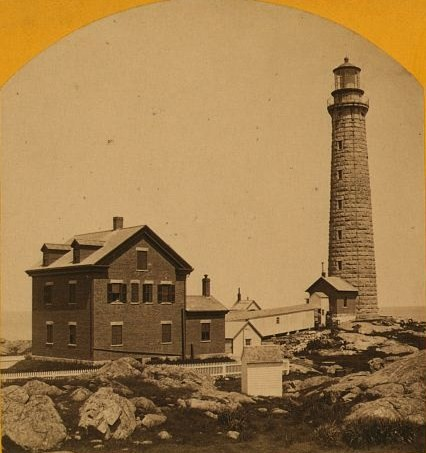
- South Tower of the Cape Ann Twin Lighthouses, ca. 1869
- Foundation: granite (surface rock)
- Construction: cut granite
- Automated: 1979
- Height: 124 feet (38 m)
- Shape: conical
- Markings: unpainted
- Heritage: National Register of Historic Places contributing property
- Fog signal: HORN: 2 every 60s
- First lit: 1861
- Focal height: 166 feet (51 m)
- Lens: 1st order Fresnel lens (original), VRB-25 (current)
- Range: 17 nautical miles (31 km; 20 mi)
- Characteristic: Fl R 5s
- Thacher Island North Light
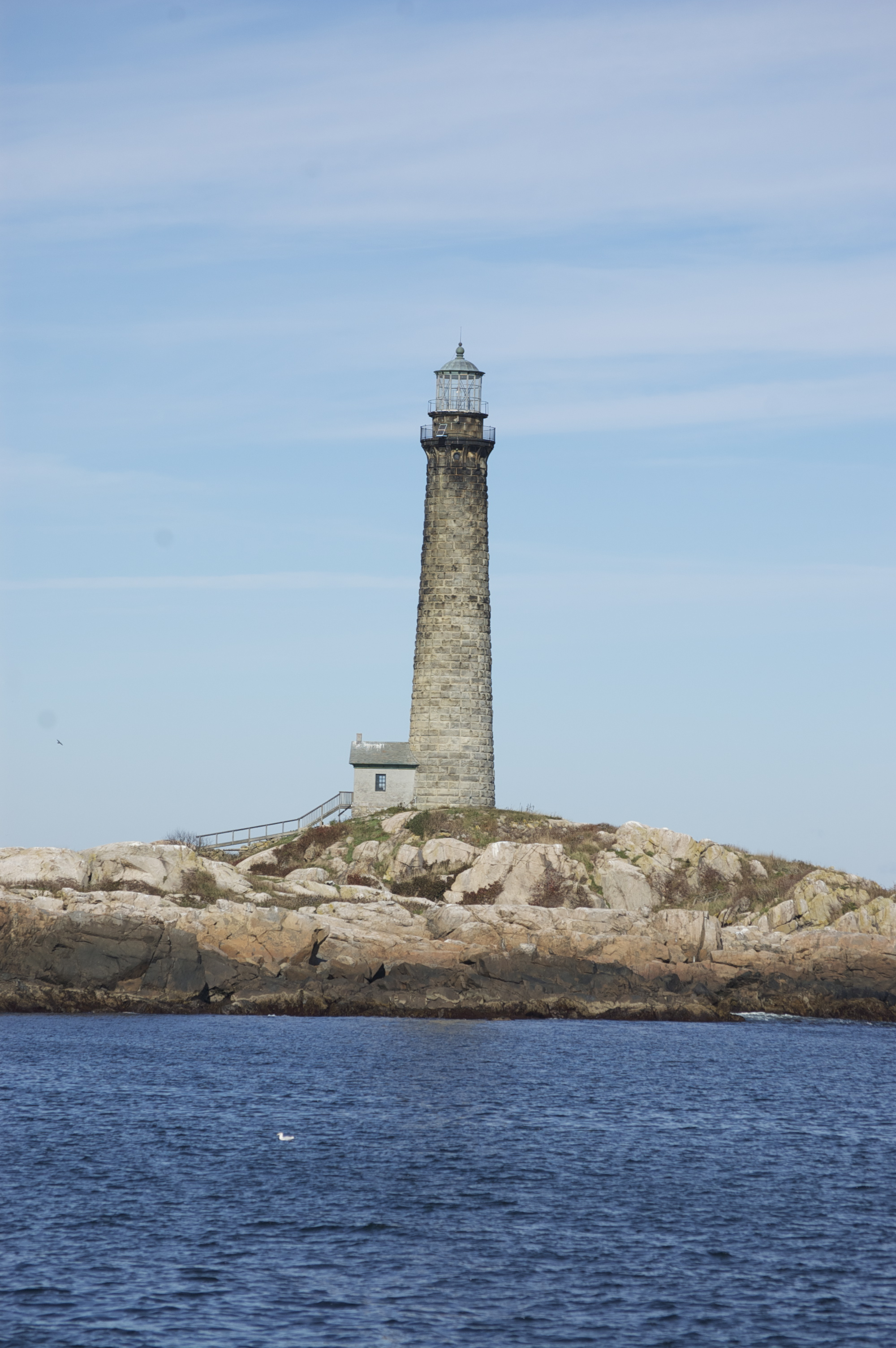
- Coordinates: 42°38′21″N 70°34′29″W
- Constructed: 1771
- Foundation: granite (surface rock)
- Construction: cut granite
- Automated: 1988
- Height: 124 feet (38 m)
- Shape: conical
- Markings: natural, unpainted granite
- Heritage: National Register of Historic Places contributing property
- First lit: 1861, 1989
- Deactivated: 1932-1988
- Focal height: 162 feet (49 m)
- Lens: 1st order Fresnel lens (original), 200 millimetres (7.9 in) (current)
- Characteristic: F Y
- Cape Ann Light Station (Thacher Island Twin Lights)
- U.S. National Register of Historic Places
- U.S. National Historic Landmark District
- Nearest city: Rockport, Massachusetts
- Area: 50 acres (20 ha)
- Built: 1860
- MPS: Lighthouses of Massachusetts TR (AD)
- NRHP reference No.: 71000355

Significant dates
- Added to NRHP: October 7, 1971
- Designated NHLD: January 3, 2001

The Cape Ann Light Station on Thacher Island, off Cape Ann in Rockport, Massachusetts, is nationally significant as the last light station to be established under colonial rule and the first station in the United States to mark a navigational hazard rather than a harbor entrance. The current pair of lighthouses were built in 1861. They were both equipped with first order Fresnel lenses, which stood approximately 10 feet (3.0 m) high and weighed several tons (tonnes).

After being decommissioned in the early 1980s, the lens from the south tower was moved to the U.S. Coast Guard Museum at the United States Coast Guard Academy in New London, Connecticut. In 2013 a joint effort by the Cape Ann Museum and the Thacher Island Association brought the lens back to Cape Ann. The first order lens is now on display at the Cape Ann Museum in Gloucester, Massachusetts.

When these lights were built, there was no way to produce a flashing light and, occasionally mariners would confuse one light for another with disastrous results. The only way to create a distinction was to build more than one light. There were two lights at Plymouth and three at Nauset Beach. Gradually as it became possible to create flashes with a revolving lens system, the multiple lights were discontinued, so that while the south light is an active, Coast Guard maintained light, the north tower was discontinued in 1932. It was relighted as a Private Aid to Navigation in 1989. The south light is now owned by the Town of Rockport and managed by the Thacher Island Association; the north light is owned by the US Fish and Wildlife Service.

The station was added to the National Register of Historic Places as Twin Lights Historic District – Cape Ann Light Station on October 7, 1971, reference number 71000355. In 2001 they became the 9th light station to be recognized as a National Historic Landmark.

== Cape Ann Light ==
Cape Ann Light is the southernmost of the two lighthouses that comprise the station.

== Thacher Island North Light ==
Thacher Island North Light is the northernmost of the two lighthouses that comprise the station.

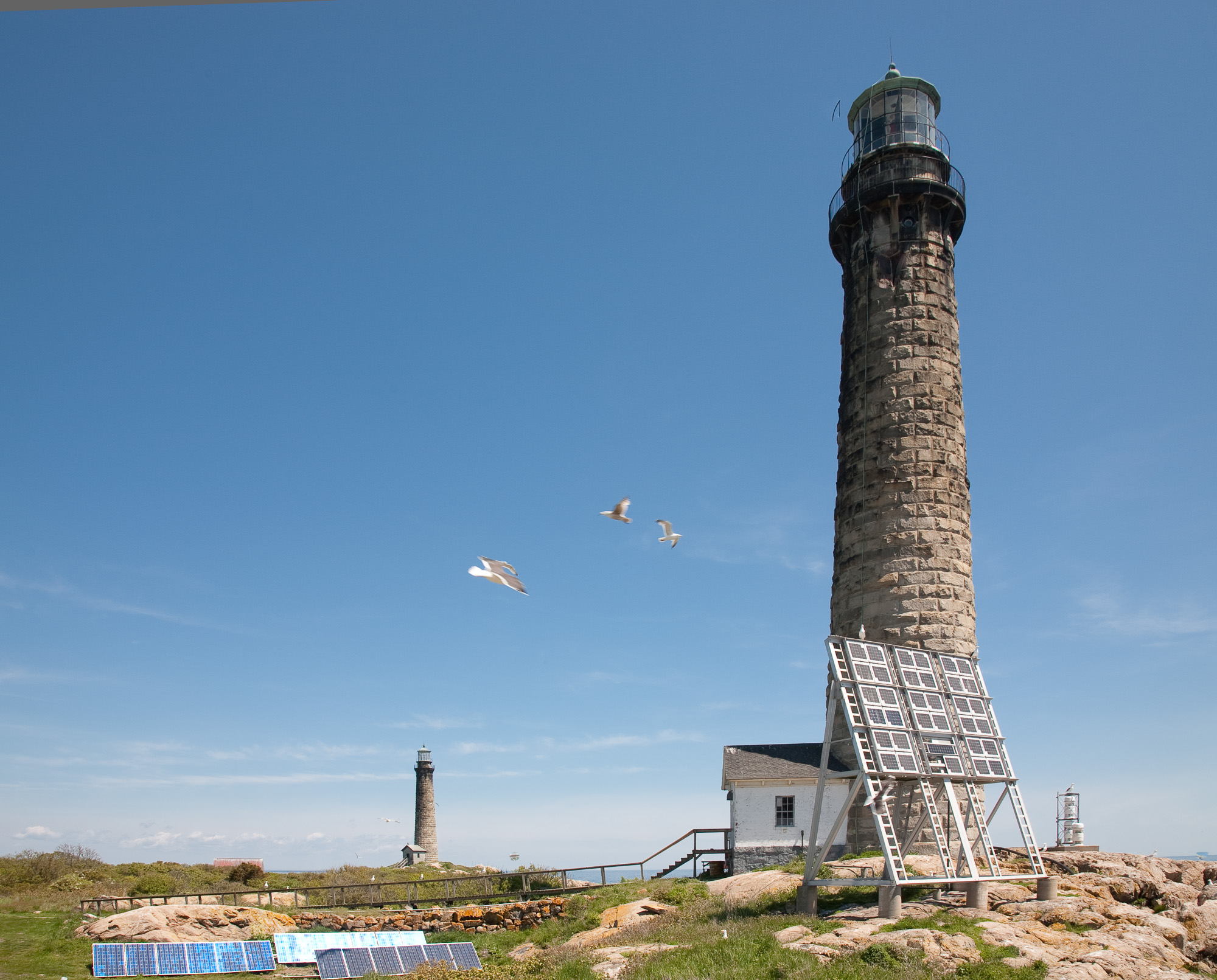
Thacher Island Lighthouses in 2009

== Nomenclature ==
- The south light's official name in the US Coast Guard Light List is Cape Ann Light, number 1-295.
- The north light's official name is Thacher Island North Light, number 1-305.
- The National Historic Landmark listing name is Twin Lights Historic District – Cape Ann Light Station.
- The lights are known locally as the Twin Lights or Thacher Island Lights.

== See also ==
- National Register of Historic Places listings in Essex County, Massachusetts
