= USCGC Katherine Walker =

Keeper-class coastal buoy tender of the United States Coast Guard

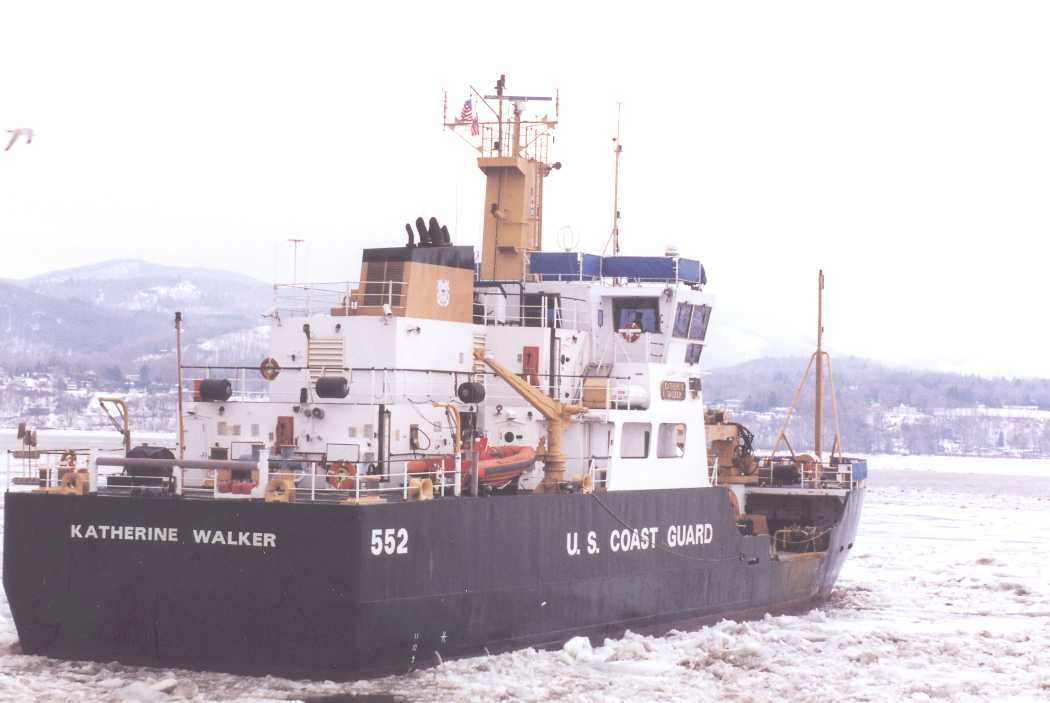

History

United States
- Name: Kathrine Walker
- Namesake: Katherine Walker, the keeper of the Robbins Reef Light
- Owner: United States
- Operator: U.S. Coast Guard
- Builder: Marinette Marine
- Launched: 14 September 1996
- Commissioned: 1 November 1997
- Home port: Bayonne, New Jersey
- Identification: Hull number: WLM-552; IMO number: 9155597; MMSI number: 368975000; Callsign: NKFW
- Motto: Keeper of New York Harbor
- Status: Active
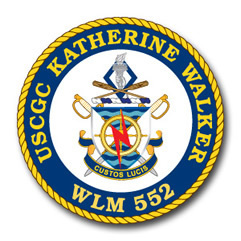
- Badge

General characteristics
- Type: Keeper-class coastal buoy tender
- Length: 175 ft (53.3 m)
- Beam: 36 ft (11.0 m)
- Draft: 8 ft (2.4 m)
- Installed power: 2,000 hp (1,500 kW) sustained
- Propulsion: 2 × Caterpillar 3508 DITA Diesel engines; bow thruster, 500 hp (373 kW)
- Speed: 12 knots (22 km/h; 14 mph)
- Range: 2000 nautical miles at 10 kn
- Crew: 24 (2 Officers, 22 Enlisted)

USCGS Katherine Walker (WLM-552) is a Keeper-class coastal buoy tender of the United States Coast Guard. Launched in 1996, she has spent her entire career homeported at Bayonne, New Jersey. Her primary mission is to maintain 335 aids to navigation in New York Harbor, Long Island Sound, and surrounding waters. She is assigned to the First Coast Guard District.

== Construction and characteristics ==
On 22 June 1993 the Coast Guard awarded the contract for the Keeper-class vessels in the form of a firm contract for the lead ship and options for thirteen more. On 7 February 1996, it exercised options for the 2nd through the 5th vessels, including Katherine Walker. She was built by Marinette Marine Corporation at its shipyard in Marinette, Wisconsin. She was the second of the fourteen Keeper-class vessels completed. Originally scheduled for August 1996, her launch was delayed slightly by a fire. The ship was launched on 14 September 1996, into the Menominee River.

Her hull was built of welded steel plates. She is 175 feet (53 m) long, with a beam of 36 feet (11 m), and a full-load draft of 8 feet (2.4 m). Katherine Walker displaces 850 long tons fully loaded. Her gross register tonnage is 904, and her net register tonnage is 271. The top of the mast is 58.75 feet (17.91 m) above the waterline.

Rather than building the ship from the keel up as a single unit, Marinette Marine used a modular fabrication approach. Eight large modules, or "hull blocks" were built separately and then welded together.

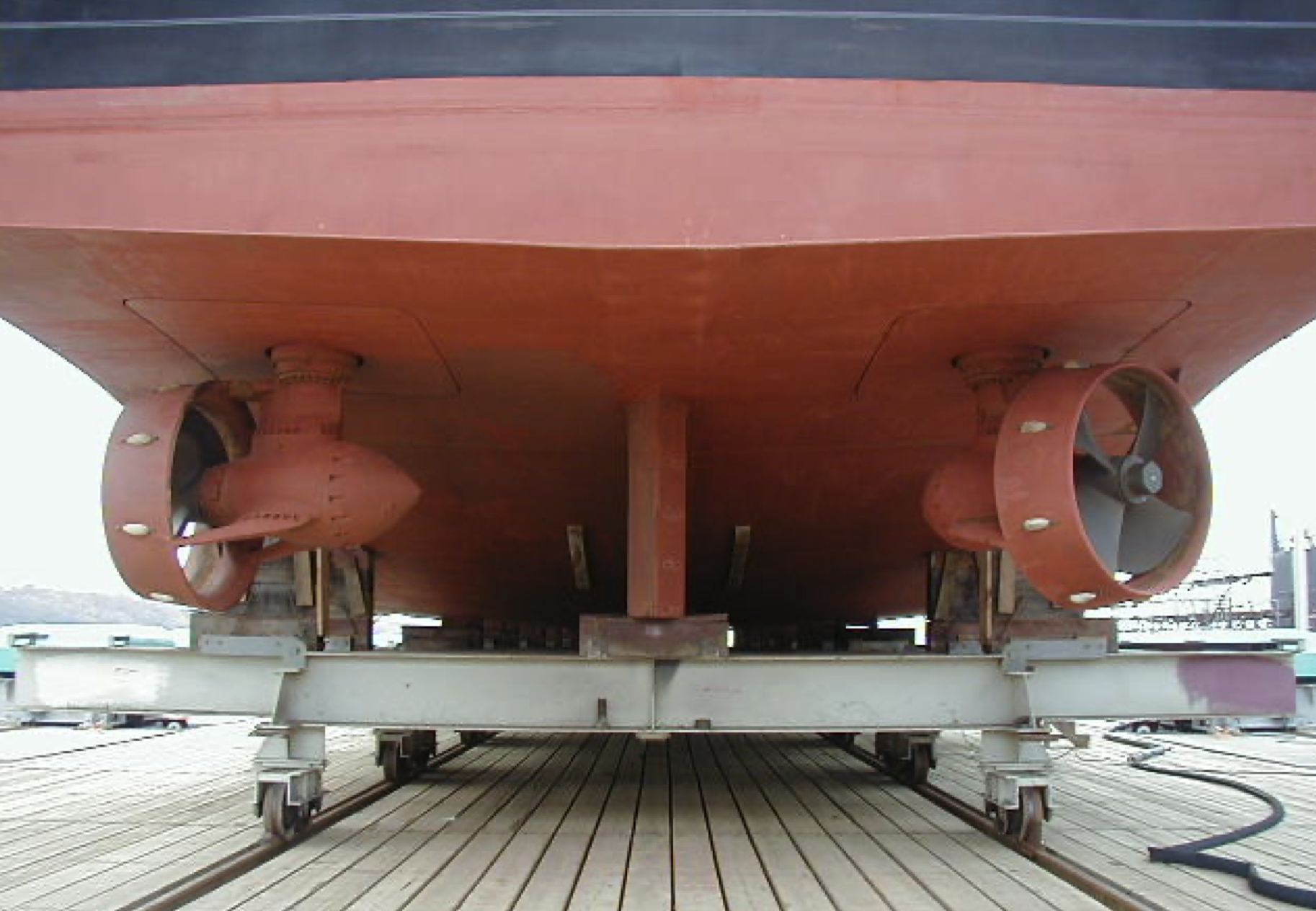
Z-drives on a Keeper-class ship

The ship has two Caterpillar 3508 DITA (direct-injection, turbocharged, aftercooled) 8-cylinder Diesel engines which produce 1000 horsepower each. These drive two Ulstein Z-drives. Keeper-class ships were the first Coast Guard cutters equipped with Z-drives, which markedly improved their maneuverability. The Z-drives have four-bladed propellers which are 57.1 inches (145 cm) in diameter and are equipped with Kort nozzles. They can be operated in "tiller mode" where the Z-drives turn in the same direction to steer the ship, or in "Z-conn mode" where the two Z-drives can turn in different directions to achieve specific maneuvering objectives. An implication of the Z-drives is that there is no reverse gear or rudder aboard Katherine Walker. In order to back the ship, the Z-drives are turned 180 degrees, which drives the ship stern-first even though the propellers are spinning in the same direction as they do when the ship is moving forward. Her maximum speed is 12 knots. Her tanks can hold 16,385 gallons of diesel fuel which gives her an unrefueled range of 2,000 nautical miles at 10 knots.

She has a 500 horsepower bow thruster. The Z-drives and bow thruster can be linked in a Dynamic Positioning System. This gives Katherine Walker the ability to hold position in the water even in heavy currents, winds, and swells. This advanced capability is useful in bringing buoys aboard that can weigh more than 16,000 lbs.

Electrical power aboard is provided by three Caterpillar 3406 DITA generators which produce 285 Kw each. She also has a 210 Kw emergency generator, which is a Caterpillar 3406 DIT.

The buoy deck has 1,335 square feet (124.0 m^{2}) of working area. A crane with a boom 42 feet (13 m) long lifts buoys and their mooring anchors onto the deck. The crane can lift up to 20,000 pounds (9,100 kg).

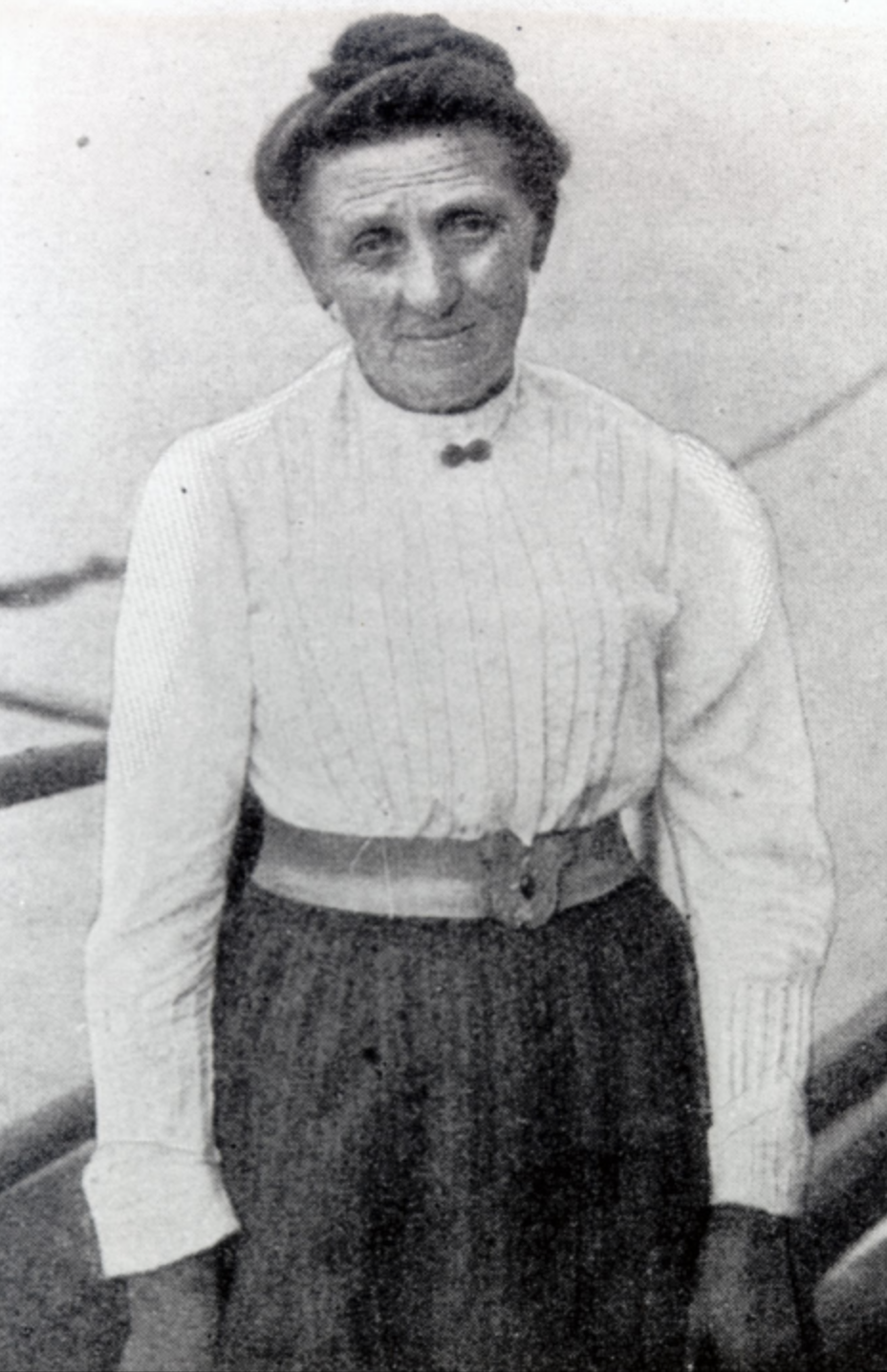
Lighthouse keeper Katherine Walker, c.1909

The ships' fresh water tanks can hold 7,339 gallons. She also has three ballast tanks that can be filled to maintain trim, and tanks for oily waste water, sewage, gray water, new lubrication oil, and waste oil.

Accommodations were designed for mixed gender crews from the start. Crew size and composition has varied over the years. When she was commissioned in 1997, she had a crew of 18, commanded by a Chief Warrant Officer. As of 2016, this had grown to 2 officers and 22 enlisted personnel.

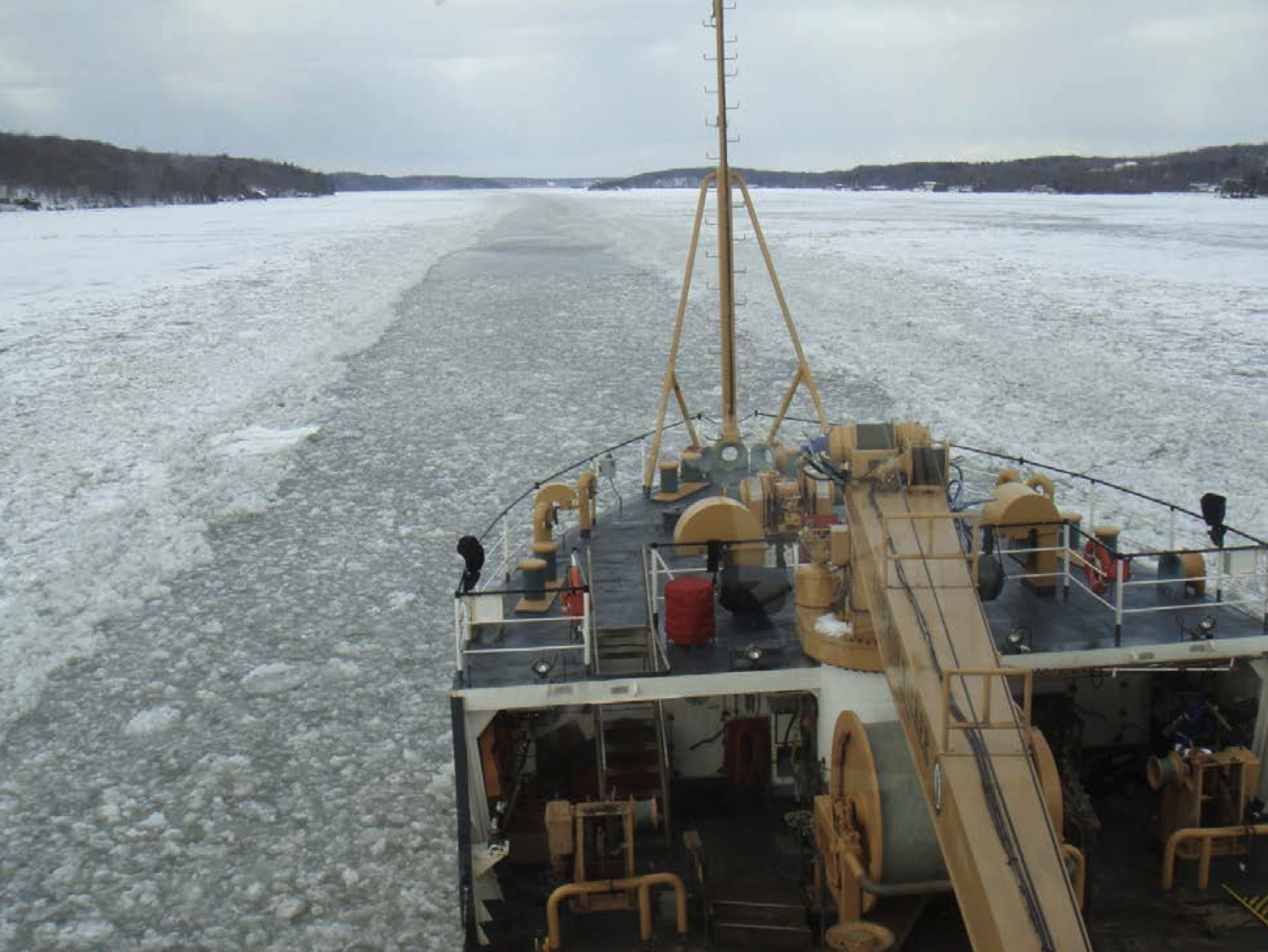
Katherine Walker breaking ice on the Hudson River in 2011

Katherine Walker, as all Keeper-class ships, has a strengthened "ice belt" along the waterline so that she can work on aids to navigation in ice-infested waters. Not only is the hull plating in the ice belt thicker than the rest of the hull, but framing members are closer together in areas that experience greater loads when working in ice. Higher grades of steel were used for hull plating in the ice belt to prevent cracking in cold temperatures. Her bow is sloped so that rather than smashing into ice, she ride up over it and break it with the weight of the ship. Katherine Walker is capable of breaking flat, 9-inch thick ice at 3 knots.

The ship carries a cutter boat on davits. She was originally equipped with a CB-M boat which was replaced in the mid-2010s with a CB-ATON-M boat. This was built by Metal Shark Aluminum Boats and was estimated to cost $210,000. The boat is 18 feet (5.5 m) long and are equipped with a Mercury Marine inboard/outboard diesel engine.

The ship's namesake is Katherine Walker, the keeper of the Robbins Reef Light. Walker was responsible for saving the lives of 50 people.

Katherine Walker replaced USCGC Red Beech and took over her buoy-tending duties in the New York Harbor area.

== Service history ==
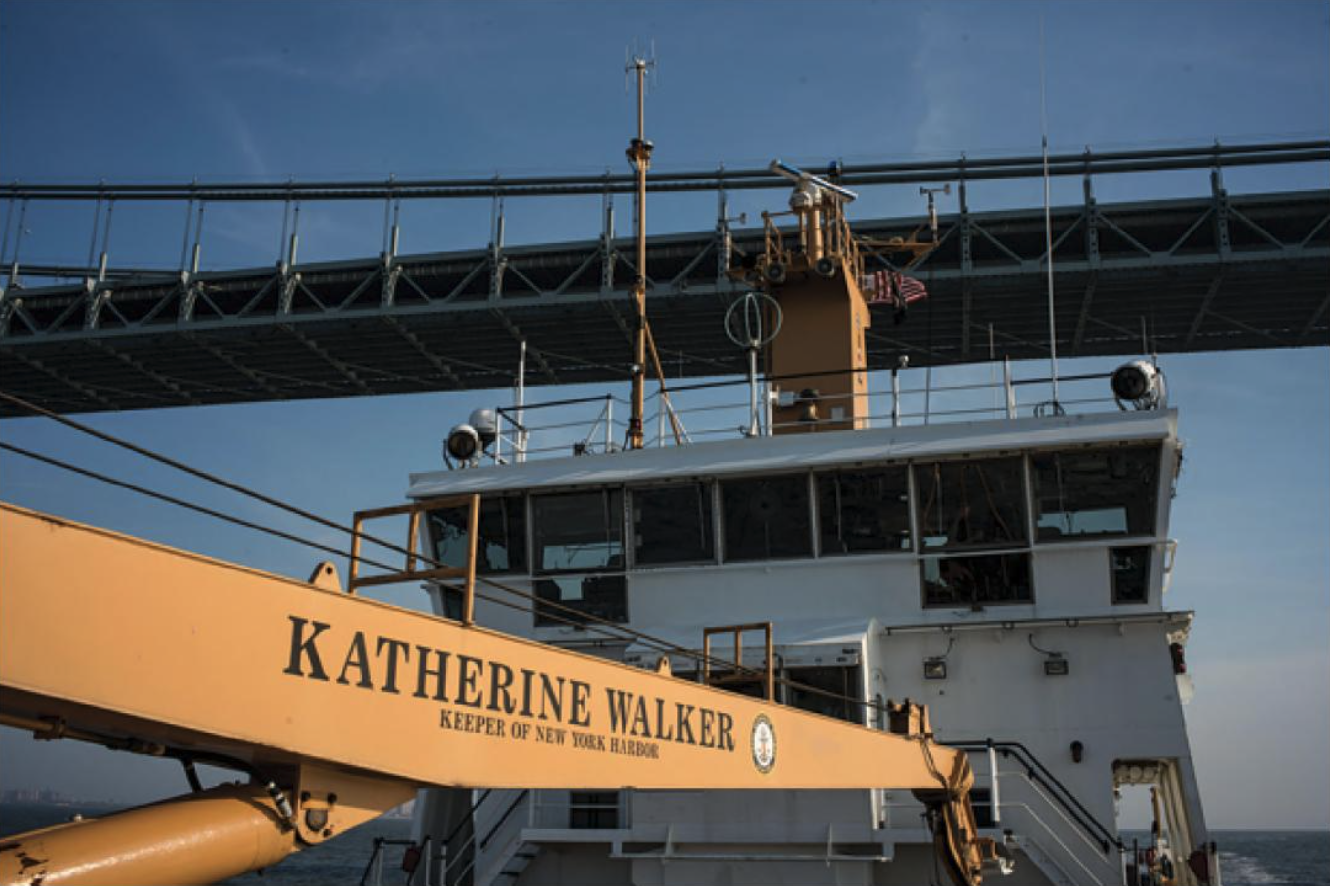
Katherine Walker passing under the Verrazzano–Narrows Bridge

After acceptance by the Coast Guard, Katherine Walker sailed from Lake Michigan, through the Great Lakes, and out into the Atlantic to reach her home port in Bayonne on 14 August 1997. She was placed in commission at a ceremony there on 1 November 1997 which was attended by Deputy Secretary of the Department of Transportation, Mortimer L. Downey, and his wife, Joyce, the sponsor of the ship. Also in attendance was Vice Admiral Richard D. Herr, Vice-Commandant of the Coast Guard.

Katherine Walker's buoy tending involves lifting them onto her deck where marine growth is scraped and pressure washed off, inspecting the buoy itself, and replacing lights, solar cells, and radar transponders. The mooring chain or synthetic cable is inspected and replaced as needed. The concrete block mooring anchor is also inspected. Since ice can damage buoys or drag them out of position, Katherine Walker switches larger summer buoys with smaller winter marks and then back again seasonally in the Hudson River.

The bulk of Katherine Walker's year is spent at sea tending its buoys, or in port maintaining the ship. She has been asked to perform other missions, as described below.

=== Security and disaster recovery ===
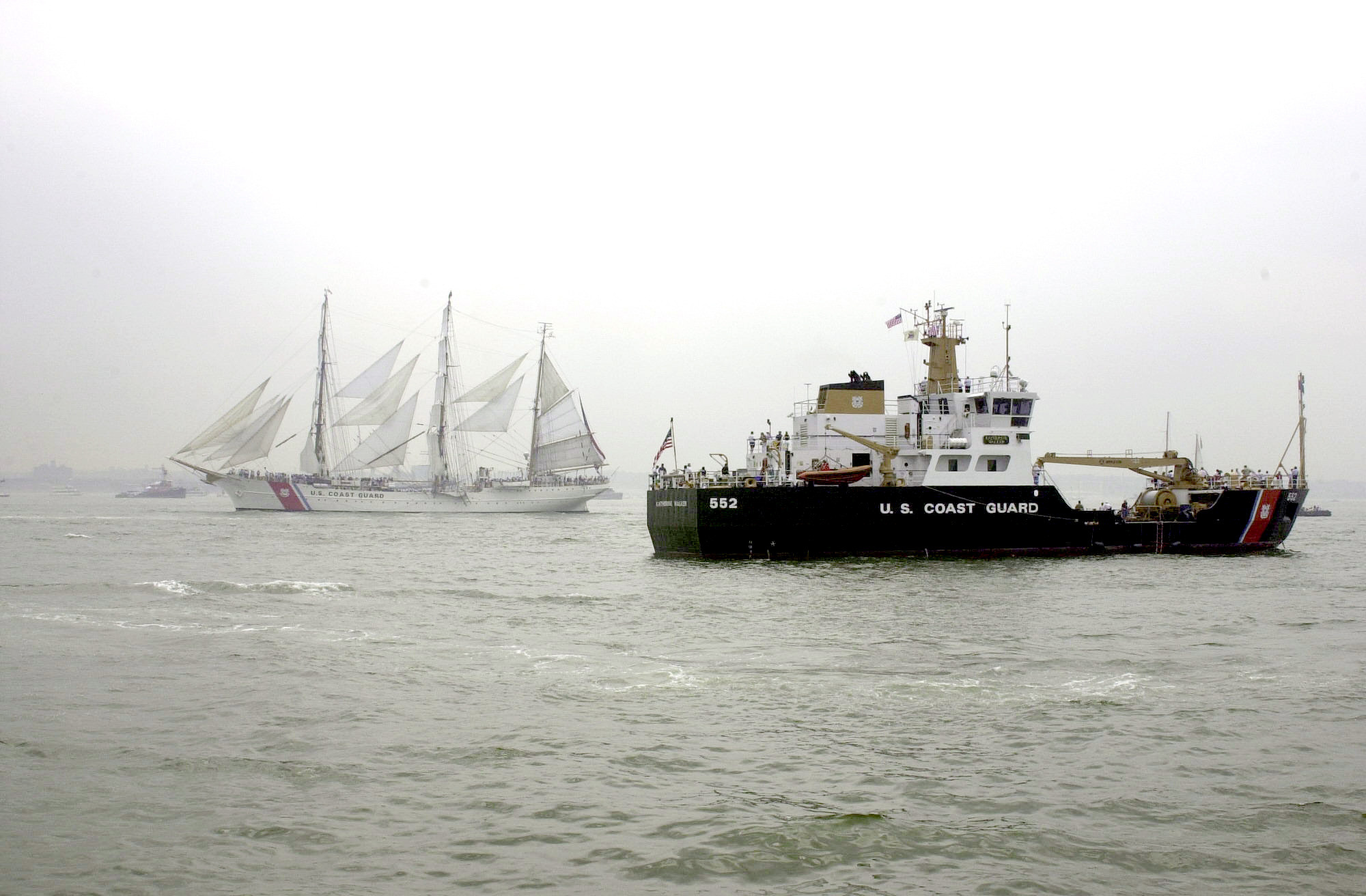
Katherine Walker providing security for the parade of ships led by USCGC Eagle at OpSail 2000

In July 2000, Katherine Walker provided security for the parade of tall ships in New York Harbor during OpSail 2000.

On September 11, 2001, the crew of the USCGS Katherine Walker participated in the maritime evacuation of Lower Manhattan. By 24 September 2001, Katherine Walker was stationed offshore from the World Trade Center attack site and was moving cargo from other boats to a pier in lower Manhattan. The ship was honored with the Department of Transportation Outstanding Unit Award for her efforts.

Katherine Walker is one of the main Coast Guard platforms to provide security on the East River when the United Nations General Assembly is in session at the United Nations headquarters. She has exercised evacuating the area in the event of an emergency.

=== Marine environmental protection ===
On April 4, 2017, the USCGS Katherine Walker responded to a potential environmental disaster on the Hudson River, near Catskill, New York, where a barge ran aground carrying 60,000 barrels of gasoline. A safety zone was established on the river in the vicinity of the vessel. Inspection revealed that the barge's tanks had not been punctured and there was no leakage as a result of the accident.

=== Ice breaking ===
There are a number of small passenger-only ferries that transport commuters around the New York area. Katherine Walker has cleared channels of light ice for these vessels.

=== Public outreach ===
The Coast Guard has offered public tours of Katherine Walker on several occasions. These include:

In Green Bay, Wisconsin in July 1997

At Coast Guard Station New London in August 1997 as the ship was transiting to her new home port

New York Fleet Week in 1998, 2004, 2005, 2007, 2008, 2009, 2010, 2011, 2014, 2017, 2018,

At the U.S. Lighthouse Depot on Staten Island in October 1998

At Coast Guard Appreciation Day on Manhattan in July 1999
