= Katherine Walker =

German-American lighthouse keeper

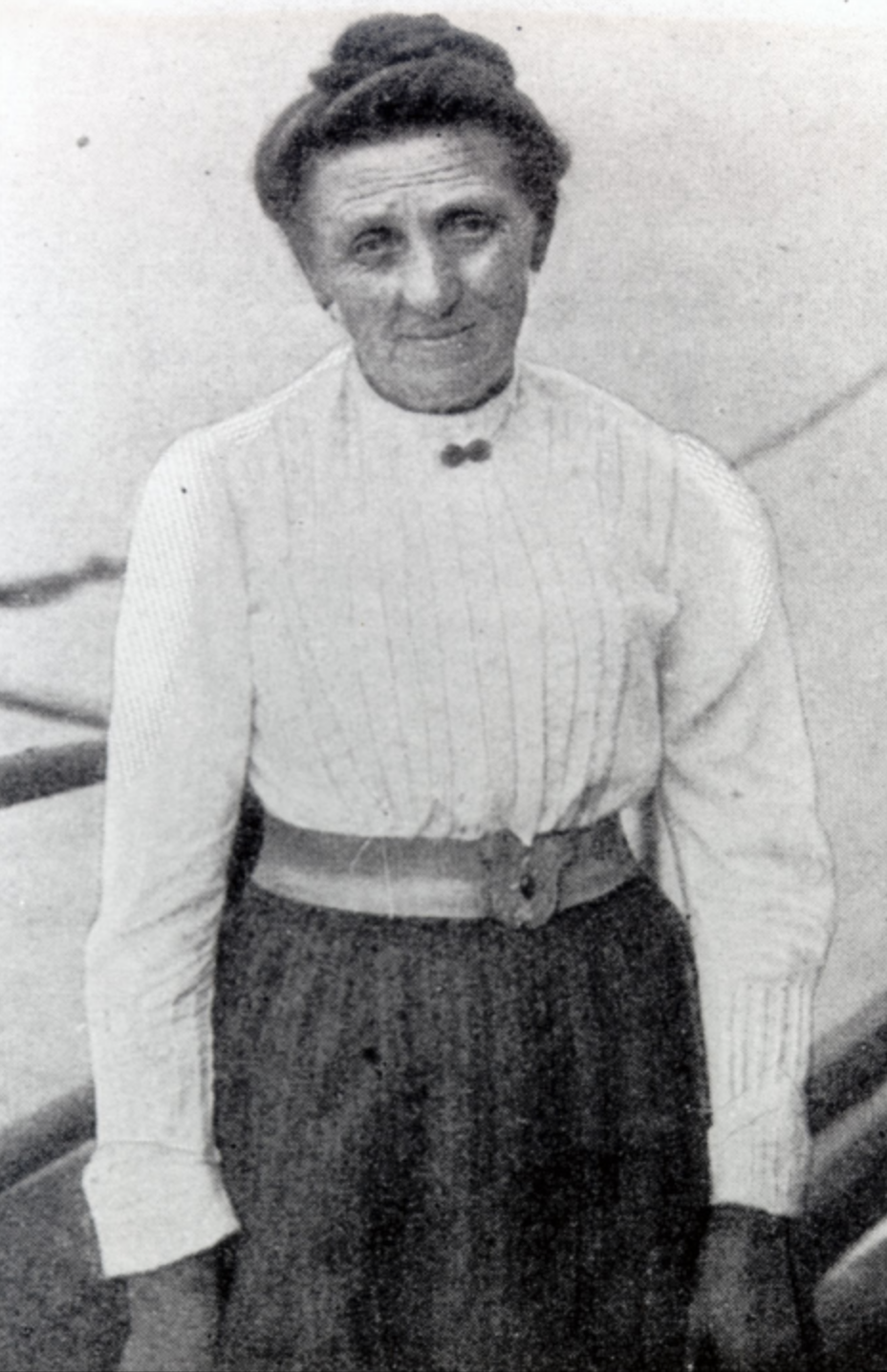
Walker, c. 1909

Katherine Walker (née Katharina Görtler; November 25, 1848 – February 5, 1931) was a German-American lighthouse keeper.

Walker tended the Robbins Reef Light in New York Harbor for more than 30 years after the death of her husband, Captain John Walker, who had been appointed keeper of the light in 1885. Katherine Walker was appointed the official keeper of the light by President Benjamin Harrison in 1890, four years after her husband's death. During her tenure she rescued 50 or more sailors from shipwrecks.

== Early life ==
Walker was born in Rumbach, Germany, to Friedrich and Susanna Görtler. She married Joseph Kaird and they had a son, Jacob, in 1875, but Kaird died shortly after. In 1882, the widow and her young son immigrated to the United States.

== Sandy Hook ==
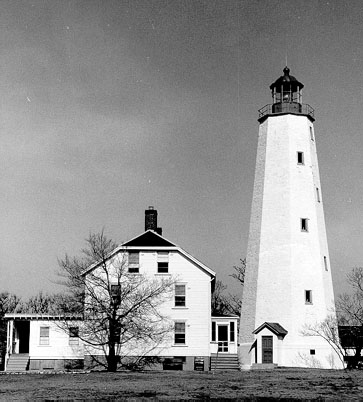
Sandy Hook Light

Walker settled in Sandy Hook, New Jersey, where she got a job as a cook in a boarding house. There she met Captain John Walker, a retired sea captain who was the keeper of the Sandy Hook Light. He offered to give Katherine English lessons, though his own English was not perfect. In 1884, the couple married, and settled into their new home in the Sandy Hook lighthouse. She quickly learned how to assist her husband with his duties, but in 1885 Captain Walker was transferred to Robbins Reef Light. Shortly after, Katherine gave birth to their daughter, Mary.

== Robbins Reef Light ==
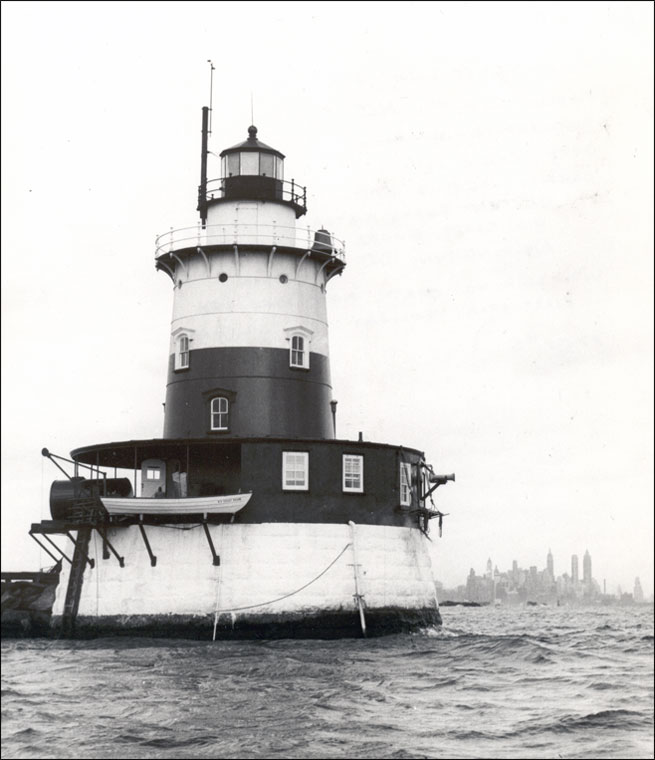
Robbins Reef Light Station, c. 1951

Sandy Hook Light was land-based, which allowed Walker to have a garden and plant vegetables. Such a garden would not be possible at Robbins Reef as the structure was surrounded by water, a fact that made Walker threaten to leave her husband. Later in life she told a visitor to the lighthouse of her first impression of her future home: "When I first came to Robbins Reef, the sight of the water, whichever way I looked, made me lonesome. I refused to unpack my trunks at first, but gradually, a little at a time, I unpacked. After a while they were all unpacked and I stayed on." Walker ultimately stayed on for 33 years after her husband's death from pneumonia in 1886. Captain Walker's last words to his wife, "Mind the light, Kate," motivated her to continue as the keeper at Robbins Reef. They were words Kate had often heard from her husband, and she intended to abide by them.

Although Walker had been working for $350 in annual wages as assistant keeper while her husband was alive and had proven herself capable of the required work, it was four years, after multiple men had declined the job, before she was officially offered the keeper position for $600 a year. Once a year, a lighthouse official would stop by the lighthouse to drop off a few tons of coal, barrels of oil, and an envelope containing her wages. Aside from this visit, Walker was left alone. Now comfortable with her life offshore, she became uncomfortable with trips to the mainland. She rarely left the station except to row her children back and forth to school on Staten Island. Of New York City, Walker once said, "I am in fear from the time I leave the ferryboat. The street cars bewilder me, and I am afraid of automobiles. Why, a fortune wouldn't tempt me to get into one of those things!"

== Tending the light ==
In 1906, Walker was interviewed by The New York Times at Robbins Reef and explained that becoming truly lonesome was impossible as there was too much work to be done. The light was to be lit each night immediately following the gunfire from Governors Island that signaled sunset. Until dawn, the light would shine every six seconds and on a clear night it could be seen twelve miles away. If the night was foggy, Walker would descend into her basement where she would start an engine that would send out loud siren blasts at three second intervals. Walker and her assistant keeper, her son Jacob, would not attempt sleep on foggy nights. If the siren were to malfunction, Walker would ascend to the top of the tower and manually hammer on a bell. This hammering was a signal to the mainland that the siren was in need of repair, and officials would make the trip as soon as the weather permitted. She also had to keep detailed notes regarding her duties to submit to the government each month. To The New York Times, Walker described the light as "more difficult to care for than a family of children." Although the lamp only needed to be wound every five hours to maintain the light, Walker took measures to wind it every three hours. Her efforts ensured that the "light never disappointed sailors who have depended on it."

== Life offshore ==
Aside from "minding the light", Walker had hours of housework each day. She exclaimed to the New York Times reporter in 1906 that there was "as much housework to do here as at the Waldorf Astoria!" Walker turned the small three-story lighthouse into a comfortable home. The reporter wrote that casual passersby would be surprised to learn "that it has five large rooms quite as commodious as they would expect to find in a forty-dollar-a-month flat!" Walker's daughter, Mary, was her primary companion at the lighthouse for the majority of her childhood; her brother Jacob spent most of his time on the mainland as his mother's postman and general courier. Jacob did continue to make daily trips out to the station to help his mother tend to the light. Mary eventually spent more time on Staten Island as well, as she boarded with a family there once it was time to go to school, only returning to visit on weekends and holidays.

== Retirement ==
In 1919, at the age of 71, Walker reluctantly retired as the Robbins Reef keeper, as required by a federal law passed the previous year. Her son Jacob took over as keeper. In her thirty-three years at the lighthouse, Walker saw the progression from kerosene lamps to oil vapor lamps and eventually to electricity. Minding the light became much easier. After her retirement, Walker lived in a small cottage with a garden on Staten Island where she was frequently spotted observing Robbins Reef.

== Death ==
Walker died on February 5, 1931, and her obituary in the New York Evening Post contained this passage: "A great city's water front is rich in romance... There are queenly liners, the grim battle craft, the countless carriers of commerce that pass in endless procession. And amid all this and in the sight of the city of towers and the torch of liberty lived this sturdy little woman, proud of her work and content in it, keeping her lamp alight and her windows clean, so that New York Harbor might be safe for ships that pass in the night." She is interred in Ocean View Cemetery.

== Legacy ==
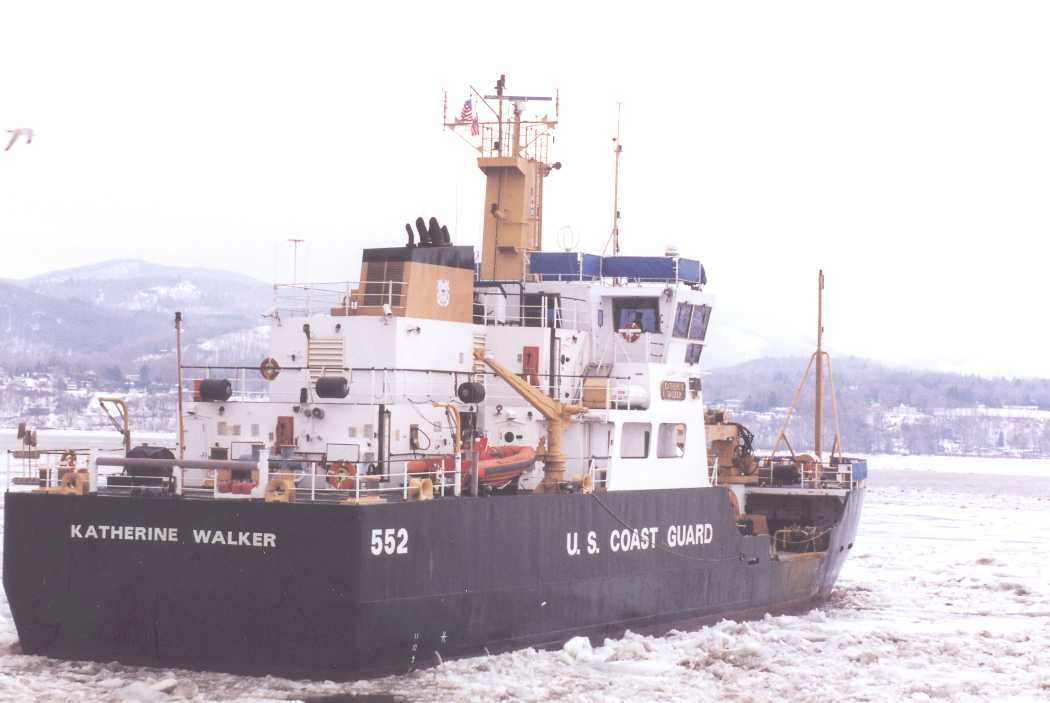
USCGC Katherine Walker, the United States Coast Guard coastal buoy tender named after Walker.

A United States Coast Guard coastal buoy tender is named for her.

In 2009, the government declared Robbins Reef Light "surplus property", and although the Bayonne Economic Development Corporation expressed interest in the structure, only the Noble Maritime Collection submitted a proposal. The museum was granted stewardship in 2011 by the U.S. General Services Administration. The Noble Collection has plans to restore the lighthouse. Eventually, Robbins Reef will be turned into a museum to educate people about Walker and her life as a lighthouse keeper.

In 2019, SheBuiltNYC a New York City effort which was created to honor the achievements of female leaders and to increase the amount of statues in the city that are of women (currently there are 150 statues, and only 5 are of women), announced that a statue of Walker will be erected at St. George Terminal of the Staten Island Ferry, in Staten Island.
