= Robbins Reef Light =

Lighthouse in Bayonne, New Jersey

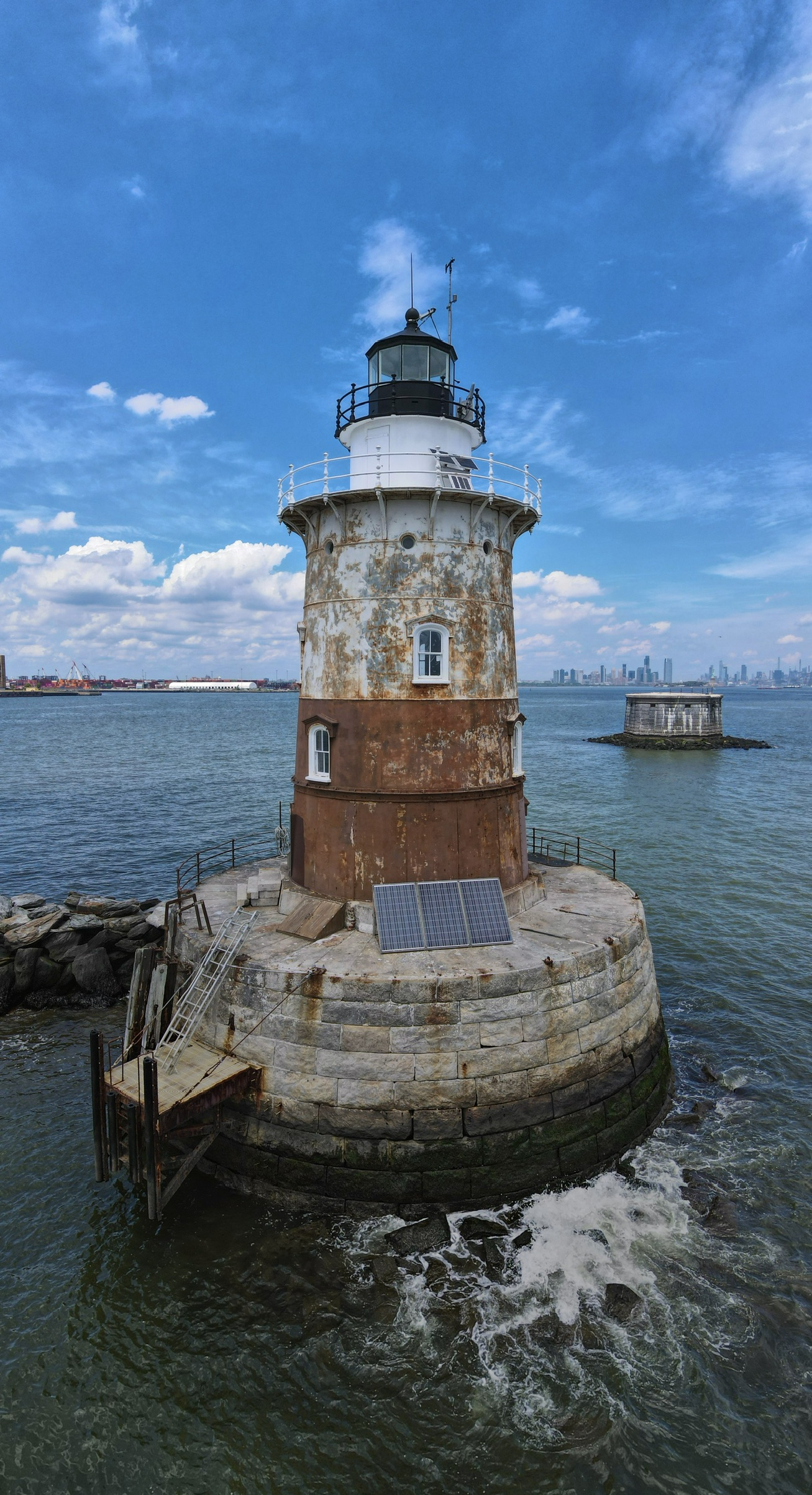
- Location: SW Upper New York Bay, 2.6 mi. SE of I-78 Interchange 14A, Bayonne, New Jersey
- Coordinates: 40°39′26.512″N 74°3′55.277″W

Tower
- Constructed: 1839
- Foundation: Granite caisson
- Construction: Brick / Cast iron
- Automated: 1966
- Height: 45 feet (14 m)
- Shape: Conical
- Markings: Lower half: brown upper half: white lantern: black
- Heritage: National Register of Historic Places listed place

Light
- First lit: 1883 (current structure)
- Focal height: 56 feet (17 m)
- Lens: 4th order Fresnel lens (original), 12 inches (300 mm) (current)
- Range: 7 nautical miles (13 km; 8.1 mi)
- Characteristic: Flashing Green, 6s
- Robbins Reef Light Station
- U.S. National Register of Historic Places
- Architect: U.S. Lighthouse Board
- MPS: Light Stations of the United States MPS
- NRHP reference No.: 06000631
- Added to NRHP: July 19, 2006

The Robbins Reef Light Station is a sparkplug lighthouse located off Constable Hook in Bayonne, Hudson County, New Jersey, United States, along the west side of Main Channel, Upper New York Bay. The tower and integral keepers quarters were built in 1883. It replaced an octagonal granite tower built in 1839. The U.S. Coast Guard owned and operated the light station until the 2000s.

== Position ==
The light is located on a small ridge of sand named Robyn's Rift by the Dutch settlers of the area. The reef is now called Robbins Reef. It is situated near the entrance to the Kill van Kull, a strait connecting New York Bay to Newark Bay. The channel is one of the most heavily used in the Port of New York and New Jersey, accessing Port Newark-Elizabeth Marine Terminal.

== History ==
The name derives from the New Netherland era of the 17th century. In Dutch rob or robyn means seal, groups of which would sometimes lie on the reef at low tide. The structure is also called Kate's Light for Kate Walker who operated the station alone after the death of her husband Captain John Walker in 1886, until 1919. She rowed her children to school in Bayonne. Herman Westgate was the last keeper of the lighthouse before it was finally automated. In 2009 Robbins Reef was put up for sale under the National Historic Lighthouse Preservation Act. In 2011, the Noble Maritime Collection, a maritime museum on Staten Island, was granted stewardship of the light station by the U.S. General Services Administration.

== Recent developments ==
In 2011, ownership was transferred to the Noble Maritime Collection based at Sailors' Snug Harbor in Staten Island, through the terms of the National Historic Lighthouse Preservation Act. Recently museum volunteers have been restoring the lighthouse, with the interior restoration nearly complete. Miller’s Launch, a local launch tug, and spill response team provides periodic transportation for the volunteers. Total renovations are expected to be complete in the early 2020s, at which time the lighthouse will offer tours and even serve as a bed and breakfast.

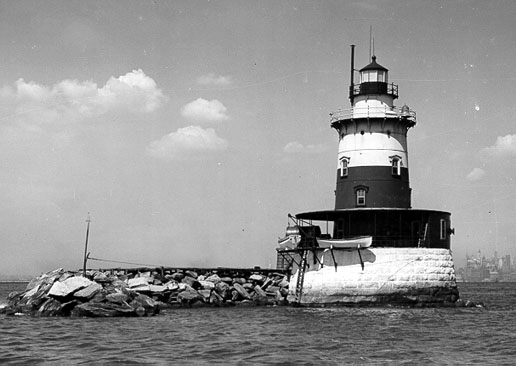
U.S. Coast Guard Photo from about 1950 with station boat

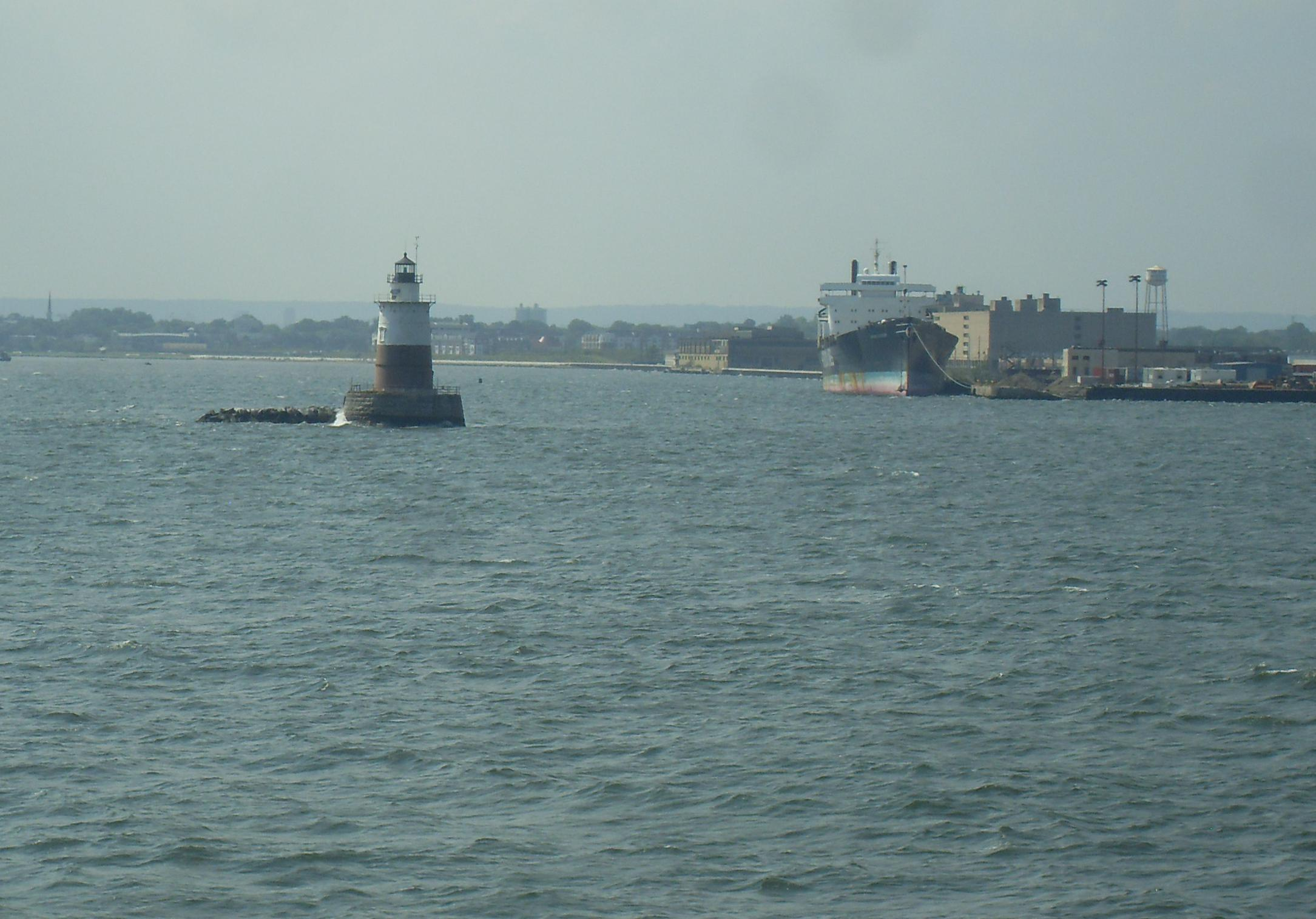
Lighthouse from Staten Island Ferry

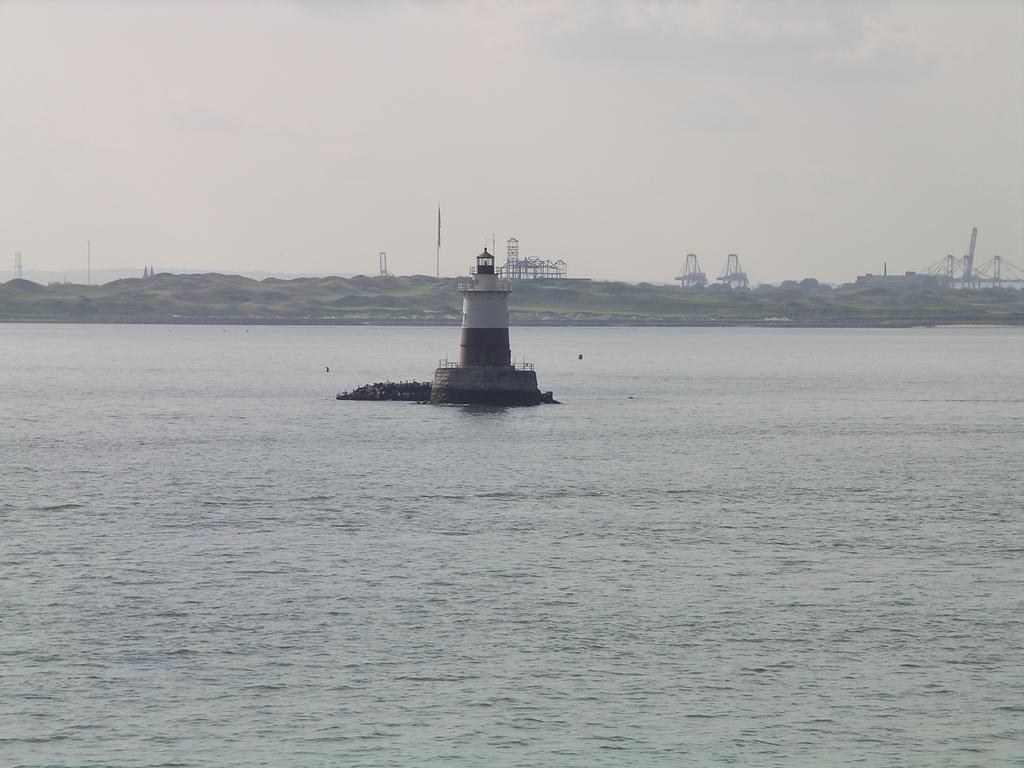
In 2006

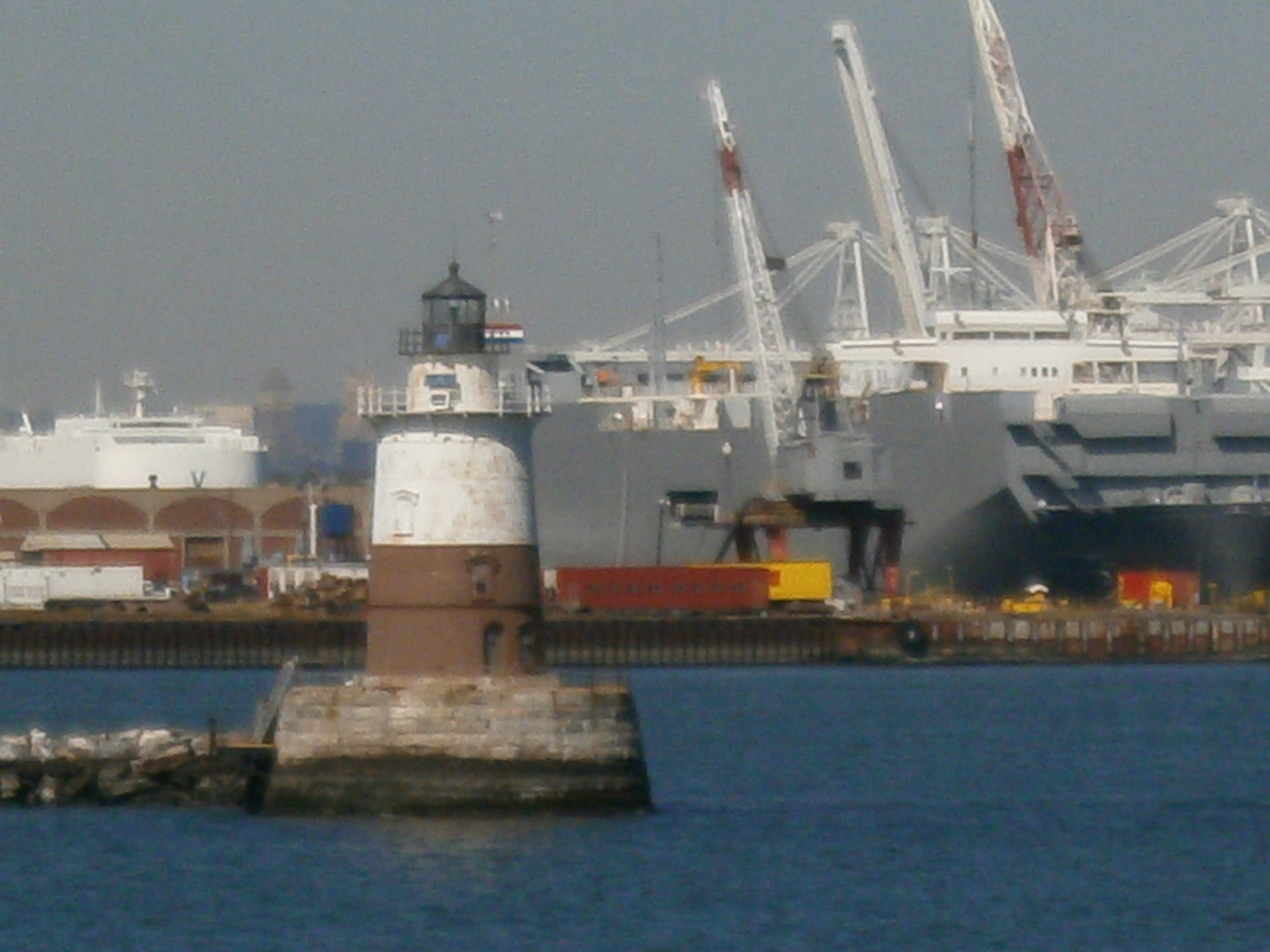
View northwest to Military Ocean Terminal at Bayonne and Port Jersey

== See also ==
- National Register of Historic Places listings in Hudson County, New Jersey
- Geography of New York-New Jersey Harbor Estuary
