= Grasp (disambiguation) =

A grasp generally refers to an act of taking, holding or seizing firmly with (or as if with) the hand.

Grasp or GRASP may also refer to:

== Computing ==
- Graphics Animation System for Professionals (GRASP), the first multimedia animation/authoring software for the IBM PC
- Grasp (spooler), a spooler for DOS and DOS/VSE
- GRASP (object-oriented design), General Responsibility Assignment Software Patterns (or Principles)
- GRASP, the previous version of Jgrasp, a graphical source code editor
- General Purpose Relativistic Atomic Structure Program, developed by Ian Grant and others for relativistic atomic structure calculations
- GRASP (SAT solver), an SAT instance solver
- Greedy randomized adaptive search procedure

== Ships ==
- USS Grasp, two ships of the United States Navy named Grasp
- USNS Grasp, a United States Navy rescue and salvage ship

== Other uses ==
- Glaciogenic Reservoir Analogue Studies Project, a collaborative project in glacially-related sedimentary systems
- Grace St. Paul's Episcopal Church or GraSP Church, an Episcopal church in Trenton, New Jersey, United States
- Great Apes Survival Project

== See also ==
- Grab (disambiguation)
