= Grab =

Grab may refer to:

== Places ==
=== Bosnia and Herzegovina ===
- Grab, Ljubuški
- Grab, Trebinje
- Grab, Trnovo

=== Croatia ===
- Grab, Split-Dalmatia County, a village near Trilj
- Grab (river), a river near Grab, Split-Dalmatia County
- Grab, Zadar County, a village near Gračac

=== Kosovo ===
- Grab (peak)

=== Montenegro ===
- Grab, Bijelo Polje

=== Poland ===
- Grab, Kalisz County, Greater Poland Voivodeship
- Grab, Pleszew County, Greater Poland Voivodeship
- Grab, Subcarpathian Voivodeship, Poland

=== Serbia ===
- Grab, Lučani

=== United States ===
- Grab, Kentucky

== People ==
- Grab (surname), a list of people
- Grab (ispán), Hungarian official in the 11th century

== Technology ==
- Grab Holdings, a multinational technology company, super-app developer
- Grab (macOS), a screenshot application
- Grab (tool), a mechanical device
- Galactic Radiation and Background, or GRAB, a series of electronic signals intelligence satellites operated by the U.S. Naval Research Laboratory

== Other uses ==
- Grab (ship), a two- or three-masted vessel used on the Malabar Coast

== See also ==
- Grabs (disambiguation)
- Grasp (disambiguation)
- Snatch (disambiguation)
