= Naval Inactive Ship Maintenance Facility =

U.S. Navy storage site for decommissioned vessels

A Naval Inactive Ship Maintenance Facility (NISMF) is a facility owned by the United States Navy as a holding facility for decommissioned naval vessels, pending determination of their final fate. All ships in these facilities are inactive, but some are still on the Naval Vessel Register (NVR), while others have been stricken from the register.

The ships that have been stricken from the NVR are disposed of by one of several means, including foreign military sales transfer, ship donation as a museum or memorial, domestic dismantling and recycling, artificial reefing, or use as a target vessel. Others are retention assets for possible future reactivation, which have been laid up for long-term preservation and are maintained with minimal maintenance (humidity control, corrosion control, flood/fire watch) should they need to be recalled to active duty.

The Navy has been reducing the number of inactive ships, which numbered as many as 195 in 1997, but was down to 49 by the end of 2014.

The Naval Sea Systems Command's Inactive Ships Management Office (INACTSHIPOFF) is based in Portsmouth, Virginia.

There are three NISMFs:

- Puget Sound Naval Shipyard – Bremerton, Washington
- Joint Base Pearl Harbor–Hickam – Pearl Harbor, Hawaii
- Philadelphia Naval Shipyard – Philadelphia, Pennsylvania

In addition, parts of the Norfolk Naval Shipyard, Portsmouth, Virginia, South Gate Annex Naval Inactive Ship Maintenance Facility and Puget Sound Naval Shipyard are designated for the storage of inactive nuclear powered vessels.

Inactive ship facilities in Suisun Bay, James River and Beaumont, Texas are owned and operated by the Maritime Administration under the U.S. Department of Transportation.

== Vessels moored at NISMFs ==
Following is a list of vessels currently being stored at the facilities as of 30 July 2026.

=== Philadelphia, Pennsylvania ===
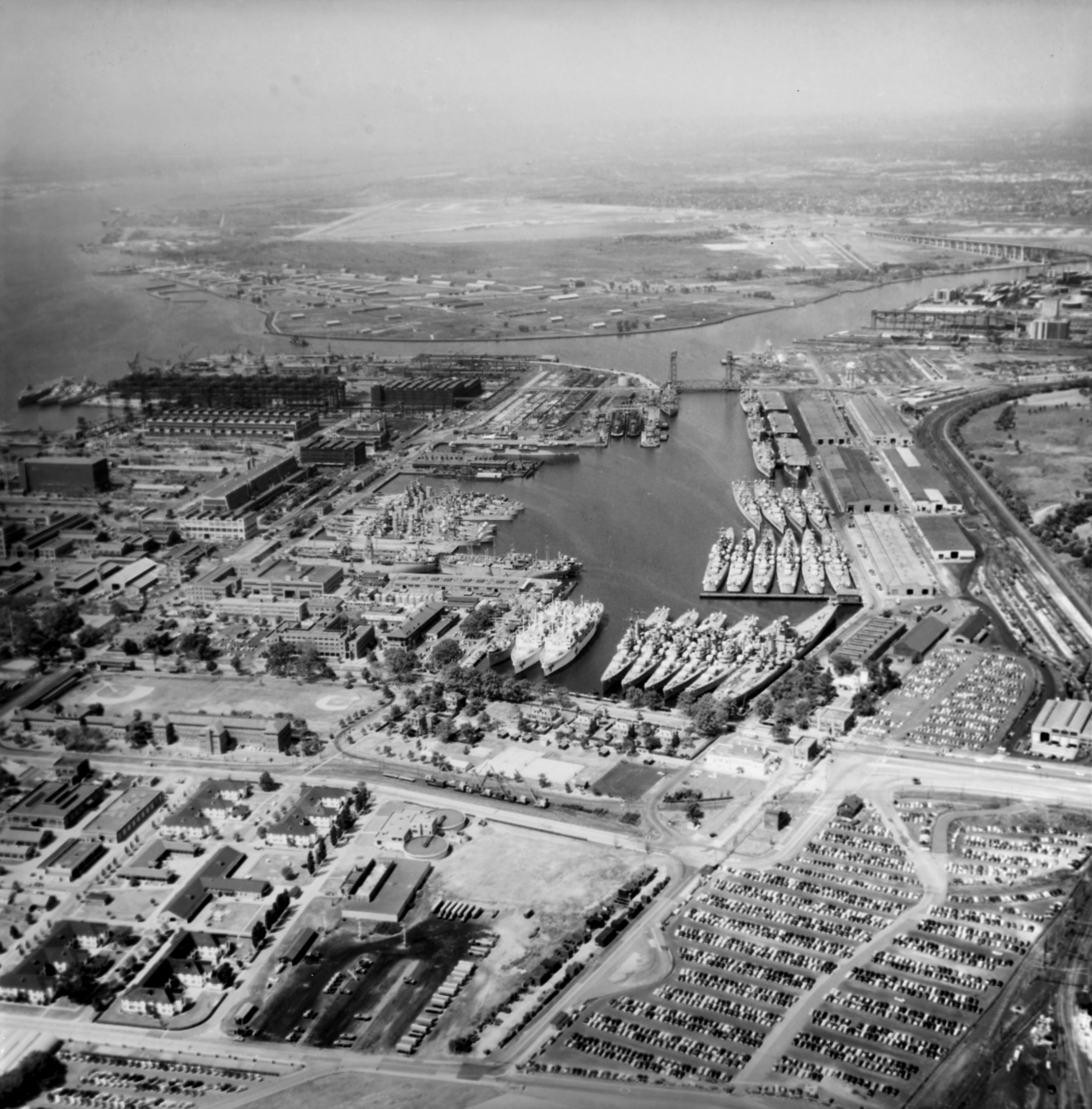
Philadelphia NISMF in 1955

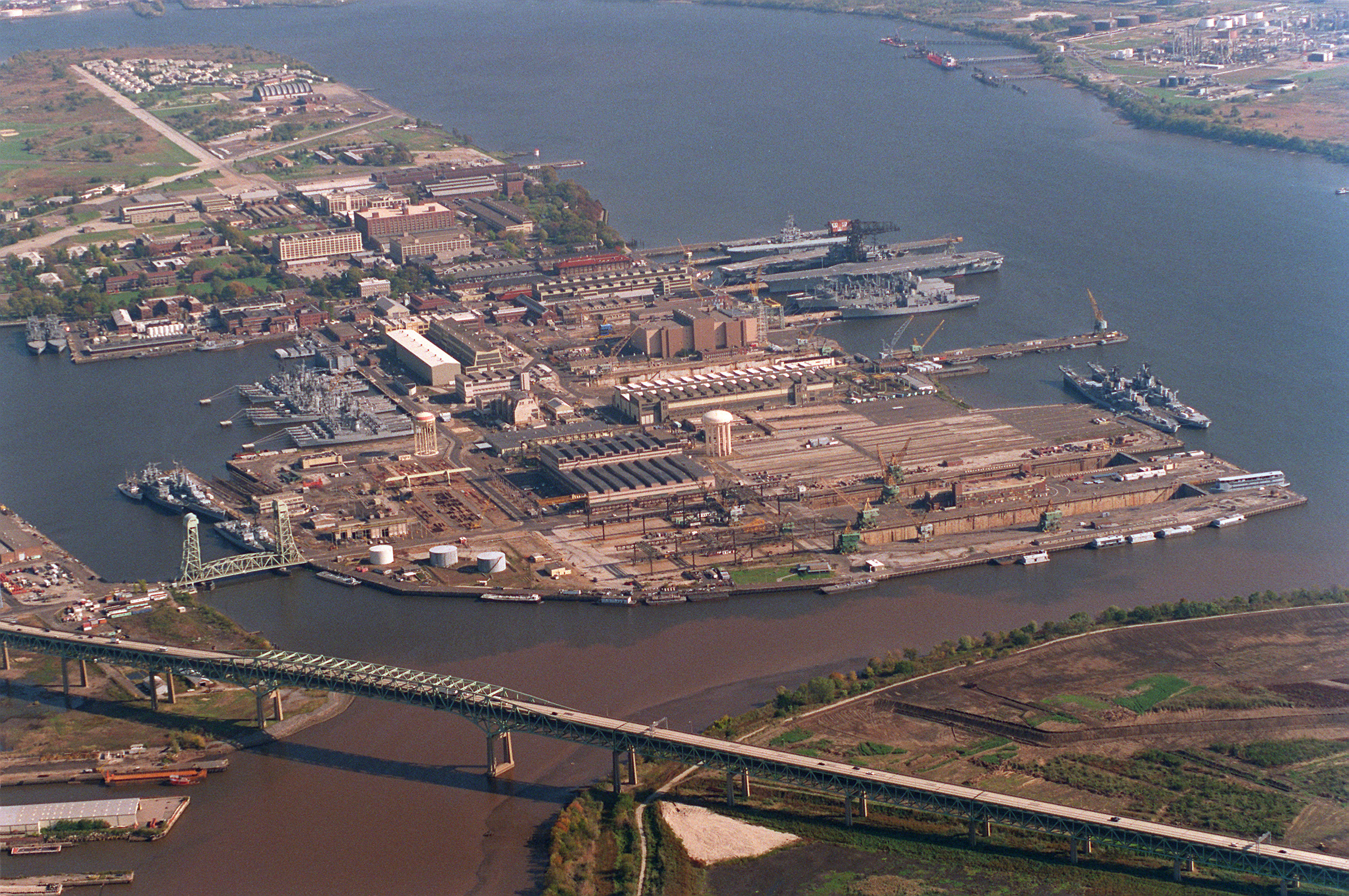
Philadelphia NISMF in 1995

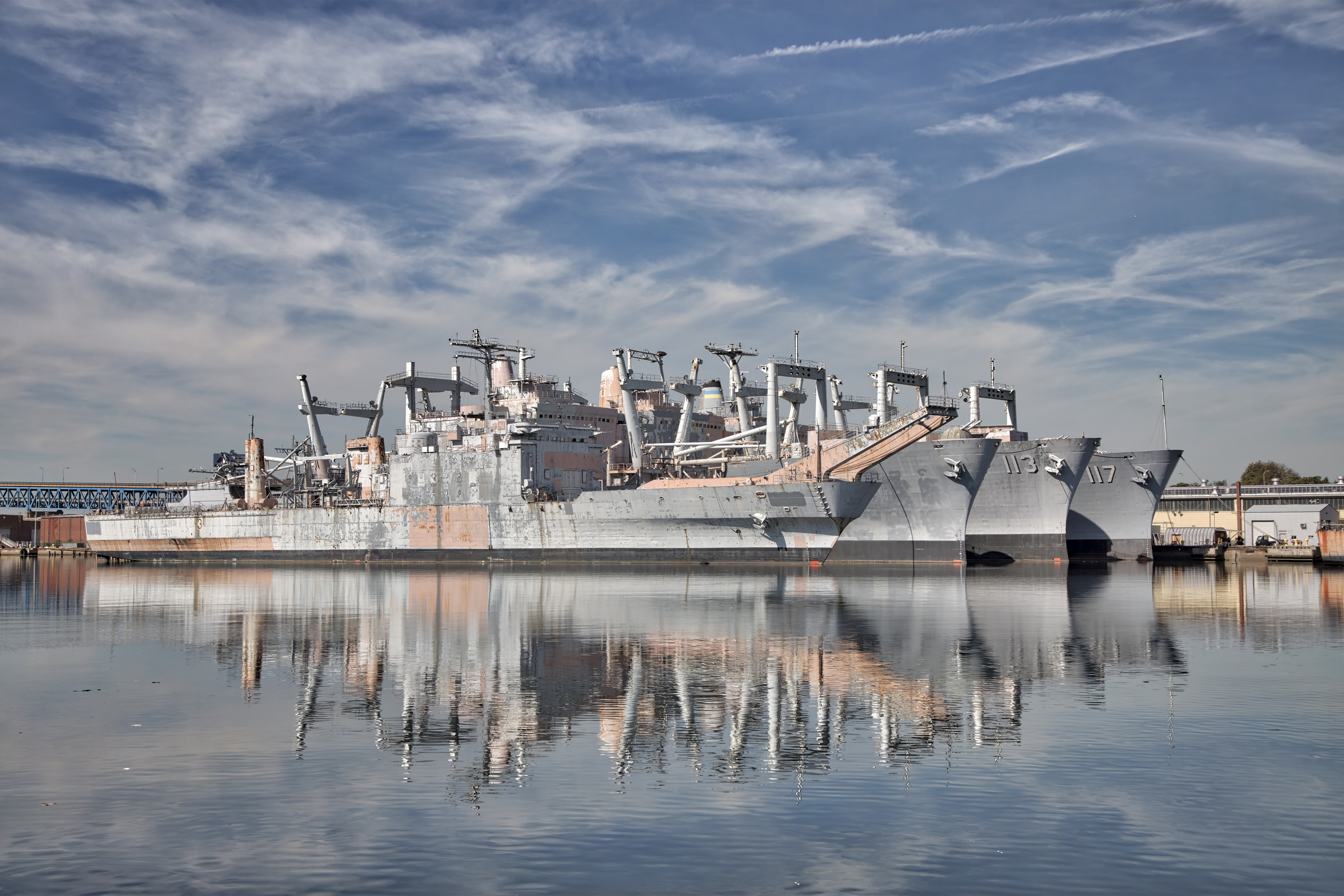
Ships laid up at Philadelphia NISMF in 2017.

Ship	Class	Type	Status
USS Anzio (CG-68)	Ticonderoga	Cruiser	Stricken, final disposition pending.
USNS Apache (T-ATF-172)	Powhatan	Fleet Ocean Tug	Stricken, final disposition pending.
USS Canon (PG-90)	Asheville	Gunboat	Stricken, final disposition pending.
USS Carr (FFG-52)	Oliver Hazard Perry	Frigate	Stricken, final disposition pending.
USS De Wert (FFG-45)	Oliver Hazard Perry	Frigate	Stricken, final disposition pending.
USS Detroit (LCS-7)	Freedom	Littoral Combat Ship	Out of commission, in reserve.
USS Elrod (FFG-55)	Oliver Hazard Perry	Frigate	Stricken, final disposition pending.
USNS Grapple (T-ARS-53)	Safeguard	Salvage Ship	Out of service, in reserve.
USS Halyburton (FFG-40)	Oliver Hazard Perry	Frigate	Stricken, final disposition pending. (possibly on hold for donation)
USS Hué City (CG-66)	Ticonderoga	Cruiser	Stricken, final disposition pending.
USS Kauffman (FFG-59)	Oliver Hazard Perry	Frigate	Stricken, final disposition pending.
USS Leyte Gulf (CG-55)	Ticonderoga	Cruiser	Out of commission, in reserve.
USS Little Rock (LCS-9)	Freedom	Littoral Combat Ship	Out of commission, in reserve.
USS Milwaukee (LCS-5)	Freedom	Littoral Combat Ship	Stricken, final disposition pending.
USS Monterey (CG-61)	Ticonderoga	Cruiser	Stricken, final disposition pending.
USS Normandy (CG-60)	Ticonderoga	Cruiser	Stricken, final disposition pending.
USS Philippine Sea (CG-58)	Ticonderoga	Cruiser	Stricken, final disposition pending.
USS San Jacinto (CG-56)	Ticonderoga	Cruiser	Stricken, final disposition pending.
USS Sioux City (LCS-11)	Freedom	Littoral Combat Ship	Out of commission, in reserve.
USS Tornado (PC-14)	Cyclone	Patrol Ship	Stricken, final disposition pending.
USS Vella Gulf (CG-72)	Ticonderoga	Cruiser	Stricken, final disposition pending.

=== Bremerton, Washington ===
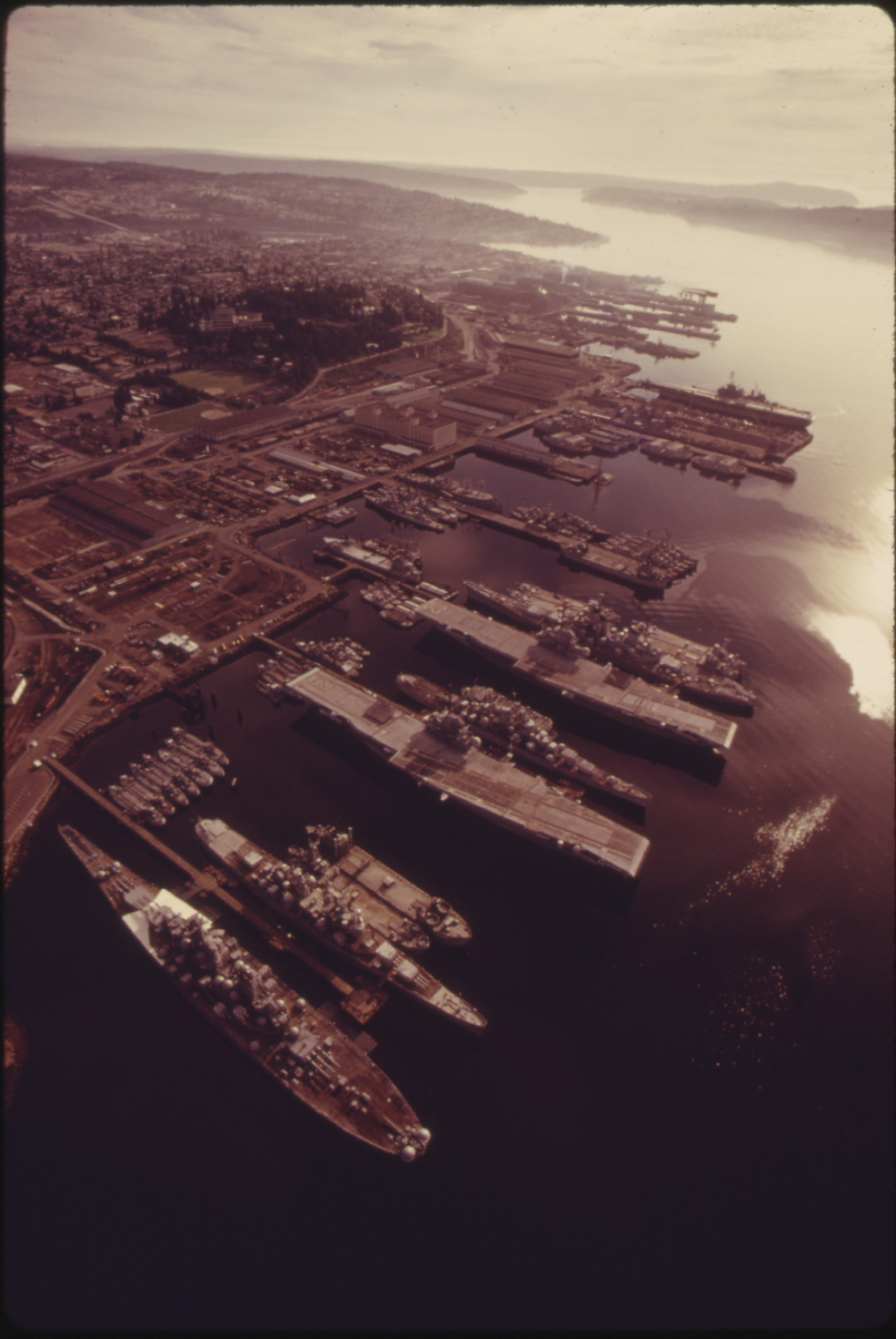
The mothball fleet at Bremerton, Washington, in 1974

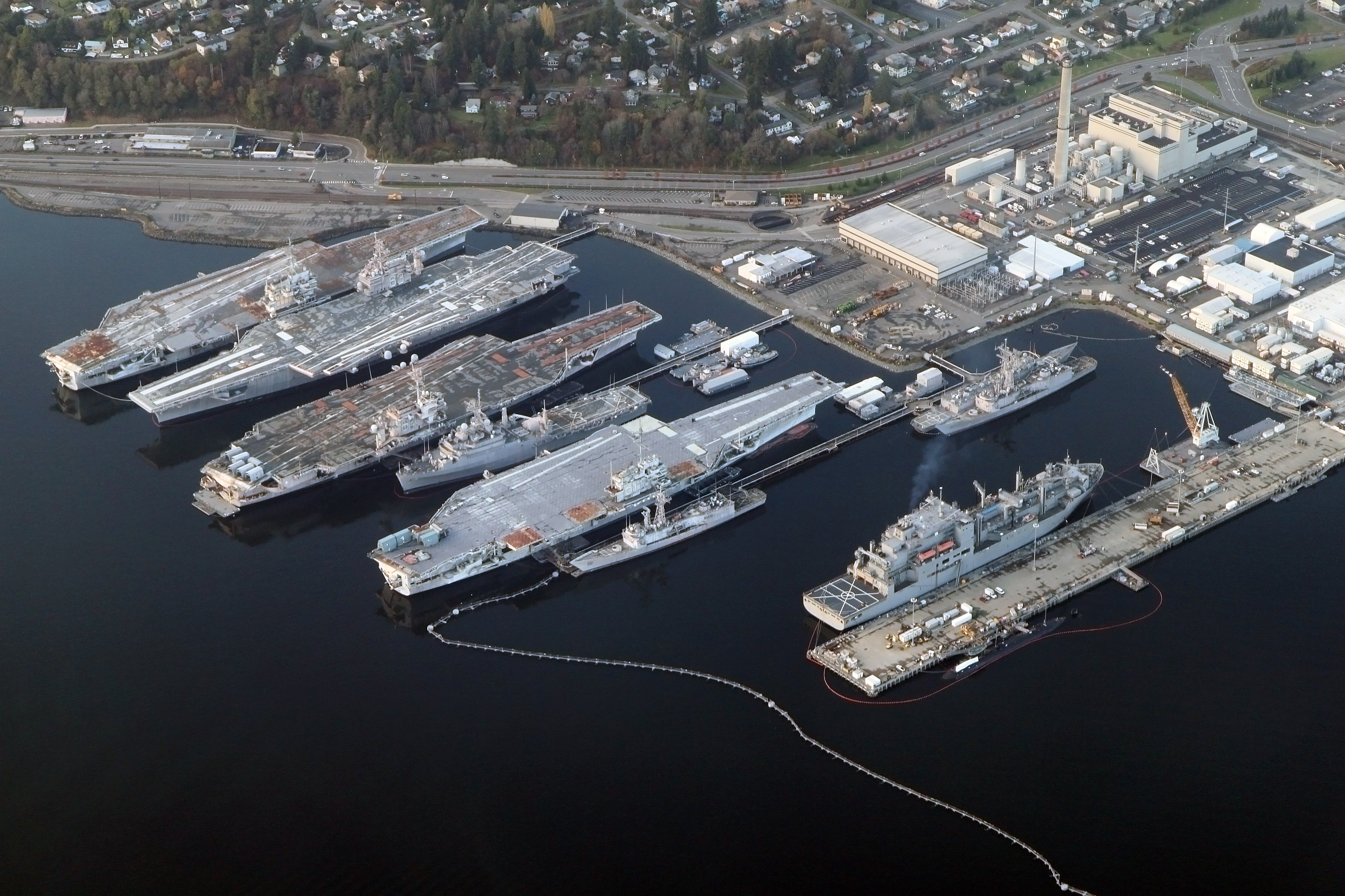
Aircraft carriers stored at the NISMF in Bremerton, 2012. From left to right: Independence, Kitty Hawk, Constellation and Ranger.

Ship	Class	Type	Status
USNS Bridge (T-AOE-10)	Supply	Fast Combat Support Ship	Stricken, final disposition pending.
USS Bunker Hill (CG-52)	Ticonderoga	Cruiser	Stricken, final disposition pending.
USS Coronado (LCS-4)	Independence	Littoral Combat Ship	Out of commission, in reserve.
USS Freedom (LCS-1)	Freedom	Littoral Combat Ship	Stricken, final disposition pending.
USS Independence (LCS-2)	Independence	Littoral Combat Ship	Stricken, final disposition pending.
USS Lake Champlain (CG-57)	Ticonderoga	Cruiser	Stricken, final disposition pending.
USS Long Beach (CGN-9)	Long Beach	Cruiser	Stricken, final disposition pending.
USNS Rainier (T-AOE-7)	Supply	Fast Combat Support Ship	Stricken, final disposition pending.

=== Pearl Harbor, Hawaii ===
Ship	Class	Type	Status
USS Antietam (CG-54)	Ticonderoga	Cruiser	Stricken, final disposition pending.
USS Cowpens (CG-63)	Ticonderoga	Cruiser	Stricken, final disposition pending.
USNS Navajo (T-ATF-169)	Powhatan	Fleet Ocean Tug	Stricken, final disposition pending.
USS Port Royal (CG-73)	Ticonderoga	Cruiser	Stricken, final disposition pending.
USNS Safeguard (T-ARS-50)	Safeguard	Salvage Ship	Out of service, in reserve.
USNS Sioux (T-ATF-171)	Powhatan	Fleet Ocean Tug	Stricken, final disposition pending.

== Past Facilities ==
- United States Naval Station Orange, Orange, Texas (1966-1975)
- Naval Inactive Ship Maintenance Facility Bayonne, Bayonne, New Jersey
- NISMF at Naval Base San Diego, San Diego, California

== See also ==
- National Defense Reserve Fleet
- List of current ships of the United States Navy
- List of Military Sealift Command ships
- List of Ready Reserve Force ships
