= Navajo-class rescue and salvage ship =

United States Navy salvage and rescue ship

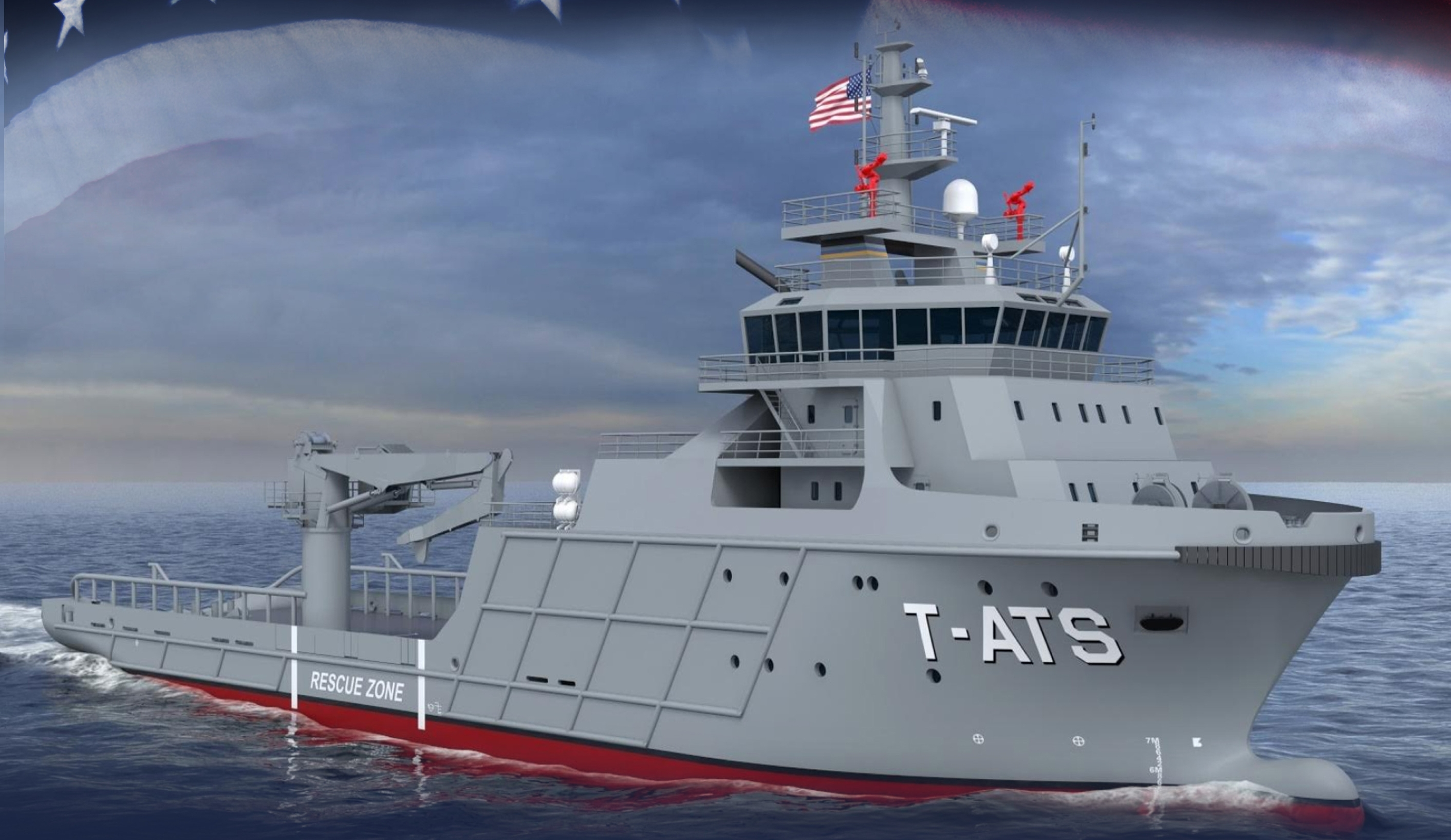
- Graphic representation of a Navajo-class towing, salvage and rescue ship

Class overview
- Name: Navajo class
- Builders: Gulf Island Fabrication
- Operators: United States Navy
- Preceded by: Safeguard class (ARS); Powhatan class (ATF)
- Cost: US$129.9 million
- Planned: 10
- On order: 10
- Building: 6
- Completed: 3
- Active: 1

General characteristics
- Type: Towing, Salvage and Rescue Ship
- Displacement: 5,110 long tons (5,190 t)
- Length: 263 ft (80 m)
- Beam: 59 ft (18 m)
- Draft: 17.7 ft (5.4 m)
- Depth: 24.6 ft (7.5 m)
- Propulsion: Diesel: 2 Wärtsilä 8L32 at 6,308 hp (4,704 kW) each
- Speed: 15.1 knots (28.0 km/h; 17.4 mph)
- Range: 8,170 nmi (15,130 km; 9,400 mi)
- Complement: 65 Total, 23 Crew, 42 Guest

The Navajo class is a class of Towing, Salvage and Rescue Ships for the Military Sealift Command of the United States Navy. They were ordered in 2017 as the planned replacement for the aging Safeguard-class rescue and salvage ships and Powhatan-class tugboats. A total of ten ships of the class have been planned and none have been put in service yet.

== Development ==
Eight ships of the class were planned to replace the aging Safeguard-class rescue and salvage ships and Powhatan-class tugboats. They were ordered in 2017 and on 16 March 2018 Gulf Island Fabrication was chosen to construct them. On 26 March 2020, an additional two ships were ordered by the navy. On 19 April 2021, Gulf Island announced that they had sold the contract along with the shipyard to Bollinger Shipyards.

== Ships in class ==
Navajo-class construction data
Name	Namesake	Hull number	Builder	Laid down	Launched	Status	References
Navajo	Navajo Nation	T-ATS-6	Bollinger Shipyards	30 October 2019	24 May 2023	Completed	
Cherokee Nation	Cherokee Nation	T-ATS-7	Bollinger Shipyards	12 February 2020	9 June 2024	Completed	
Saginaw Ojibwe Anishinabek	Saginaw Chippewa Tribe	T-ATS-8	Bollinger Shipyards	3 October 2022		Under construction	
Lenni Lenape	Lenape Nation	T-ATS-9	Bollinger Shipyards	20 June 2022		Under construction	
Muscogee Creek Nation	Muscogee Nation	T-ATS-10	Bollinger Shipyards	20 March 2024		Under construction	
Billy Frank Jr.	Billy Frank Jr.	T-ATS-11	Austal USA	14 November 2023	14 June 2025	Fitting out	
Solomon Atkinson	Solomon Atkinson	T-ATS-12	Austal USA	16 April 2025	23 Feb 2026	Fitting out	
James D. Fairbanks	James D. Fairbanks	T-ATS-13	Austal USA			Under construction	
Narragansett	Narragansett people	T-ATS-14	Austal USA			Cancelled	
Unnamed		T-ATS-15	Austal USA			Cancelled	
