= Snatcher =

Snatcher may refer to:

- Snatcher, a criminal who engages in snatch theft
- Snatcher (video game), a 1988 graphic adventure game
- Snatcher Wes (Leo in Japanese), a character in the 2003 video game Pokémon Colosseum
- Snatcher, a character in the 2017 video game A Hat in Time
- The Snatcher, a 2014 teen novel by Anthony McGowan
- Snatchers, an organization within the Death Eaters in the Harry Potter books
- Snatchers, a 2019 comedy horror film

== See also ==
- Snatch (disambiguation)
- Snatched (disambiguation)
