= Bollinger Shipyards =

Shipyard in Lockport, Louisiana

Bollinger Shipyards LLC
- Type: LLC
- Industry: Shipbuilding, defense
- Founded: 1946; 80 years ago
- Founder: Donald G. Bollinger
- Headquarters: Lockport, Louisiana, United States
- Area served: Worldwide
- Key people: Benjamin G. Bordelon (President and CEO)
- Products: Patrol boats, Cutters, workboats, barges, tugboats
- Website: www.bollingershipyards.com

Bollinger Shipyards is an American constructor of ships, workboats and patrol vessels. Its thirteen shipyards and forty drydocks are located in Louisiana and Texas. Its drydocks range in capacity from vessels of 100 tons displacement to 22,000 tons displacement. The firm was founded in 1946.

== Coast Guard vessels ==
The United States Coast Guard has called upon Bollinger Shipyards to build many of its patrol vessels.

=== Marine Protector cutters ===
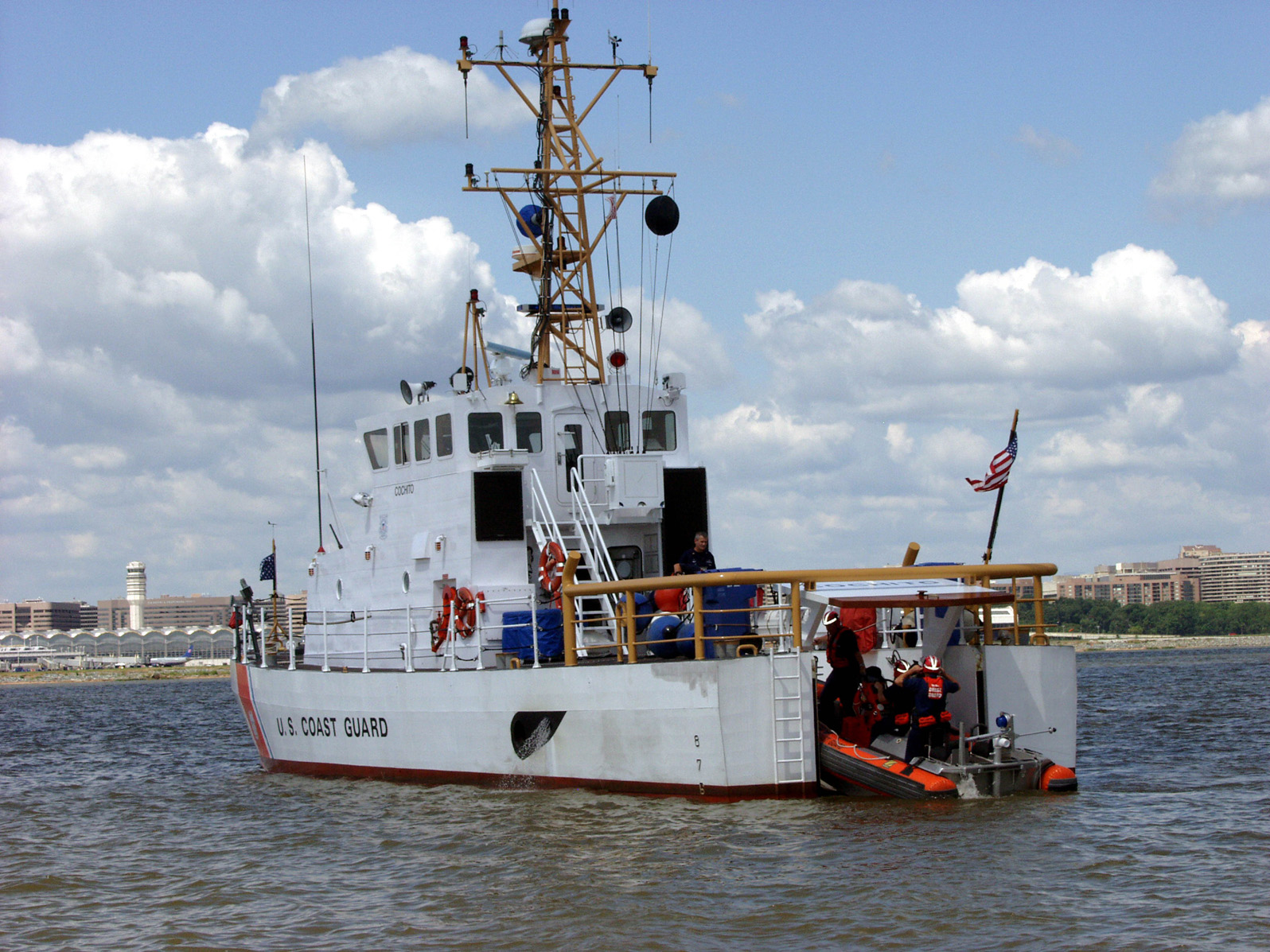
A Marine Protector showing its stern launching ramp with transom raised.

Bollinger secured the contract to build approximately fifty Marine Protector cutters. These 87-foot (27 m) vessels were staffed by a crew of 10. Uniquely for Coast Guard vessels of this size they were designed to be capable of being crewed by crews of mixed sex. These high-speed vessels were lightly armed, mounting two Browning M2 fifty caliber machine guns. They were equipped with a stern launching ramp, capable of launching and retrieving a high-speed pursuit boat while the cutter was still in motion. The launch and retrieval of the pursuit boat required just one sailor to remain on deck.

Over 70 vessels were constructed. Four were built for other nations. Four were built for the United States Navy, although those vessels are crewed and operated by the Coast Guard.

=== Island-class cutters ===
Bollinger originally built 49 110-foot (34 m) Island-class cutters, so called because each cutter was named after an island. These vessels were staffed by a crew of 18, and their primary armament was a 25 mm autocannon. Bollinger secured a contract to refit eight of the Island-class cutters, adding thirteen feet to their stern, so they could launch and retrieve a pursuit boat from a rear launching ramp. The refit included replacing the original deckhouse and refitting the crew accommodation so they could carry a mixed-gender crew of 18.

The conversion added 15 tons to each vessel. All of the eight refitted 123-foot (37 m) Island-class cutters' hulls would crack when driven at high speed in a heavy seas, and proved to be so unseaworthy that they were all withdrawn from service, forcing the scrapping of the conversion program. As a result, in August 2011, the US government sued Bollinger over the failed modifications, alleging that the company made false statements about the hull strength that would result from its extensions to the patrol boats.

First Sentinel-class Fast Response Cutter (FRC), USCGC Bernard C. Webber

=== Sentinel-class cutters ===
In September 2008, Bollinger was awarded US$88 million to build the prototype of the Sentinel-class fast-response cutters. In 2008, Bollinger secured a contract to build the first group of 24 to 34 cutters. In May 2016 the U.S. Coast Guard signed a new contract with Bollinger to build 26 additional vessels, bringing the total on order to 58, at a cost of almost $3.8 billion. A news release said that the new ships will replace ones that Bollinger built more than 30 years previously.

The 154-foot (47 m) 240-ton vessels are staffed by a mixed-sex crew of 22, and are armed with a remote-operated Mk 38 Mod 2 25 mm autocannon and four .50 caliber crew-served Browning M2 machine guns. These vessels can stern launch and retrieve a high speed pursuit boat, without coming to a stop. They were designed for missions of five days. The first three vessels were launched in 2011. As of mid-2017, 23 had entered service, with deliveries occurring every 73 days.

=== Polar Security Class Icebreakers ===
Bollinger was one of five contractors which bid to build new heavy polar icebreakers for the United States Coast Guard. The five bidders were each awarded a $20 million contract for development work. Bollinger announced that, if it were the winning bidder, it would have built the icebreakers in its Tampa, Florida shipyard, which it predicted would have employed 1,000 workers for ten years. The vessels were awarded to VT Halter Marine. Bollinger Shipyard bought VT Halter including the USCG PSC Contract.

== United States Navy vessels ==
=== Cyclone-class patrol ships ===
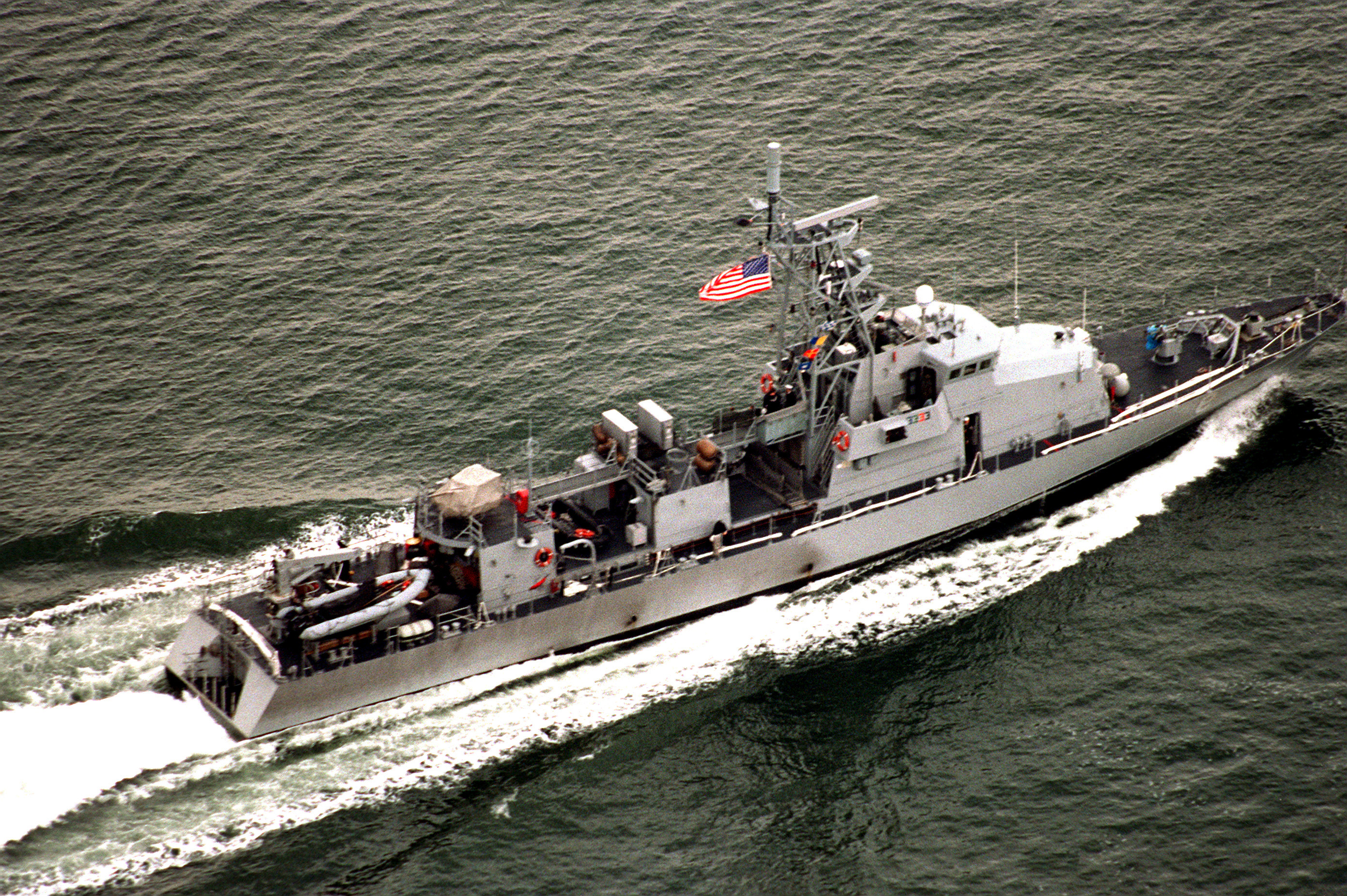
USS Chinook -- like the Coast Guard vessels the Cyclone-class vessels deploy and retrieve their pursuit boat via a stern launching ramp

Bollinger built 14 Cyclone-class patrol ships for the U.S. Navy between 1993 and 2000. The ships are 179 ft (55 m) long and carry a crew of 28 (4 officers, 24 enlisted). Their mission is coastal patrol and interdiction surveillance. These ships can provide full mission support for Navy SEALs and other special operations forces. As of 2010, four of these vessels have been decommissioned in the Navy. Three had been loaned to the Coast Guard to fill patrol hours but have been returned to the USN as of October 2011. One vessel, PC-1, was transferred to the Philippine Navy, as an excess defense article.

As of 2015, ten of the U.S. Navy's thirteen Cyclone-class patrol ships were deployed to the Persian Gulf in case of a potential conflict with Iran. The remaining three ships of the class are slated to be transferred to Naval Station Mayport in Florida to work primarily with drug interdiction work with U.S. Naval Forces Southern Command (USNAVSO) / U.S. Fourth Fleet.

=== Navajo-class rescue and salvage ship ===
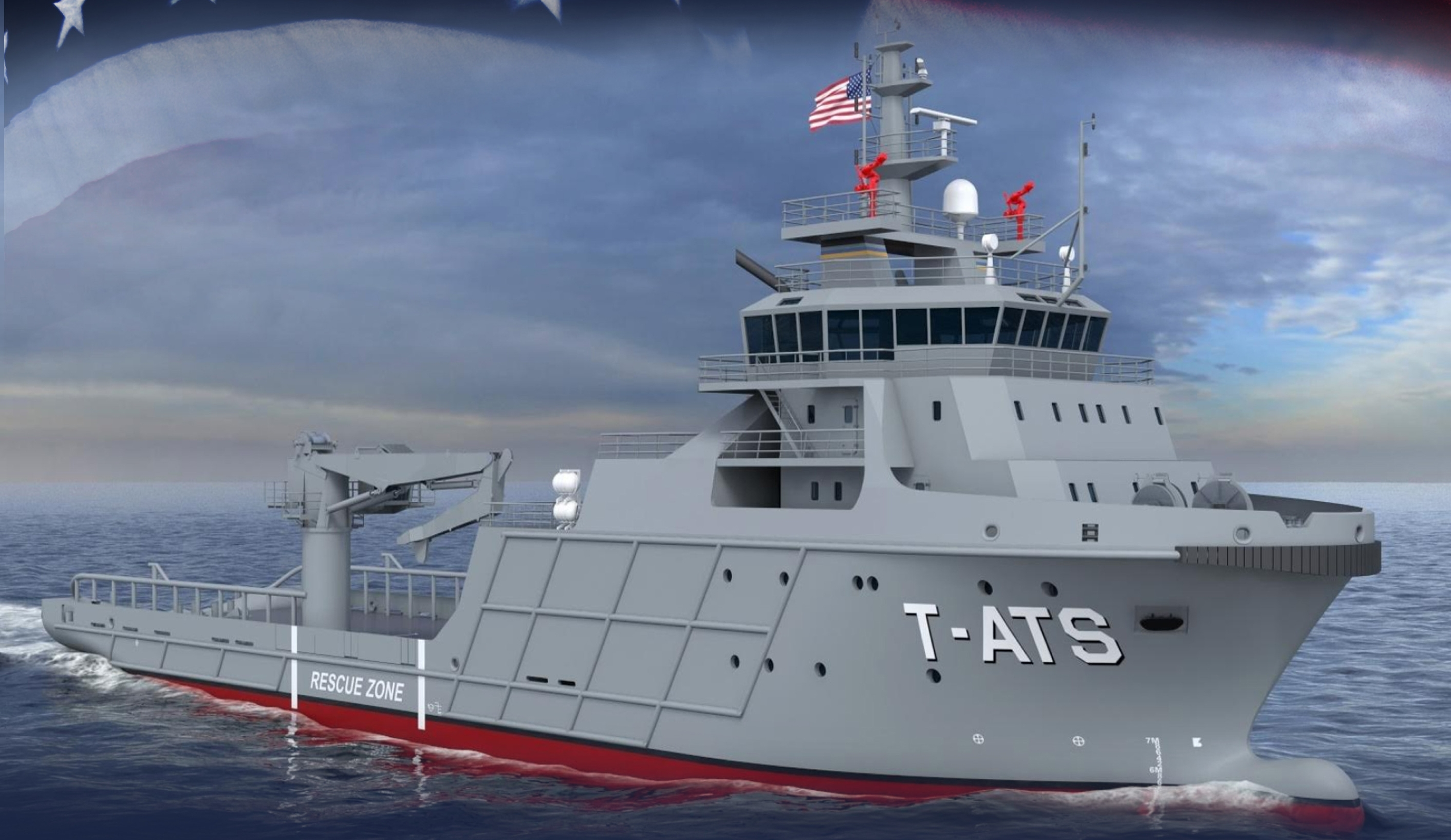
Artists representation of the new Navajo-class rescue and salvage ship

In April 2021, Bollinger bought the contract to build seven U.S. Navy Navajo-class rescue and salvage ship from Gulf Island Fabrication. Included in the deal was the shipyard Houma, Louisiana where the ships were being built. The first three ships were still under construction at the time of sale.
