= USNS Safeguard =

Lead ship of her class

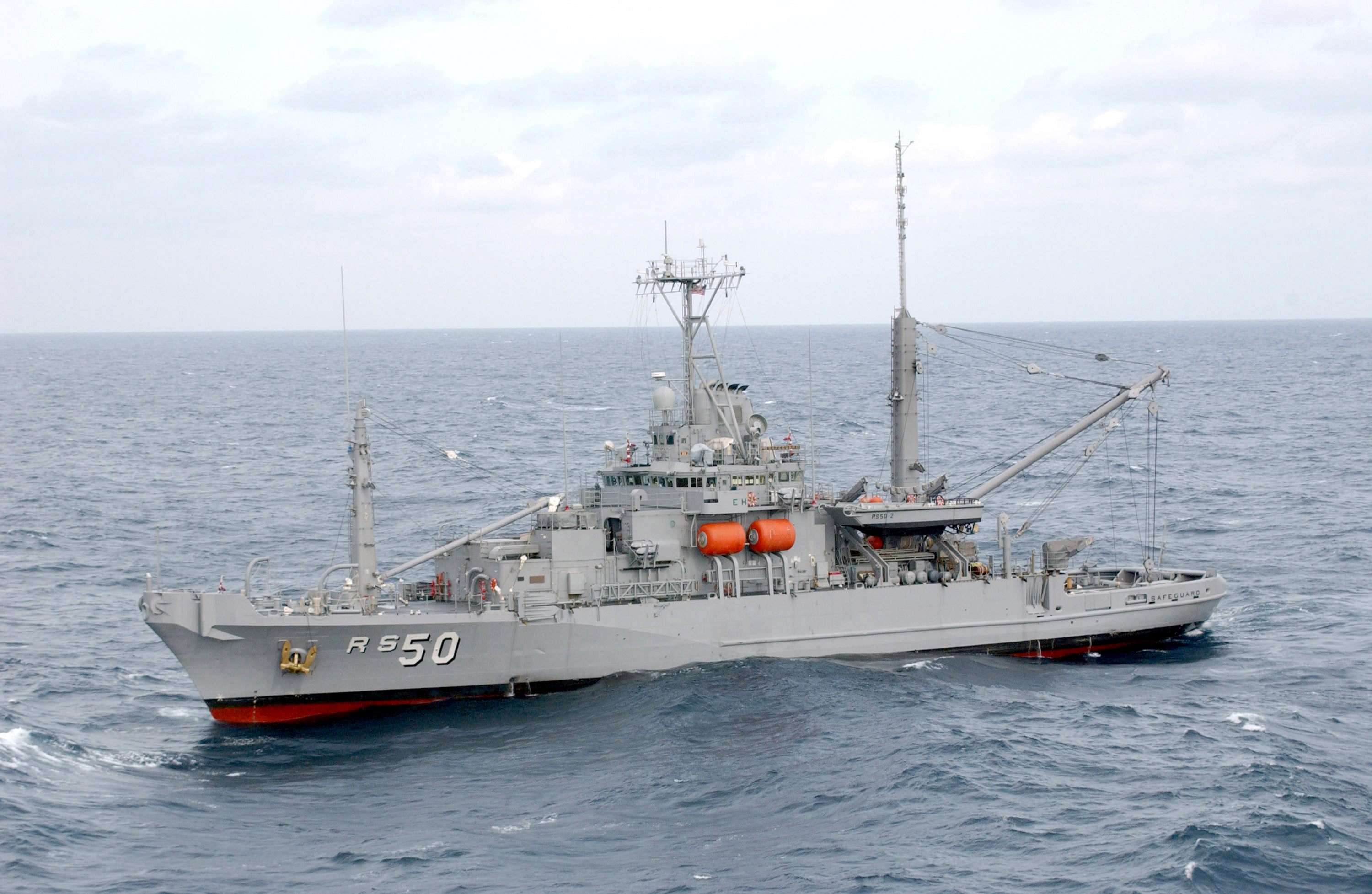
- Safeguard steams off the coast of Kyushu Island

History

United States
- Name: USS Safeguard
- Builder: Peterson Builders, Sturgeon Bay
- Laid down: 8 November 1982
- Launched: 12 November 1983
- Commissioned: 17 August 1985
- Decommissioned: 26 September 2007
- Out of service: 1 September 2016
- Identification: Callsign: NRUD
- Motto: "First in Class"
- Fate: Transferred to the Military Sealift Command, Deactivated and placed in Reserve Fleet September 2016

General characteristics
- Class & type: Safeguard-class rescue and salvage ship
- Displacement: 3,282 long tons (3,335 t) full
- Length: 255 ft (78 m) o/a
- Beam: 50 ft (15 m)
- Draft: 15 ft 6 in (4.72 m)
- Ice class: 1A
- Propulsion: 4 × Caterpillar 399 diesel engines; 4,200 shp (3 MW); 2 × shafts and controllable-pitch propellers
- Speed: 18 knots (33 km/h; 21 mph)
- Range: 17,500
- Complement: 100 (6 officers, 94 enlisted)
- Armament: 2 × Mk 38 25 mm chain guns; 2 × 0.5 in (12.7 mm) machine guns

USNS Safeguard (T-ARS-50), formerly USS Safeguard (ARS-50), is the lead ship of her class and the second United States Navy ship of that name.

Safeguard was laid down on 8 November 1982 by Peterson Builders, Sturgeon Bay, Wisconsin; launched on 12 November 1983; and commissioned on 17 August 1985.

Safeguard is the lead ship of the newest auxiliary rescue and salvage class of vessels constructed for the US Navy. The rugged construction of this steel-hulled vessel, combined with her speed and endurance, make Safeguard well-suited for rescue and salvage operations throughout the world. The hull below the waterline is ice-strengthened.

USNS Safeguard's sister ships are the USNS Grasp (T-ARS-51), USNS Salvor (T-ARS-52) and USNS Grapple (T-ARS-53).

On 26 September 2007 USS Safeguard was transferred to the Military Sealift Command as USNS Safeguard (T-ARS-50).

== Mission and capabilities ==
Like all Safeguard-class rescue and salvage ships, Safeguard serves as an element of the United States Navy's Combat Logistics Support Force and provides rescue and salvage services to the fleet at sea. She also supported the protection of forces ashore through post-assault salvage operations in close proximity to the shore. She is designed to perform combat salvage, lifting, towing, off-ship firefighting, manned diving operations, and emergency repairs to stranded or disabled vessels.

=== Salvage of disabled and stranded vessels ===
Disabled or stranded ships might require various types of assistance before retraction or towing can be attempted. In her 21,000 cubic feet (590 m^{3}) salvage hold, Safeguard carries transportable cutting and welding equipment, hydraulic and electric power sources, and de-watering gear. Safeguard also has salvage and machine shops, and hull repair materials to effect temporary hull repairs on stranded or otherwise damaged ships.

=== Retraction of stranded vessels ===
Stranded vessels can be retracted from a beach or reef by the use of Safeguard's towing machine and propulsion. Additional retraction force can be applied to a stranded vessel through the use of up to six legs of beach gear, consisting of 6,000-pound (2,700 kg) STATO anchors, wire rope, chain, and salvage buoys. In a typical configuration, two legs of beach gear are rigged on board Safeguard, and up to four legs of beach are rigged to the stranded vessel.

In addition to the standard legs of beach gear, Safeguard carries 4 spring buoys. The spring buoys are carried beneath the port and starboard bridge wings. Each spring buoy weighs approximately 3,100 pounds (1,400 kg), is 10 feet (3.0 m) long and 6 feet (1.8 m) in diameter, provides a net buoyancy of 7½ tons, and can withstand 125 tons of pull-through force. The spring buoys are used with beach gear legs rigged from a stranded vessel when deep water is found seaward of the stranded vessel.

=== Towing ===
Safeguard's propulsion machinery provides a bollard pull (towing force at zero speed and full power) of 68 tons.

The centerpiece of Safeguard's towing capability is an Almon A. Johnson Series 322 double-drum automatic towing machine. Each drum carries 3,000 feet (910 m) of 2 1/4-inch-diameter (57 mm), drawn galvanized, 6×37 right-hand lay, wire-rope towing hawsers, with closed zinc-poured sockets on the bitter end. The towing machine uses a system to automatically pay-in and pay-out the towing hawser to maintain a constraint strain.

The automatic towing machine also includes a Series 400 traction winch that can be used with synthetic line towing hawsers up to 14 inches in circumference. The traction winch has automatic payout but only manual recovery.

The Safeguard's caprail is curved to fairlead and prevent chafing of the towing hawser. It includes two vertical stern rollers to tend the towing hawser directly aft and two Norman pin rollers to prevent the towing hawser from sweeping forward of the beam at the point of tow. The stern rollers and Norman pins are raised hydraulically and can withstand a lateral force of 50,000 pounds (23,000 kg) at mid barrel.

Two tow bows provide a safe working area on the fantail during towing operations.

=== Manned diving operations ===
Safeguard has several diving systems to support different types of operations. Divers descend to diving depth on a diving stage that is lowered by one of two powered davits.

The diving locker is equipped with a double-lock hyperbaric chamber for decompression after deep dives or for the treatment of divers suffering from decompression sickness.

The KM-37 diving system supports manned diving to depths of 190 feet (58 m) on surfaced-supplied air. A fly-away mixed gas system can be used to enable the support of diving to a maximum depth of 300 feet (91 m).

The MK20 MOD0 diving system allows surface-supplied diving to a depth of 60 feet (18 m) with lighter equipment.

Safeguard carries SCUBA equipment for dives that require greater mobility than is possible in tethered diving.

=== Recovery of submerged objects ===
In addition to her two main ground tackle anchors [6,000-pound (2,700 kg) Navy standard stockless or 8,000-pound (3,600 kg) balanced-fluke anchors] Safeguard can use equipment associated with her beach gear to lay a multi-point open water moor to station herself for diving and ROV operations.

A typical four-point moor consists of an X pattern with four Stato Anchors at the outside corners and Safeguard at the center, made fast to a spring buoy for the close end of each mooring leg with synthetic mooring lines. Using her capstans, Safeguard can shorten or lengthen the mooring line for each leg and change her position within the moor.

Safeguard has a 7.5-ton-capacity boom on her forward kingpost and a 40-ton-capacity boom on her aft kingpost.

=== Heavy Lift ===
Safeguard has heavy lift system that consists of large bow and stern rollers, deck machinery, and tackle. The rollers serve as low-friction fairlead for the wire rope or chain used for the lift. The tackle and deck machinery provide up to 75 tons of hauling for each lift. The two bow rollers can be used together with linear hydraulic pullers to achieve a dynamic lift of 150 tons. The stern rollers can be used with the automatic towing machine to provide a dynamic lift of 150 tons. All four rollers can be used together for a dynamic lift of 300 tons or a static tidal lift of 350 tons.

Safeguard also has two auxiliary bow rollers, which can support of 75 ton lift when used together.

=== Off-ship fire-fighting ===
Safeguard has three manually operated fire monitors, one on the forward signal bridge, one on the aft signal bridge, and one on the forecastle, that can deliver up to 1,000 gallons per minute of seawater or aqueous film forming foam (AFFF) When originally built, Safeguard had a fourth remotely controlled fire monitor mounted on her forward kingpost, but this was later removed. Safeguard has a 3,600-gallon foam tank.

=== Emergency ship salvage material ===
In addition to the equipment carried by Safeguard, the US Navy Supervisor of Salvage maintains a stock of additional emergency fly-away salvage equipment that can be deployed aboard the salvage ships to support a wide variety of rescue and salvage operations.

== Service ==
In September 1989, divers from Safeguard surveyed the wreck of the Imperial Japanese Navy submarine Ro-65, which sank in the harbor at Kiska in the Aleutian Islands in November 1942 during World War II.

During Operation Tomodachi, Safeguard was one of several ships participating in disaster relief after the 2011 Tōhoku earthquake and tsunami. Divers from the ship helped clear the port at Hachinohe, Aomori to facilitate the delivery of relief supplies via the city.

Safeguard assisted in the recovery process of MV Sewol that sank in Jindo, South Korea on 16 April 2014.

== Status ==
Safeguard was placed in "Out of Service, in Reserve" on 1 October 2016 and is stored in the Naval Inactive Ship Maintenance Facility at Pearl Harbor, Hawaii.
