= Grabs =

Grabs may refer to:

- Grabs, Switzerland, a municipality in the canton of St. Gallen
- Detlev Grabs (born 1960), East German swimmer
- Grabs (skateboarding)

== See also ==
- Grab (disambiguation)
- Up for Grabs (disambiguation)
