= Snatched =

Snatched may refer to:

- Snatched (1973 film), an American made-for-television crime film starring Howard Duff and John Saxon
- Snatched (2017 film), an American comedy film starring Goldie Hawn and Amy Schumer

== See also ==
- Snatch (disambiguation)
- Snatcher (disambiguation)
