= Ben Bordelon =

American football player (born 1974)

No. 69
- Position: Offensive tackle

Personal information
- Born: April 9, 1974 (age 52); Mathews, Louisiana, U.S.
- Listed height: 6 ft 6 in (1.98 m)
- Listed weight: 305 lb (138 kg)

Career information
- High school: Central Lafourche (Mathews)
- College: LSU
- NFL draft: 1997: undrafted

Career history
- San Diego Chargers (1997-1999)

Awards and highlights
- Second-team All-SEC (1996)

Career NFL statistics
- Games played: 16
- Games started: 2
- Stats at Pro Football Reference

Benjamin Gerald Bordelon (born April 9, 1974) is an American former professional football player who was an offensive tackle for the San Diego Chargers of the National Football League (NFL) in 1997. He played college football for the LSU Tigers, starting for four seasons as an offensive guard and tackle and earning second-team All-Southeastern Conference honors as a senior in 1996.

Since 2014, Bordelon has been president, chairman, and chief executive officer of Bollinger Shipyards. He has been chief operating officer since 2013 and a board member since 2002. Bordelon is a grandson of Bollinger founder Donald G. Bollinger.
