= Safeguard-class rescue and salvage ship =

United States Navy salvage and rescue ships

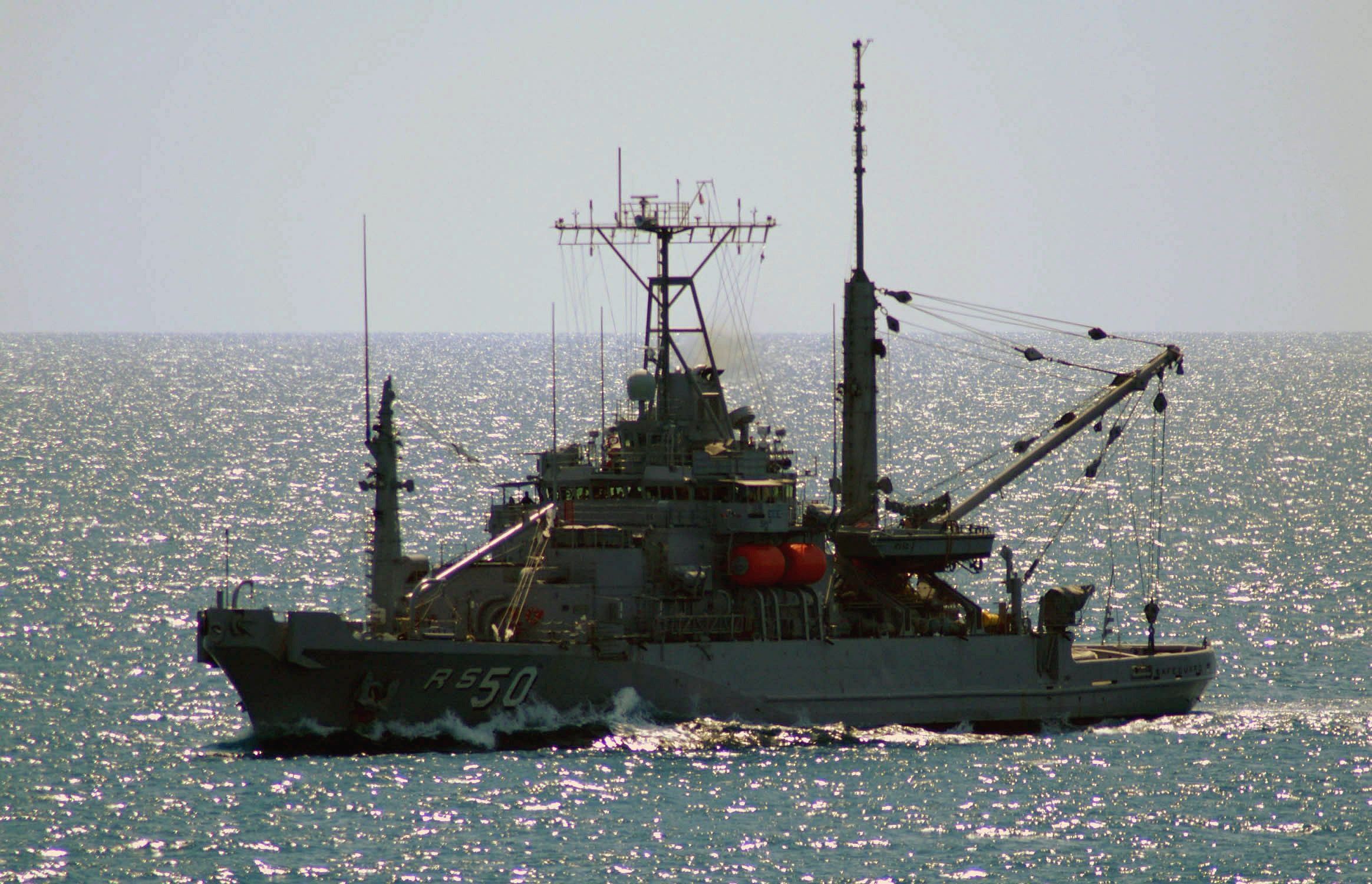
- USS Safeguard

Class overview
- Name: Safeguard class
- Builders: Peterson Builders
- Operators: United States Navy
- Preceded by: Bolster class
- Succeeded by: Navajo class
- Built: 1982–1984
- In commission: 1985–present
- Planned: 5
- Completed: 4
- Canceled: 1
- Active: 2
- Retired: 2

General characteristics
- Type: Rescue and salvage ship
- Displacement: 3,282 long tons (3,335 t) full
- Length: 255 ft (78 m) o/a
- Beam: 50 ft (15 m)
- Draft: 15 ft 6 in (4.72 m)
- Ice class: 1A
- Propulsion: 4 × Caterpillar 399 diesel engines; 4,200 shp (3 MW); 2 × shafts and controllable-pitch propellers
- Speed: 14.5 knots (26.9 km/h; 16.7 mph)
- Range: 17,500
- Complement: 100 (6 officers, 94 enlisted)
- Armament: 2 × Mk 38 25 mm chain guns; 2 × 0.5 in (12.7 mm) machine guns

The Safeguard class is a class of Towing, Salvage and Rescue Ship under the United States Navy.

== Development and design ==
Like all Safeguard-class rescue and salvage ships, Safeguard serves as an element of the United States Navy's Combat Logistics Support Force and provides rescue and salvage services to the fleet at sea. She also supported the protection of forces ashore through post-assault salvage operations in close proximity to the shore. She is designed to perform combat salvage, lifting, towing, off-ship firefighting, manned diving operations, and emergency repairs to stranded or disabled vessels.

=== Salvage of disabled and stranded vessels ===
Disabled or stranded ships might require various types of assistance before retraction or towing can be attempted. In her 21,000 cubic feet (590 m^{3}) salvage hold, Safeguard carries transportable cutting and welding equipment, hydraulic and electric power sources, and de-watering gear. Safeguard also has salvage and machine shops, and hull repair materials to effect temporary hull repairs on stranded or otherwise damaged ships.

=== Retraction of stranded vessels ===
Stranded vessels can be retracted from a beach or reef by the use of Safeguard's towing machine and propulsion. Additional retraction force can be applied to a stranded vessel through the use of up to six legs of beach gear, consisting of 6,000-pound (2,700 kg) STATO anchors, wire rope, chain, and salvage buoys. In a typical configuration, two legs of beach gear are rigged on board Safeguard, and up to four legs of beach are rigged to the stranded vessel.

In addition to the standard legs of beach gear, Safeguard carries 4 spring buoys. The spring buoys are carried beneath the port and starboard bridge wings. Each spring buoy weighs approximately 3,100 pounds (1,400 kg), is 10 feet (3.0 m) long and 6 feet (1.8 m) in diameter, provides a net buoyancy of 7½ tons, and can withstand 125 tons of pull-through force. The spring buoys are used with beach gear legs rigged from a stranded vessel when deep water is found seaward of the stranded vessel.

=== Towing ===
Safeguard's propulsion machinery provides a bollard pull (towing force at zero speed and full power) of 68 tons.

The centerpiece of Safeguard's towing capability is an Almon A. Johnson Series 322 double-drum automatic towing machine. Each drum carries 3,000 feet (910 m) of 2 1/4-inch-diameter (57 mm), drawn galvanized, 6×37 right-hand lay, wire-rope towing hawsers, with closed zinc-poured sockets on the bitter end. The towing machine uses a system to automatically pay-in and pay-out the towing hawser to maintain a constraint strain.

The automatic towing machine also includes a Series 400 traction winch that can be used with synthetic line towing hawsers up to 14 in (360 mm) in circumference. The traction winch has automatic payout but only manual recovery.

The Safeguard's caprail is curved to fairlead and prevent chafing of the towing hawser. It includes two vertical stern rollers to tend the towing hawser directly aft and two Norman pin rollers to prevent the towing hawser from sweeping forward of the beam at the point of tow. The stern rollers and Norman pins are raised hydraulically and can withstand a lateral force of 50,000 pounds (23,000 kg) at mid barrel.

Two tow bows provide a safe working area on the fantail during towing operations.

=== Manned diving operations ===
Safeguard has several diving systems to support different types of operations. Divers descend to diving depth on a diving stage that is lowered by one of two powered davits.

The diving locker is equipped with a double-lock hyperbaric chamber for decompression after deep dives or for the treatment of divers suffering from decompression sickness.

The KM-37 diving system supports manned diving to depths of 190 feet (58 m) on surfaced-supplied air. A fly-away mixed gas system can be used to enable the support of diving to a maximum depth of 300 feet (91 m).

The MK20 MOD0 diving system allows surface-supplied diving to a depth of 60 feet (18 m) with lighter equipment.

Safeguard carries SCUBA equipment for dives that require greater mobility than is possible in tethered diving.

=== Recovery of submerged objects ===
In addition to her two main ground tackle anchors [6,000-pound (2,700 kg) Navy standard stockless or 8,000-pound (3,600 kg) balanced-fluke anchors] Safeguard can use equipment associated with her beach gear to lay a multi-point open water moor to station herself for diving and ROV operations.

A typical four-point moor consists of an X pattern with four Stato Anchors at the outside corners and Safeguard at the center, made fast to a spring buoy for the close end of each mooring leg with synthetic mooring lines. Using her capstans, Safeguard can shorten or lengthen the mooring line for each leg and change her position within the moor.

Safeguard has a 7.5-ton-capacity boom on her forward kingpost and a 40-ton-capacity boom on her aft kingpost.

=== Heavy lift ===
Safeguard has heavy lift system that consists of large bow and stern rollers, deck machinery, and tackle. The rollers serve as low-friction fairlead for the wire rope or chain used for the lift. The tackle and deck machinery provide up to 75 tons of hauling for each lift. The two bow rollers can be used together with linear hydraulic pullers to achieve a dynamic lift of 150 tons. The stern rollers can be used with the automatic towing machine to provide a dynamic lift of 150 tons. All four rollers can be used together for a dynamic lift of 300 tons or a static tidal lift of 350 tons.

Safeguard also has two auxiliary bow rollers, which can support of 75 ton lift when used together.

=== Off-ship fire-fighting ===
Safeguard has three manually operated fire monitors, one on the forward signal bridge, one on the aft signal bridge, and one on the forecastle, that can deliver up to 1,000 gallons per minute of seawater or aqueous film forming foam (AFFF). When originally built, Safeguard had a fourth remotely controlled fire monitor mounted on her forward kingpost, but this was later removed. Safeguard has a 3,600-gallon foam tank.

=== Emergency ship salvage material ===
In addition to the equipment carried by Safeguard, the US Navy Supervisor of Salvage maintains a stock of additional emergency fly-away salvage equipment that can be deployed aboard the salvage ships to support a wide variety of rescue and salvage operations.

== Ships in class ==
Safeguard class
| Name | Hull number | Builder | Laid down | Launched | Commissioned | Decommissioned | Status |
|---|---|---|---|---|---|---|---|
| Safeguard | T-ARS-50 | Peterson Builders | 8 November 1982 | 12 November 1982 | 17 August 1985 | 1 October 2016 | Deactivated |
| Grasp | T-ARS-51 | Peterson Builders | 20 March 1983 | 21 May 1984 | 14 December 1985 | | Active |
| Salvor | T-ARS-52 | Peterson Builders | 16 September 1982 | 12 November 1983 | 14 June 1986 | | Active |
| Grapple | T-ARS-53 | Peterson Builders | 28 April 1984 | 8 December 1984 | 15 November 1986 | 1 October 2016 | Deactivated |
| Canceled | ARS-54 | Peterson Builders | N/A | | | | |

== Gallery ==
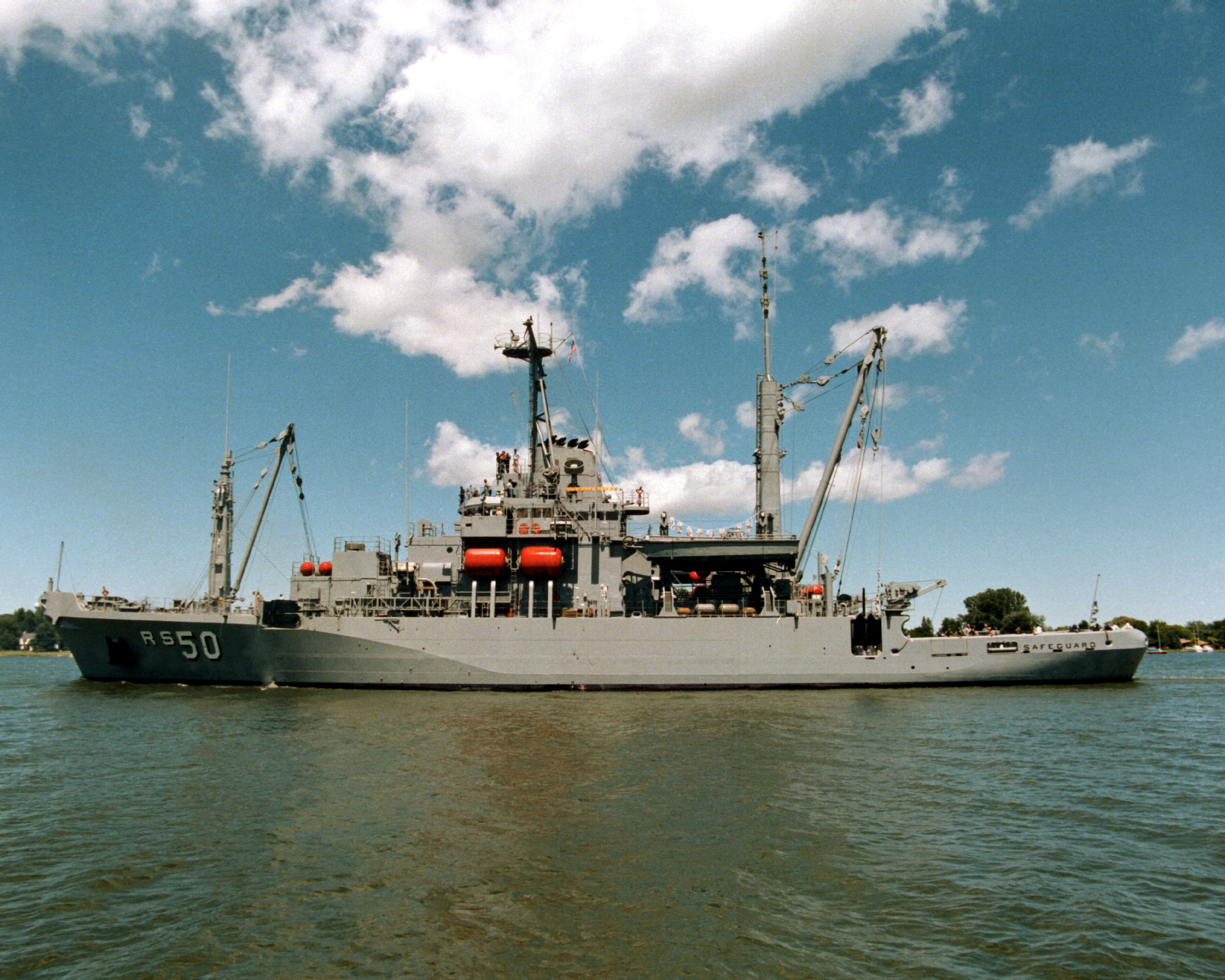
USS Safeguard

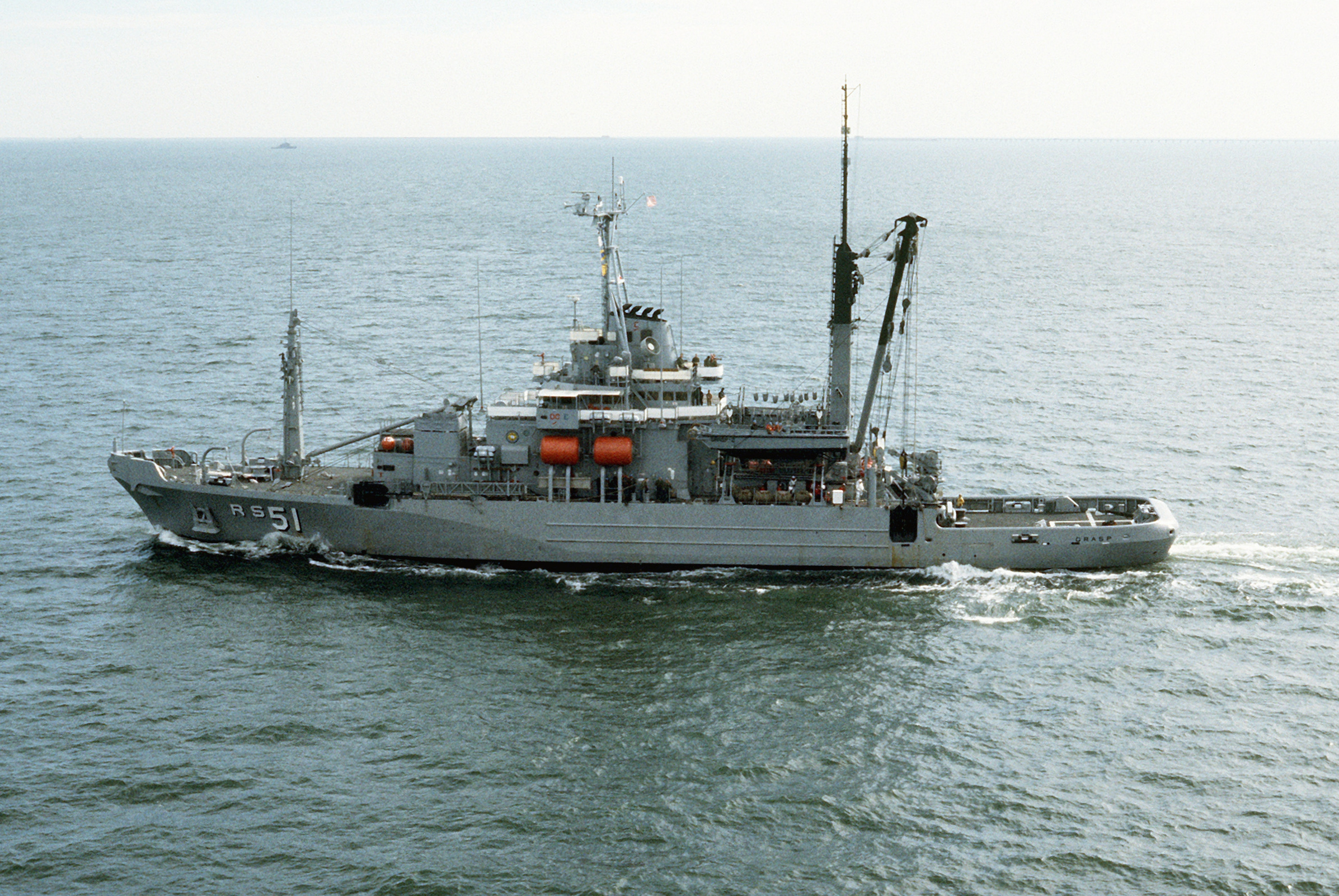
USS Grasp

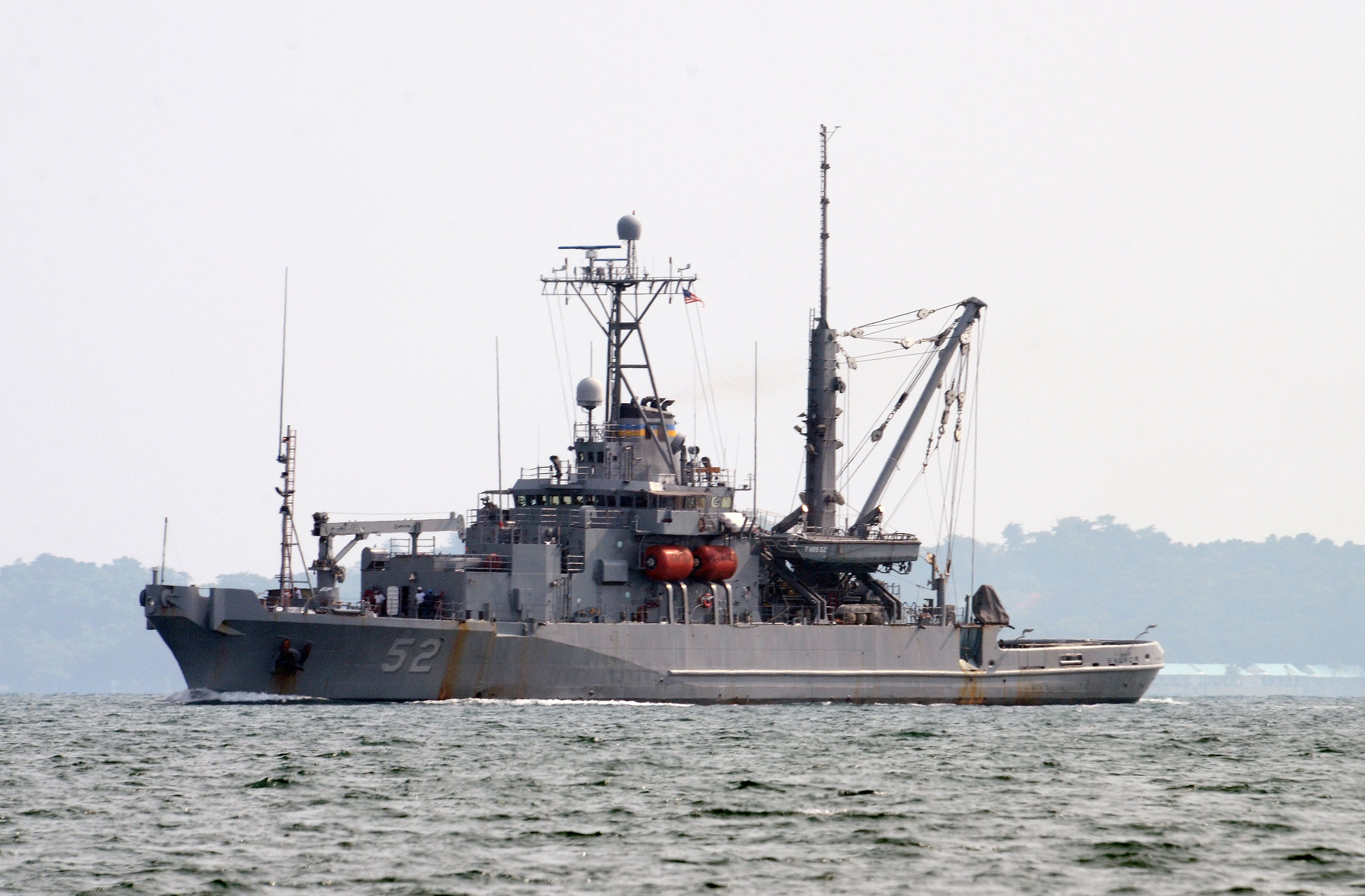
USS Salvor

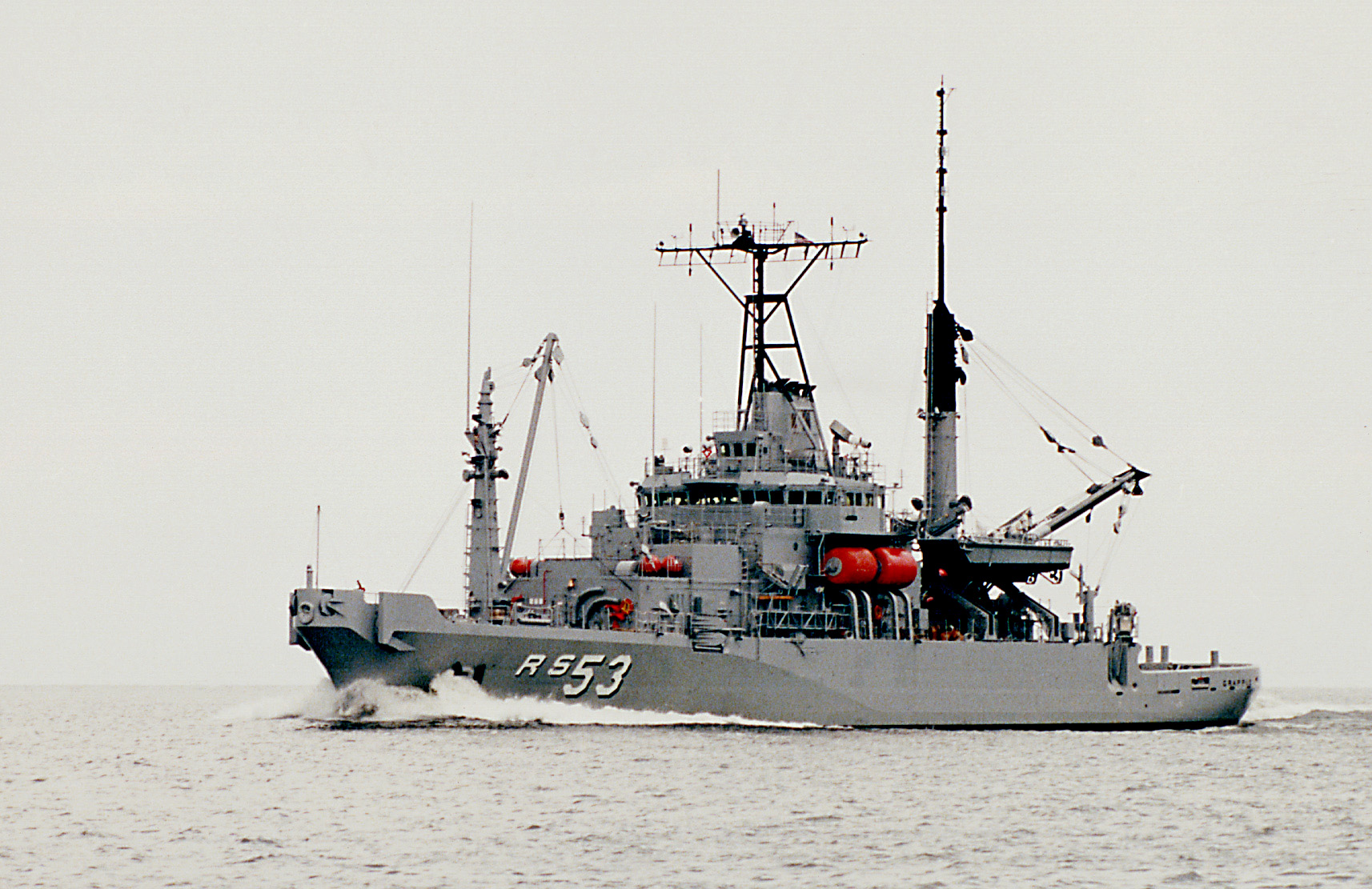
USS Grapple

== See also ==
- Da Wu-class rescue and salvage ship
- Geo Barents
- ERV Nene Hatun
