= Integrated Electrical Services =

Electric company

IES Holdings, Inc.
- Type: Public
- Traded as: Nasdaq: IESC; S&P 400 component
- Industry: Construction & Engineering
- Founded: 1997; 29 years ago
- Headquarters: Sugar Land, Texas, U.S.
- Key people: Jeffrey Gendell (Chairman); Tracy McLauchlin (CFO)
- Revenue: ▲US$2.4 billion (2023)
- Number of employees: 16,000+
- Website: ies-co.com

IES Holdings, Inc., formerly known as Integrated Electrical Services, Inc., designs and installs integrated electrical and technology systems and provides infrastructure products and services to a variety of end markets, including data centers, residential housing, and commercial and industrial facilities.

IES is headquartered in Houston, Texas and has 170+ locations with 16,000+ employees across the continental United States.

== History ==
June 26, 1997 incorporates as Integrated Electrical Services Incorporated.

January 27, 1998, Integrated Electrical Services began trading with the symbol (IEE) on the New York Stock Exchange.

In 2002 Integrated Electrical Services was ranked as the largest electrical contractor in the United States, with $1.475 billion in revenue.

In February 2006, Integrated Electrical Services filed for chapter 11 bankruptcy and in the same year, three months later, emerged.

February 28, 2011 Integrated Electrical Services sold its subsidiary Key Electrical Supply Inc. to Elliott Electric Supply Inc.

In July 2020, Integrated Electrical Services was listed as number five on Houston Chronicle's "list of the region's 100 best performing public companies".

== Founding companies ==
- Houston-Stafford Electric
- Mills Electrical Contractors Inc.
- BW Consolidated Inc.
- Pollock Electric Inc.
- Muth Electric
- Daniel Electrical Contractors, Inc
- Amber Electric
- Haymaker Electric
- Summit Electric of Texas Inc.
- Thurman & O'Connell
- Rodgers
- Hatfield
- Ace
- Reynolds
- Popp

== Business Segments ==
- Infrastructure Solutions – Electro-mechanical
- Communications – Technology services to corporations.
- Residential – Electrical services to multi and single family type housing.
- Industrial & Commercial – Design, construct and maintain industrial and commercial type of operations.

== Acquisitions ==
- MISCOR Group, Ltd., March 2013, $24 million
- Menninga Electric, Pella, Iowa, November 20, 2015
- Shanahan Mechanical and Electrical, Inc., November 20, 2015
- Technibus, Inc., Canton, Ohio, 2016 $45 million cash
- NEXT Electric, LLC, July 14, 2017, 80% interests
- Azimuth Communications, Inc., Portland, Oregon, April 06, 2018
- Electrical Contractors North, Inc., Salt Lake City, Utah, July 31, 2018
- Wright Electrical Contracting Inc., Daphne, Alabama
- H.R. Allen, Charleston, South Carolina
- Florida Industrial Electric, Orlando, Florida
- Cypress Electrical Contractors, New Orleans, Louisiana
- Mark Henderson Inc., Decatur, Georgia
- Bayonet Plumbing, Heating and Air-Conditioning, December 21, 2020, 80% interests.
- Edmonson Electric, May 18, 2021, "80% interest".
