= Grab (surname) =

Grab is a surname. Notable people with the surname include:

- Alexandru Grab (born 1977), Moldavian footballer
- Christoph Grab (born 1967), Swiss jazz musician
- Hermann Grab (1903–1949), Bohemian writer in the German language
- Michael Grab, Canadian artist specializing in rock balancing, photography and videography
- Sarah Grab (born 1978), Swiss road cyclist
- Amédée Grab (1930–2019) Swiss priest
- Vyacheslav Grab (born 1993) Russia Football player

== See also ==
- Detlev Grabs (born 1960), East German retired swimmer
