= Up for Grabs =

Up for Grabs may refer to:

- Up for Grabs (play), a play by David Williamson
- Up for Grabs (film), a 2004 comedic documentary
- Up for Grabs (album), a 1981 album by The Radiators
- Up For Grabs (board game), a variation of Anagrams, a word game played with letter tiles
- Up for Grabs...Live, an album by Spin Doctors
- Up for Grabs (video game), a game developed by Don Priestley for the ZX Spectrum
