= Gulf Island Fabrication =

American shipbuilder

Gulf Island Fabrication, Inc.
- Traded as: Nasdaq: GIFI; S&P 600 Component
- Founder: Alden “Doc” Laborde
- Headquarters: The Woodlands
- Revenue: US$ 303,308,000 (2019)
- Owner: IES Holdings
- Number of employees: 944 (2019)
- Website: www.gulfisland.com

Gulf Island Fabrication is an American manufacturer of specialized structures and marine vessels used in the energy sector. it owns seven building yards in Louisiana and Texas and has Bechtel as a partner.

The company builds offshore oil and gas platforms, ships and also foundations for offshore wind turbines. In addition to building some of the world's largest offshore platforms, it also provides maintenance and marine repair services in-shop and out in the field.

== History ==
Based in Houston, Texas, Gulf Island Fabrication (GIF) was founded by Alden “Doc” Laborde, a World War II Navy commander who later worked the offshore oil and gas industry. In 1985, it took over a bankrupt rival named Delta Fabrication.

In 1997, when it went public, the firm offered 2,000,000 shares, totaling an offering of US$30 million. By diversifying its revenue streams to include shipbuilding, it expanded by acquiring the LeeVac Shipyards in 2016, generating approximately $112 million incremental contract backlog during the industry crisis.

On January 16, 2026, IES Holdings announced the completion of its acquisition of GIF.
