= USNS Grasp =

Safeguard-class rescue and salvage ship

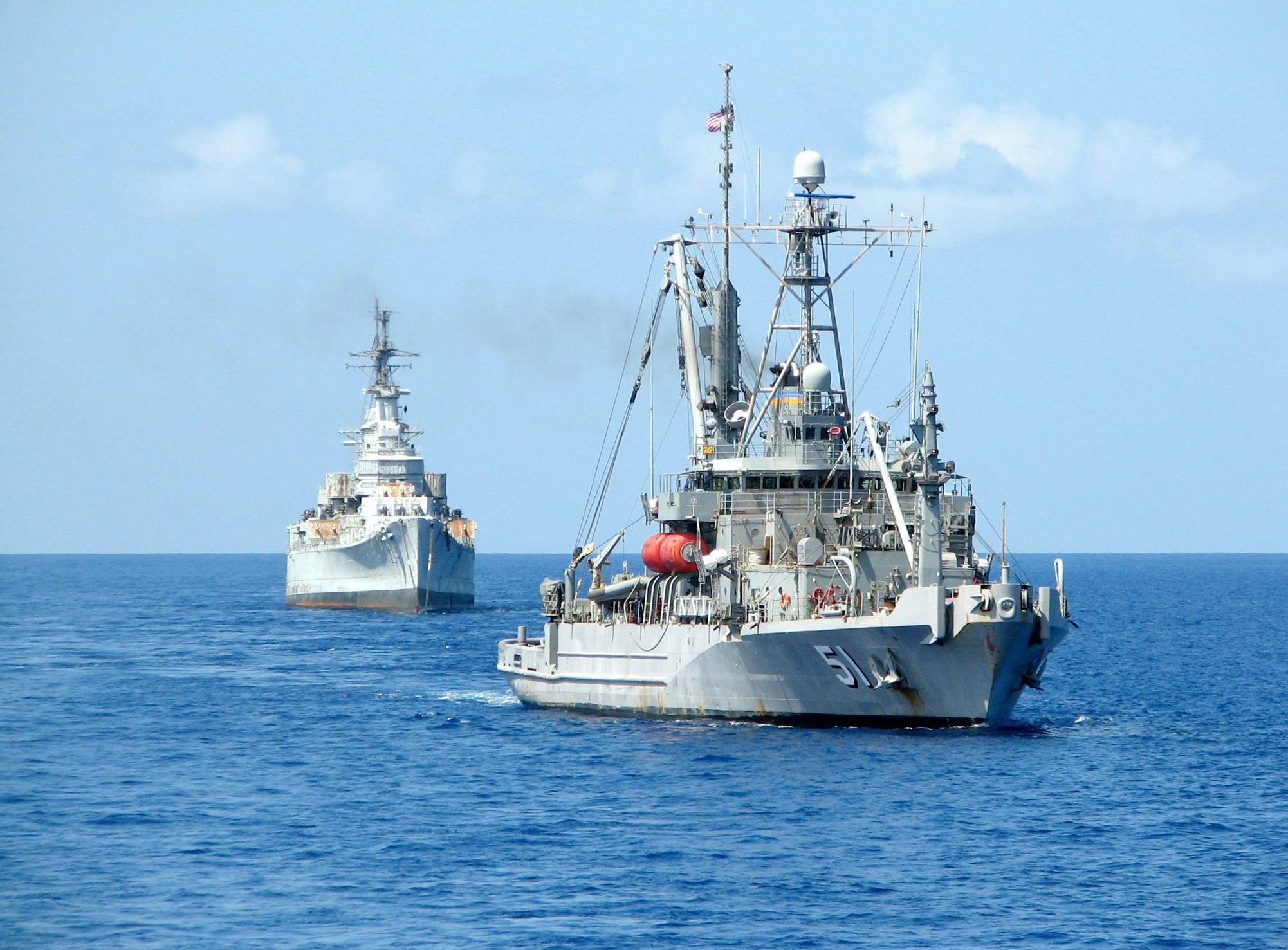
- USNS Grasp towing the ex-USS Des Moines for scrapping.

History

United States
- Name: USNS Grasp
- Builder: Peterson Builders, Sturgeon Bay
- Laid down: 30 March 1983
- Launched: 2 May 1985
- Commissioned: 16 December 1985
- Decommissioned: 19 January 2006
- Home port: Naval Base San Diego
- Identification: IMO number: 8434324; MMSI number: 338842000; Callsign: NADQ
- Motto: "Any Ocean Any Time"
- Fate: Transferred to the Military Sealift Command

General characteristics
- Class & type: Safeguard-class rescue and salvage ship
- Displacement: 3,282 long tons (3,335 t) full
- Length: 255 ft (78 m) o/a
- Beam: 50 ft (15 m)
- Draft: 15 ft 6 in (4.72 m)
- Propulsion: 4 × Caterpillar 399 diesel engines; 4,200 shp (3 MW); 2 × shafts and controllable-pitch propellers
- Speed: 15 knots (28 km/h; 17 mph)
- Complement: 30 US Navy (Military Sealift Command) Civilian Mariners.
- Armament: 2 × Mk 38 25 mm chain guns; 2 × 0.5 in (12.7 mm) machine guns

USNS Grasp (T-ARS-51) is a Safeguard-class rescue and salvage ship, the second United States Navy ship of that name.

Grasp was laid down on 30 March 1983 by Peterson Builders, Sturgeon Bay, Wisconsin; launched on 2 May 1985; and commissioned on 14 December 1985 as USS Grasp (ARS-51).

Grasp is the second ship of the newest auxiliary rescue and salvage class of vessels constructed for the US Navy. The rugged construction of this steel-hulled vessel, combined with her speed and endurance, make Grasp well-suited for rescue and salvage operations throughout the world. The hull below the waterline is ice-strengthened.

Grasp's sister ships are USNS Safeguard (T-ARS-50), USNS Salvor (T-ARS-52) and USNS Grapple (T-ARS-53).

== Service history ==
On 4 December 1989, Grasp joined other Navy ships in providing surface support during a Navy Trident missile test in the Atlantic Ocean. The environmental group Greenpeace had found out about the testing and had sent ships to protest this exercise. Greenpeace attacked the USS Kittiwake by hitting her aft port side with the bow of their ship, the MV Greenpeace. Grasp came to the aid of the Kittiwake and together sandwiched the 190-foot Greenpeace vessel, leaving a 3-foot-long gash in the hull of the Greenpeace forcing its crew members to stuff the breach with mattresses to keep the water out. The two ships proceeded to hose down the occupants of the protest vessel with cold sea water to discourage them from interfering and disabled its engines by shooting seawater down the smokestack into the engine room, making her dead in the water in rough seas, and thereby ending the morning-long cat-and-mouse game nearly 40 miles east of Cape Canaveral.

On 20 July 1999, it was Grasp that finally located the fuselage of the plane flown by John F. Kennedy Jr. Following the earthquake that devastated Haiti in 2010, Grasp was staffed with a team of structural engineers from the US Army Corps of Engineers and dispatched on 16 January 2010 to the country's devastated seaport in Port-au-Prince as part of Operation Unified Response to assess for and complete emergency structural repairs so that large military and civilian cargo vessels may unload their rescue aid shipments more efficiently.

On 19 January 2006, Grasp was decommissioned and transferred to the Military Sealift Command for non-commissioned service as USNS Grasp (T-ARS-51).

== Mission and capabilities ==
Like all Safeguard-class rescue and salvage ships, Grasp serves as an element of the United States Navy's Combat Logistics Support Force and provides rescue and salvage services to the fleet at sea. She also supported the protection of forces ashore through post-assault salvage operations in close proximity to the shore. She is designed to perform combat salvage, lifting, towing, off-ship firefighting, manned diving operations, and emergency repairs to stranded or disabled vessels.

=== Salvage of disabled and stranded vessels ===
Disabled or stranded ships might require various types of assistance before retraction or towing can be attempted. In her salvage hold, Grasp carries transportable cutting and welding equipment, hydraulic and electric power sources, and de-watering gear. Grasp also has salvage and machine shops, and hull repair materials to effect temporary hull repairs on stranded or otherwise damaged ships.

=== Retraction of stranded vessels ===
Stranded vessels can be retracted from a beach or reef by the use of Grasp's towing machine and propulsion. Additional retraction force can be applied to a stranded vessel through the use of up to six legs of beach gear, consisting of 6,000 pound STATO anchors, wire rope, chain, and salvage buoys. In a typical configuration, two legs of beach gear are rigged on board Grasp, and up to four legs of beach are rigged to the stranded vessel.

In addition to the standard legs of beach gear, Grasp carries 4 spring buoys. The spring buoys are carried beneath the port and starboard bridge wings. Each spring buoy weighs approximately 3100 pounds, is 10 feet (3.0 m) long and 6 feet (1.8 m) in diameter, provides a net buoyancy of 7½ tons, and can withstand 125 tons of pull-through force. The spring buoys are used with beach gear legs rigged from a stranded vessel when deep water is found seaward of the stranded vessel.

=== Towing ===
Grasp's propulsion machinery provides a bollard pull (towing force at zero speed and full power) of 68 tons.

The centerpiece of Grasp's towing capability is an Almon A. Johnson Series 322 double-drum automatic towing machine. Each drum carries 3,000 feet (910 m) of 2 1/4-inch-diameter (57 mm) drawn galvanized, 6×37 right-hand lay, wire-rope towing hawsers, with closed zinc-poured sockets on the bitter end. The towing machine uses a system to automatically pay-in and pay-out the towing hawser to maintain a constant strain.

The automatic towing machine also includes a Series 400 traction winch that can be used with synthetic line towing hawsers up to 14 inches in circumference. The traction winch has automatic payout but only manual recovery.

Grasp's caprail is curved to fairlead and prevent chafing of the towing hawser. It includes two vertical stern rollers to tend the towing hawser directly aft and two Norman pin rollers to prevent the towing hawser from sweeping forward of the beam at the point of tow. The stern rollers and Norman pins are raised hydraulically and can withstand a lateral force of 50,000 pounds (23,000 kg) at mid barrel.

Two tow bows provide a safe working area on the fantail during towing operations.

=== Manned diving operations ===
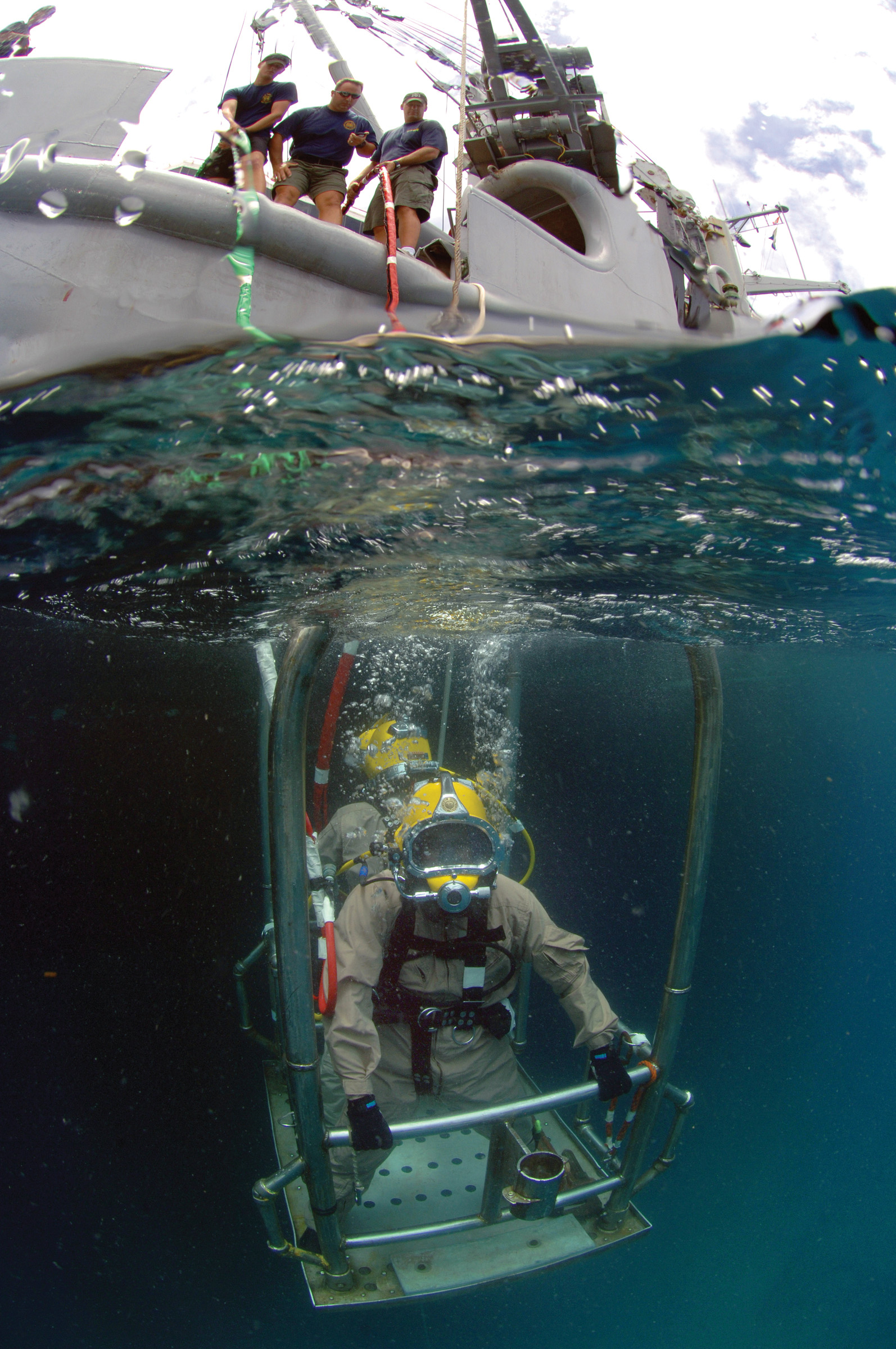
A diver rides a stage to the sea bed from USNS Grasp in St. Kitts during Global Fleet Station 2008.

Grasp has several diving systems to support different types of operations. Divers descend to diving depth on a diving stage that is lowered by one of two powered davits.

The diving locker is equipped with a double-lock hyperbaric chamber for recompression after deep dives or for the treatment of divers suffering from decompression sickness.

The MK21 MOD1 diving system supports manned diving to depths of 190 feet (58 m) on surfaced-supplied air. A fly-away mixed gas system can be used to enable the support of diving to a maximum depth of 300 feet.

The MK20 MOD0 diving system allows-surface supplied diving to a depth of 60 feet (18 m) with lighter equipment.

Grasp carries SCUBA equipment for dives that require greater mobility than is possible in tethered diving.

=== Recovery of submerged objects ===
In addition to her two main ground tackle anchors (6000 pound Navy standard stockless or 8000 pound balanced-fluke anchors) Grasp can use equipment associated with her beach gear to lay a multi-point open water moor to station herself for diving and ROV operations.

A typical four-point-moor consists of an X pattern with four Stato Anchors at the outside corners and Grasp at the center, made fast to a spring buoy for the close end of each mooring leg with synthetic mooring lines. Using her capstans, Grasp can shorten or lengthen the mooring line for each leg and change her position within the moor.

Grasp has a 7.5-ton capacity boom on her forward kingpost and a 40-ton capacity boom on her aft kingpost.

=== Heavy lift ===
Grasp has heavy lift system that consists of large bow and stern rollers, deck machinery, and tackle. The rollers serve as low-friction fairlead for the wire rope or chain used for the lift. The tackle and deck machinery provide up to 75 tons of hauling for each lift. The two bow rollers can be used together with linear hydraulic pullers to achieve a dynamic lift of 150 tons. The stern rollers can be used with the automatic towing machine to provide a dynamic lift of 150 tons. All four rollers can be used together for a dynamic lift of 300 tons or a static tidal lift of 350 tons.

Grasp also has two auxiliary bow rollers, which can support of 75 ton lift when used together.

=== Off-ship fire-fighting ===
Grasp has three manually operated fire monitors, one on the forward signal bridge, one on the aft signal bridge, and one on the forecastle, that can deliver up to 1,000 US gallons (3,800 L) per minute of seawater or aqueous film forming foam (AFFF) When originally built, Grasp had a fourth remotely controlled fire monitor mounted on her forward kingpost, but this was later removed. Grasp has a 3,600-US-gallon (14,000 L) foam tank.

=== Emergency ship salvage material ===
In addition to the equipment carried by Grasp, the US Navy Supervisor of Salvage maintains a stock of additional emergency fly-away salvage equipment that can be deployed aboard the salvage ships to support a wide variety of rescue and salvage operations.
