= Glaciogenic Reservoir Analogue Studies Project =

The Glaciogenic Reservoir Analogue Studies Project (GRASP) is a research group studying the subglacial to proglacial record of Pleistocene glacial events. It is based in the Delft University of Technology.

== Introduction to glaciogenic reservoirs ==
Glaciogenic reservoirs are sedimentary rocks deposited under an ice sheet influence and that are involved into a gas or oil reservoir. The glacial earth system is complex to study. A large amount on past and ongoing scientific programs work(ed) on our cryosphere and generate a lot of debate about its dynamic, sustainability and behavior against climate changes. Past glaciations or ice ages record occurred several times (Timeline of glaciation) along the geological time scale. As they are hundreds of million years old, these ancient glaciations are even more hard to analyse and study. Earth at that time had a different atmosphere composition, the chemistry of the oceans was also different, life evolution on earth had also a great impact on the dynamic of these ice sheets, the continents were in a particular setting, etc. Geologists have a broad idea of all those parameters but glaciologists know that this is the combination of those setting that bring to our current ice-age.

A glacial system is able to produce a very large amount of sediment due to the tremendous erosive forces of ice at its base. Those sediments are particularly coarse-grained (principally sandstones and conglomerates) and produced in consequent volumes . For their good reservoir properties, ancient glacially-related sediments have been targeted by oil industries. They are currently massively exploited in North Africa, in the Arabic peninsula, South Africa, and few small fields are present in Asia, Australia and Northern Europe. The main ice ages concerned are the Late Ordovician glaciation (Hirnantian) and the Permo-Carboniferous glaciations.

== Project objectives ==
Analogy is a usual geologist method, using the present day observations and project/adapt it to the ancient earth systems. The main problem of this technique is the time-scale considered and the observation methods used. Most of the time, observations of active ice-sheet processes are instantaneous at geological time-scale and hard to apply in the ancient. Furthermore, in the ancient, field and geophysical studies are carried out at lower resolution but on a wider scale (time and space). Finally, even if Subglacial lakes are observed below ice sheets, melt-water drainage system processes ongoing, especially like the tunnel valleys remain unobserved directly. The record of these huge subglacial "rivers" is mainly analysed via the recent ice ages imprints (Weichselian, Saalian and Pre-Illinoian or Elsterian stages) and in the ancient one (Late Ordovician and Permo-Carboniferous).

The idea of GRASP is to use methods commonly applied in the ancient onto recent glaciation record (Pleistocene). In the ancient, wide datasets are acquired by oil companies during exploration of sedimentary basins. By using the same type of data for the Pleistocene glacial record, the project tries to generate data comparable in between ancient and recent glaciations. The studied area is the North Sea that was glaciated during the Last Glacial Maximum as well as the Northwestern Europe. On the sea floor, around the North Sea and into the kilometre of sediments below, many traces and evidences of the glacial events are recorded. As this place is a petroleum province, many data, especially geophysics ones are currently released or could be borrowed for academic purposes.

So, by joining the skills of three different universities, with the help of many data providers and the funding of six oil companies, new income is made into the knowledge of paleo-glacial systems. Basin analysis containing geophysical, reservoir and sedimentological models are produced in a new way and in a new type of environment. In an economic point of view, oil companies are interested in these models to have comparable data with their oil fields. In an academic one, understanding the recent ice sheet dynamic and its associated subglacial meltwater flow is crucial in the context of climate changes or fundamentally solving the intricate glacial record equation of recent and past ice ages.

== See also ==
- Climate change (modern day)
- Climate change (general concept)
