= Grab (peak) =

Mountain in Kosovo

Coordinates: 43.174444°N 20.611389°E

Grab is a peak in northern Kosovo, on the border with Serbia.

Grab reaches a top height of approx. 1,000 m (3,281 ft).
