= Snatch =

Snatch may refer to:

== Art and entertainment ==
- Snatch, an album by Howie B
- Snatch, a first-wave punk duo formed by Judy Nylon and Patti Palladin
- "Snatch", an episode of Barlow at Large
- "Snatch" (Space Ghost Coast to Coast), a television episode
- Snatch (film), a 2000 British crime comedy film
- Snatch (TV series), a 2017 TV series based on the film
- Anagrams (also known as Anagram, Grabscrab, Pirate Scrabble, Snatch, Taking, and Word Making), a tile-based word game that involves rearranging letter tiles to form words

== Vehicles ==
- Snatch Land Rover, a paramilitary vehicle
- USS Snatch (ARS-27), a 1944 ship

== Other uses ==
- Snatch (weightlifting), one of two events in Olympic weight lifting
- Snatch, a derogatory slang term for the vulva
- Snatch theft, a type of crime

== See also ==
- Grab (disambiguation)
- Snatched (disambiguation)
