= USS Grasp =

USS Grasp may refer to the following ships operated by the United States Navy:

- USS Grasp (ARS-24), was launched 31 July 1943 and decommissioned 31 March 1978. She was transferred to South Korea and served as the Chang Won (ARS-25) until 1998
- USNS Grasp (T-ARS-51), was launched 2 May 1985 and decommissioned 19 January 2006, and one of its most historical missions was to help in the recovery effort of TWA Flight 800.
