= Grace St. Paul's Episcopal Church =

Church building in Mercerville, New Jersey

Coordinates: 40.2375°N 74.6938°W

GraSP

Grace St. Paul's Episcopal Church commonly referred to as GraSP or Grace St. Paul's is an Episcopal Church (in the Anglican Communion) located in Mercerville, New Jersey. It is a parish of the Episcopal Diocese of New Jersey.

The church reported 227 members in 2017 and 115 members in 2023; no membership statistics were reported nationally in 2024 parochial reports. Plate and pledge income reported for the congregation in 2024 was $110,463. Average Sunday attendance (ASA) in 2023 was 40 persons, down from a reported 85 in 2016.

== History ==
Grace-St. Paul's parish is the realization of parishioners from two congregations, Grace in East Trenton and St. Paul's in South Trenton. Both congregations began as missions of St. Michael's Church which provided financial support and the properties on which each congregation built its church. St. Paul's was organized in 1847 and became a parish in 1901. Grace began as a mission in 1875 and in 1896 became a parish. Suburban expansion provided the impetus for Grace to create new possibilities for ministry by deciding to relocate to Mercerville in 1946. During the transition period (October 1946 to November 1947) worship was held jointly with St. Paul's. From August 1947 to November 1949 worship was held at the Mercerville Firehouse. The church and parish hall were completed in November 1949. The parish hall was dedicated November 17 of that year to the memory of the first rector of Grace, the Rev. Milton A. Craft, whose devotion and leadership (1893 to 1935) forged a spiritual direction for many years and also made possible the establishment of two mission churches: St. Andrew's (1895) near Lawrence Township and St. Luke's (1913) in Ewing Township. The rectory was built in 1952. The congregations of both St. Paul's and Grace agreed to merge in 1955, and the present church was built. A 1600-pound bell in the tower of St. Paul's was removed and placed in the inner courtyard of the church complex.
