= USNS Grapple =

Rescue and salvage ship

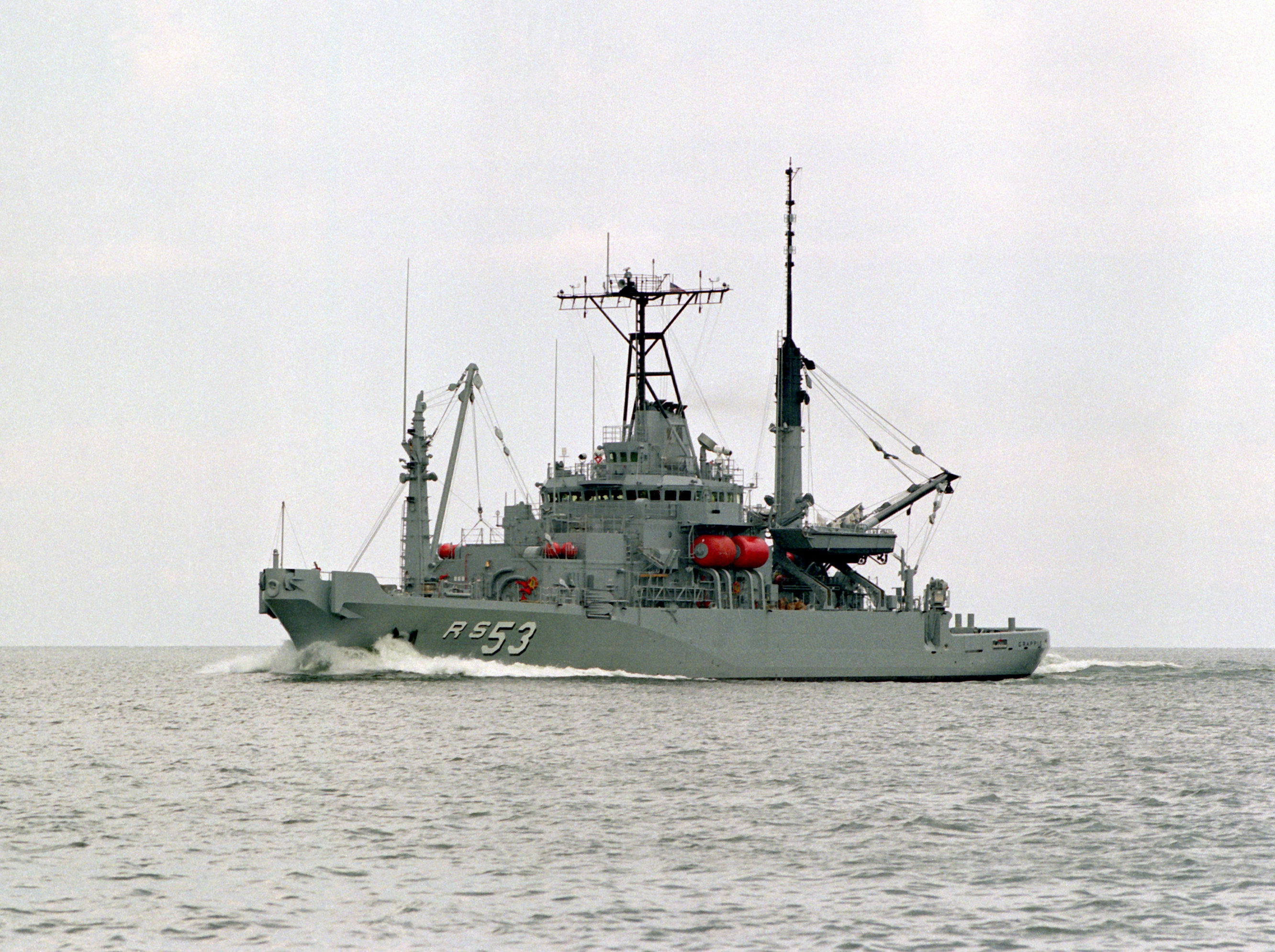
- USS Grapple (ARS-53)

History

United States
- Name: USS Grapple (ARS 53); USNS Grapple (T-ARS 53)
- Ordered: 29 October 1982
- Builder: Peterson Builders, Sturgeon Bay, Wisconsin
- Laid down: 25 April 1984
- Launched: 8 December 1984
- Commissioned: 15 November 1986
- Decommissioned: 13 July 2006
- In service: 14 July 2006
- Out of service: 1 October 2016
- Identification: Callsign: NGRP
- Motto: Ready to Serve
- Honours and awards: Marjorie Sterrett Battleship Fund Award (2000)
- Fate: Transferred to MSC NFAF 14 July 2006. Deactivated and placed in storage 1 October 2016
- Status: Deactivated
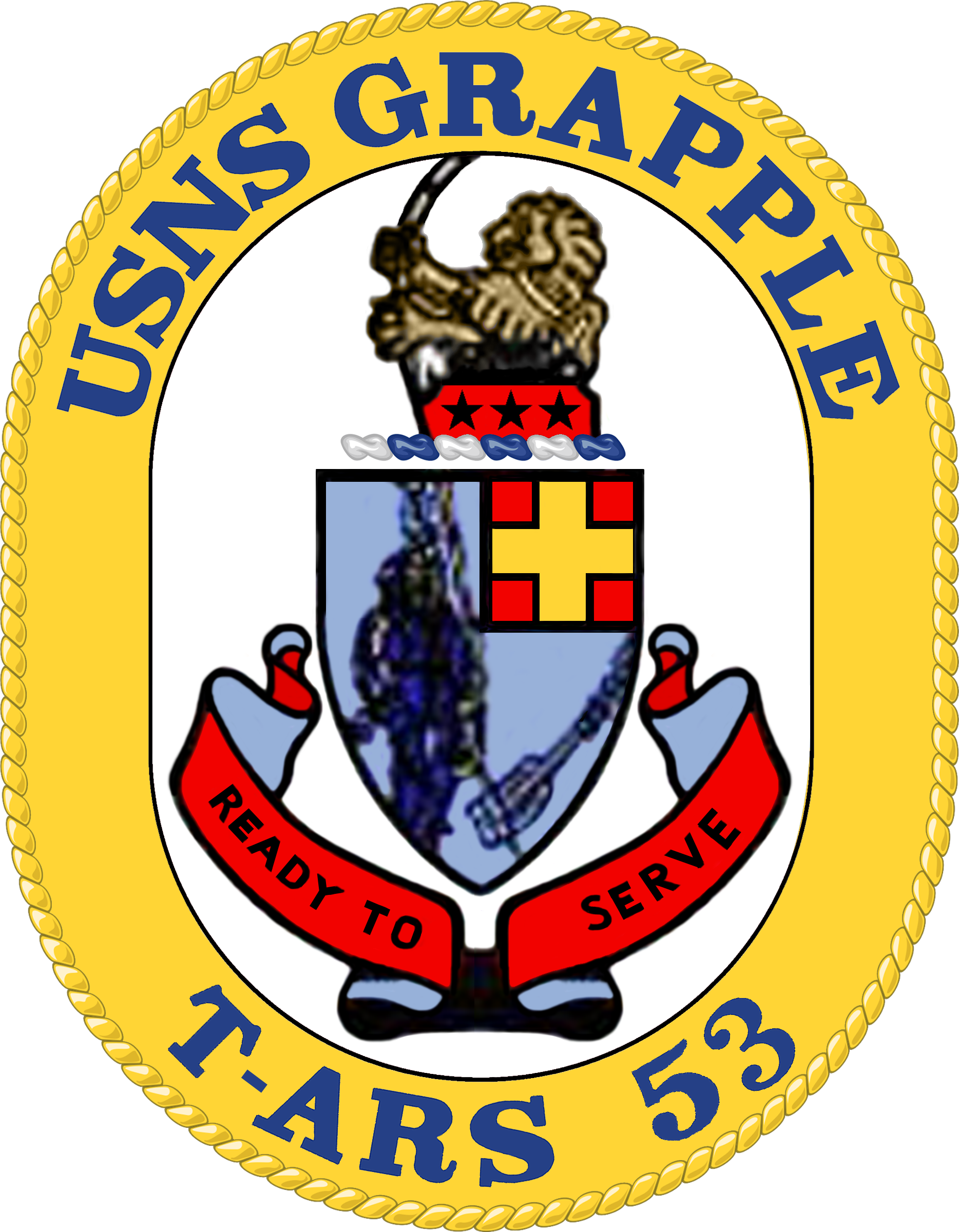
- Badge

General characteristics
- Class & type: Safeguard-class rescue and salvage ship
- Displacement: 2,633 long tons (2,675 t) light; 3,317 long tons (3,370 t) full load
- Length: 255 ft (78 m)
- Beam: 51 ft (16 m)
- Draft: 17 ft (5.2 m)
- Propulsion: 4 × Caterpillar 399 diesel engines
- Speed: 15 kn (28 km/h; 17 mph)
- Complement: 7 officers and 92 enlisted (USS); 4 military and 26 civilian (USNS)
- Armament: 2 × Mk 38 25 mm chain guns; 2 × 0.5 in (12.7 mm) machine guns

USS Grapple (ARS-53) is a Safeguard-class rescue and salvage ship in the United States Navy. Her home port is Norfolk, Virginia. On 13 July 2006 Grapple was decommissioned from US Navy service and converted to civilian operation by Military Sealift Command. She was redesignated as USNS Grapple (T-ARS 53).

== Role ==
Rescue and salvage ships render assistance to disabled ships, provide towing, salvage, diving, firefighting and heavy lift capabilities.

The mission of the rescue and salvage ships is fourfold: to debeach stranded vessels, heavy lift capability from ocean depths, towing of other vessels, and crewed diving operations. For rescue missions, these ships are equipped with fire monitors forward and amidships which can deliver either firefighting foam or sea water. The salvage holds of these ships are outfitted with portable equipment to provide assistance to other vessels in dewatering, patching, supply of electrical power and other essential service required to return a disabled ship to an operating condition.

The Navy has responsibility for salvaging U.S. government-owned ships and privately owned vessels. The rugged construction of these steel-hulled ships, combined with speed and endurance, make these rescue and salvage ships well-suited for operations of Navy and commercial shipping. The versatility of this class of ship enables the U.S. Navy to render assistance to those in peril on the high seas.

== Capabilities ==
Grapple is designed to perform combat salvage, lifting, towing, off-ship firefighting, crewed diving operations, and emergency repairs to stranded or disabled vessels.

=== Salvage of disabled and stranded vessels ===
Disabled or stranded ships might require various types of assistance before retraction or towing can be attempted. In her 21,000 cubic feet (590 m^{3}) salvage hold, Grapple carries transportable cutting and welding equipment, hydraulic and electric power sources, and de-watering gear. Grapple also has salvage and machine shops, and hull repair materials to effect temporary hull repairs on stranded or otherwise damaged ships.

=== Retraction of stranded vessels ===
Stranded vessels can be retracted from a beach or reef by the use of Grapple's towing machine and propulsion. Additional retraction force can be applied to a stranded vessel through the use of up to six legs of beach gear, consisting of 6,000-pound (2,700 kg) STATO anchors, wire rope, chain, and salvage buoys. In a typical configuration, two legs of beach gear are rigged on board Grapple, and up to four legs of beach are rigged to the stranded vessel.

In addition to the standard legs of beach gear, Grapple carries 4 spring buoys. The spring buoys are carried beneath the port and starboard bridge wings. Each spring buoy weighs approximately 3,100 pounds (1,400 kg), is 10 feet (3.0 m) long and 6 feet (1.8 m) in diameter, provides a net buoyancy of 7½ tons, and can withstand 125 tons of pull-through force. The spring buoys are used with beach gear legs rigged from a stranded vessel when deep water is found seaward of the stranded vessel.

=== Towing ===
Grapple's propulsion machinery provides a bollard pull (towing force at zero speed and full power) of 68 tons.

The centerpiece of Grapple's towing capability is an Almon A. Johnson Series 322 double-drum automatic towing machine. Each drum carries 3,000 feet (910 m) of 2.25-inch-diameter (57 mm) drawn galvanized, 6×37 right-hand lay, wire-rope towing hawsers, with closed zinc-poured sockets on the bitter end. The towing machine uses a system to automatically pay in and pay out the towing howser to maintain a constant strain.

The automatic towing machine also includes a Series 400 traction winch that can be used with synthetic line towing hawsers up to 14 inches in circumference. The traction winch has automatic payout but only manual recovery.

The Grapple's caprail is curved to fairlead and prevent chafing of the towing hawser. It includes two vertical stern rollers to tend the towing hawser directly aft and two Norman pin rollers to prevent the towing hawser from sweeping forward of the beam at the point of tow. The stern rollers and Norman pins are raised hydraulically and can withstand a lateral force of 50,000 pounds (23,000 kg) at mid barrel.

Two tow bows provide a safe working area on the fantail during towing operations.

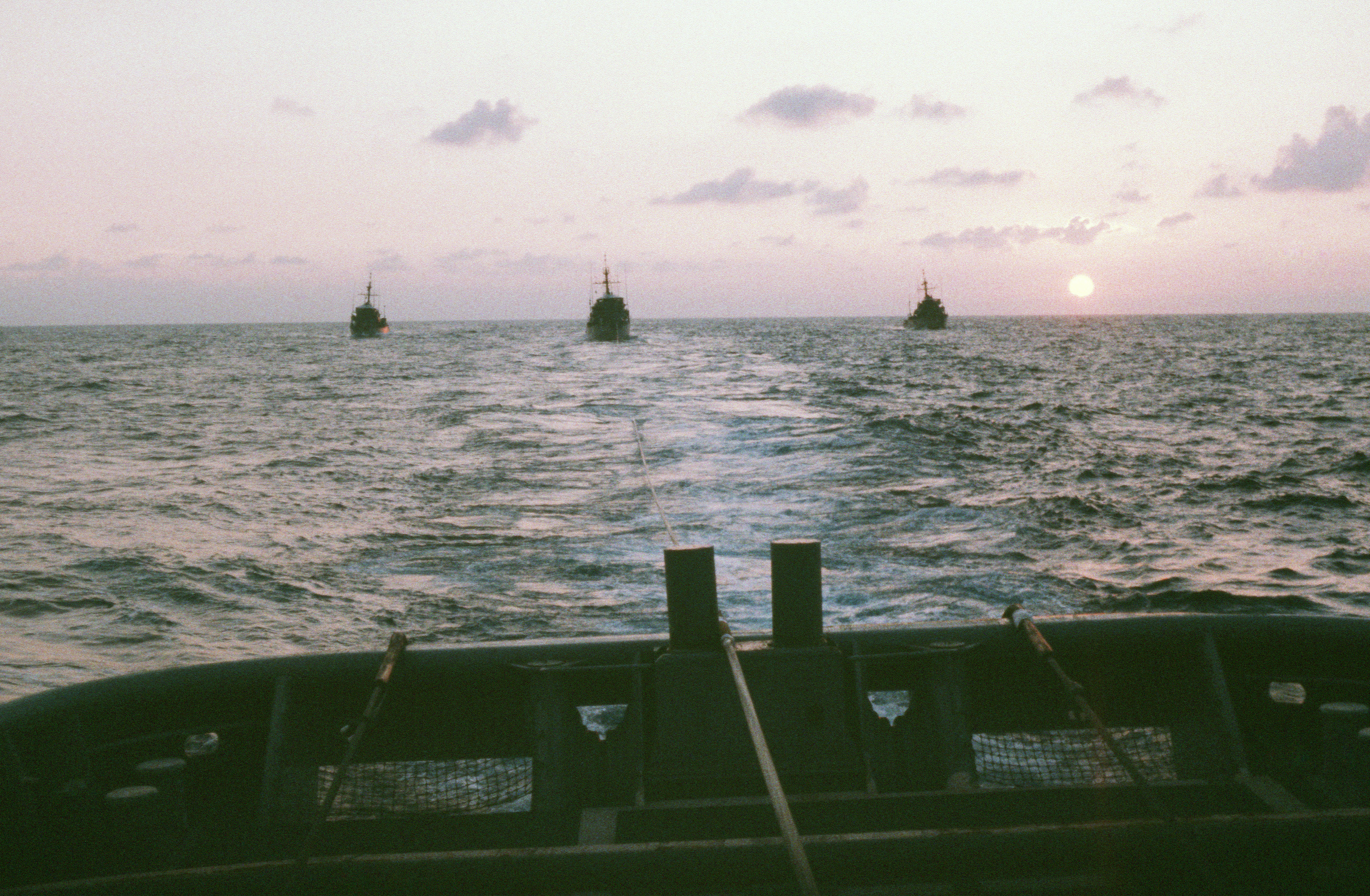
Grapple tows Inflict, Fearless and Illusive

USS Inflict (MSO-456), Fearless (MSO-442) and Illusive (MSO-448) were towed to the Gulf of Oman by USS Grapple (ARS-53), which departed Little Creek, Virginia on 6 September 1987. They traveled via the Suez Canal and arrived in the Gulf of Oman on 2 November 1987. At the time, the 9,000-nautical-mile (17,000 km) trip was the longest distance three ships were towed by one.

=== Crewed diving operations ===
Grapple has several diving systems to support different types of operations. Divers descend to diving depth on a diving stage that is lowered by one of two powered davits.

The diving locker is equipped with a double-lock hyperbaric chamber for recompression after deep dives or for the treatment of divers suffering from decompression sickness.

The MK21 MOD1 diving system supports crewed diving to depths of 190 feet (58 m) on surface-supplied air. A fly-away mixed gas system can be used to enable the support of diving to a maximum depth of 300 feet (91 m).

The MK20 MOD0 diving system allows-surface supplied diving to a depth of 60 feet (18 m) with lighter equipment.

Grapple carries SCUBA equipment for dives that require greater mobility than is possible in tethered diving.

=== Recovery of submerged objects ===
In addition to her two main ground tackle anchors (6,000-pound (2,700 kg) Navy standard stockless or 8,000-pound (3,600 kg) balanced-fluke anchors) Grapple can use equipment associated with her beach gear to lay a multi-point open water moor to station herself for diving and ROV operations.

A typical four-point-moor consists of an X pattern with four Stato Anchors at the outside corners and Grapple at the center, made fast to a spring buoy for the close end of each mooring leg with synthetic mooring lines. Using her capstans, Grapple can shorten or lengthen the mooring line for each leg and change her position within the moor.

Grapple has a 7.5-ton-capacity boom on her forward kingpost and a 40-ton-capacity boom on her aft kingpost.

=== Heavy lift ===
One of the cranes used on Grapple for heavy lifting transferring a piece of the wreckage of TWA Flight 800 to a utility craft, 2 August 1996

Grapple has heavy lift system that consists of large bow and stern rollers, deck machinery, and tackle. The rollers serve as low-friction fairlead for the wire rope or chain used for the lift. The tackle and deck machinery provide up to 75 tons of hauling for each lift. The two bow rollers can be used together with linear hydraulic pullers to achieve a dynamic lift of 150 tons. The stern rollers can be used with the automatic towing machine to provide a dynamic lift of 150 tons. All four rollers can be used together for a dynamic lift of 300 tons or a static tidal lift of 350 tons.

Grapple also has two auxiliary bow rollers, which can support a 75-ton lift when used together.

=== Off-ship fire-fighting ===
Grapple has three manually operated fire monitors, one on the forward signal bridge, one on the aft signal bridge, and one on the forecastle, that can deliver up to 1,000 gallons per minute of seawater or aqueous film forming foam (AFFF) When originally built, Grapple had a fourth remotely controlled fire monitor mounted on her forward kingpost, but this was later removed. Grapple has a 3,600 gallon foam tank.

=== Emergency ship salvage material ===
In addition to the equipment carried by Grapple, the US Navy Supervisor of Salvage maintains a stock of additional emergency fly-away salvage equipment that can be deployed aboard the salvage ships to support a wide variety of rescue and salvage operations.

== Awards ==
In 2000, Grapple won the Marjorie Sterrett Battleship Fund Award for the Atlantic Fleet.

== Operations ==
=== Bodo, Norway ===
In September 1988, LST-1190 USS Boulder ran aground on a shoal in a Norwegian fjord during Exercise: Teamwork. The Grapple, along with two Norwegian tugs, removed Boulder from the shoal. As of February 2019, Grapple is berthed behind Boulder and three Charleston-class vessels.

=== Adriatic Sea (F-16 recovery) ===
The Grapple also helped to recover an F-16C which had crashed in the Adriatic Sea in 2013, killing its pilot.

=== Botwood Harbor, Newfoundland, Canada ===
In July 2014, Grapple was in Newfoundland's Botwood Harbor for the body recovery from a 1940s plane wreck.

=== Corsica (Calvi) ===
In October 2012, Grapple supported research operation diving on a sea landing B-17 in WWII.

=== Atlantic Ocean, 100km (62 miles) south of Nantucket ===
In November 1999, Grapple participated in the salvage operation of EgyptAir Flight 990.

=== St. Margarets Bay, Nova Scotia, Canada ===
In September 1998, Grapple helped in the recovery of Swissair Flight 111.

=== Mediterranean Sea ===
In January 2010, Grapple assisted in the search and recovery of aircraft fuselage pieces and "black-box" flight recorders following the crash of Ethiopian Airlines Flight 409.

== Status ==
Grapple was placed in "Out of Service, in Reserve" status on October 1, 2016, and is stored at the Naval Inactive Ship Maintenance Facility in Philadelphia, Pennsylvania.

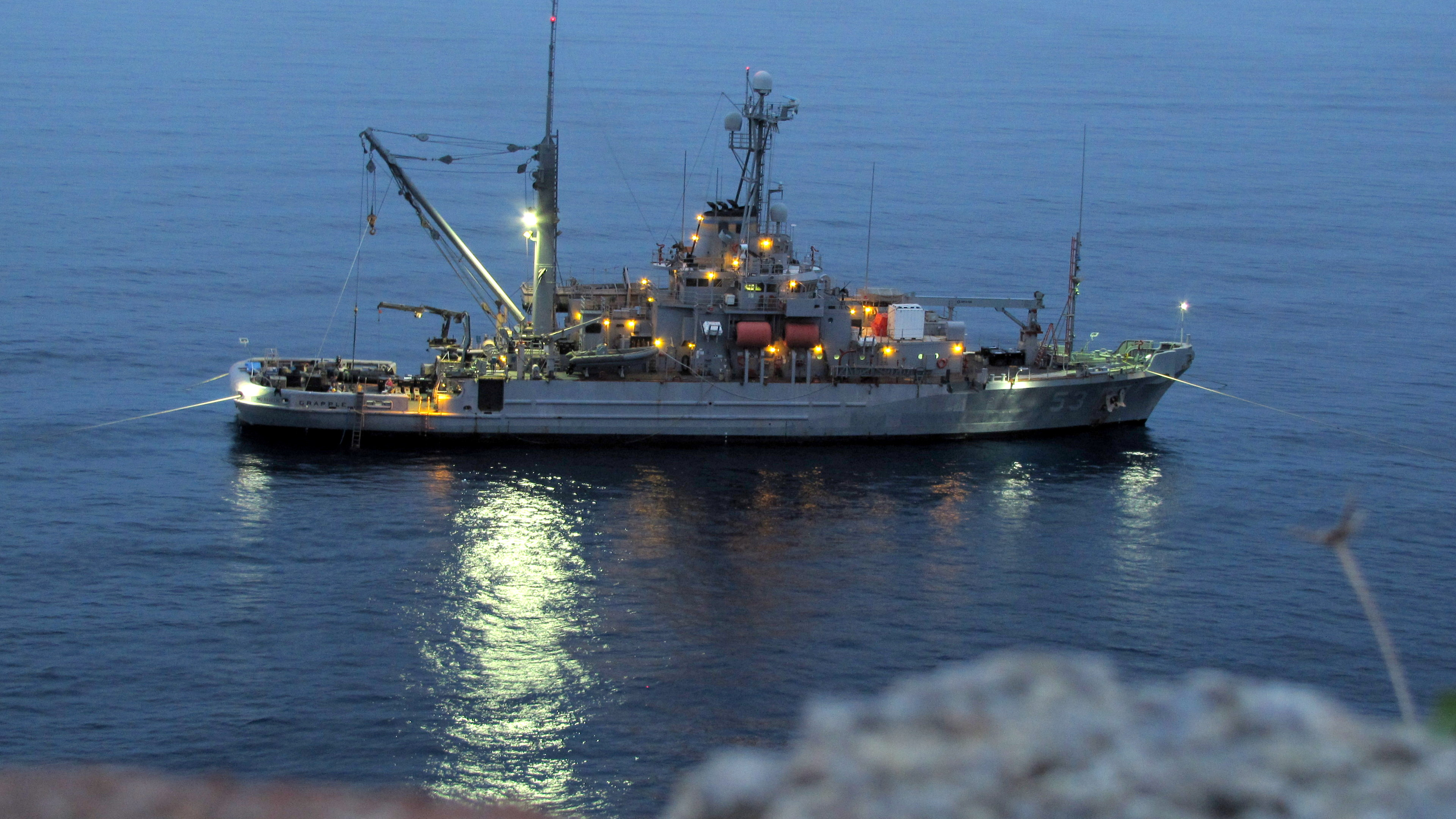
USS Grapple - Calvi (Corsica - October 2012)

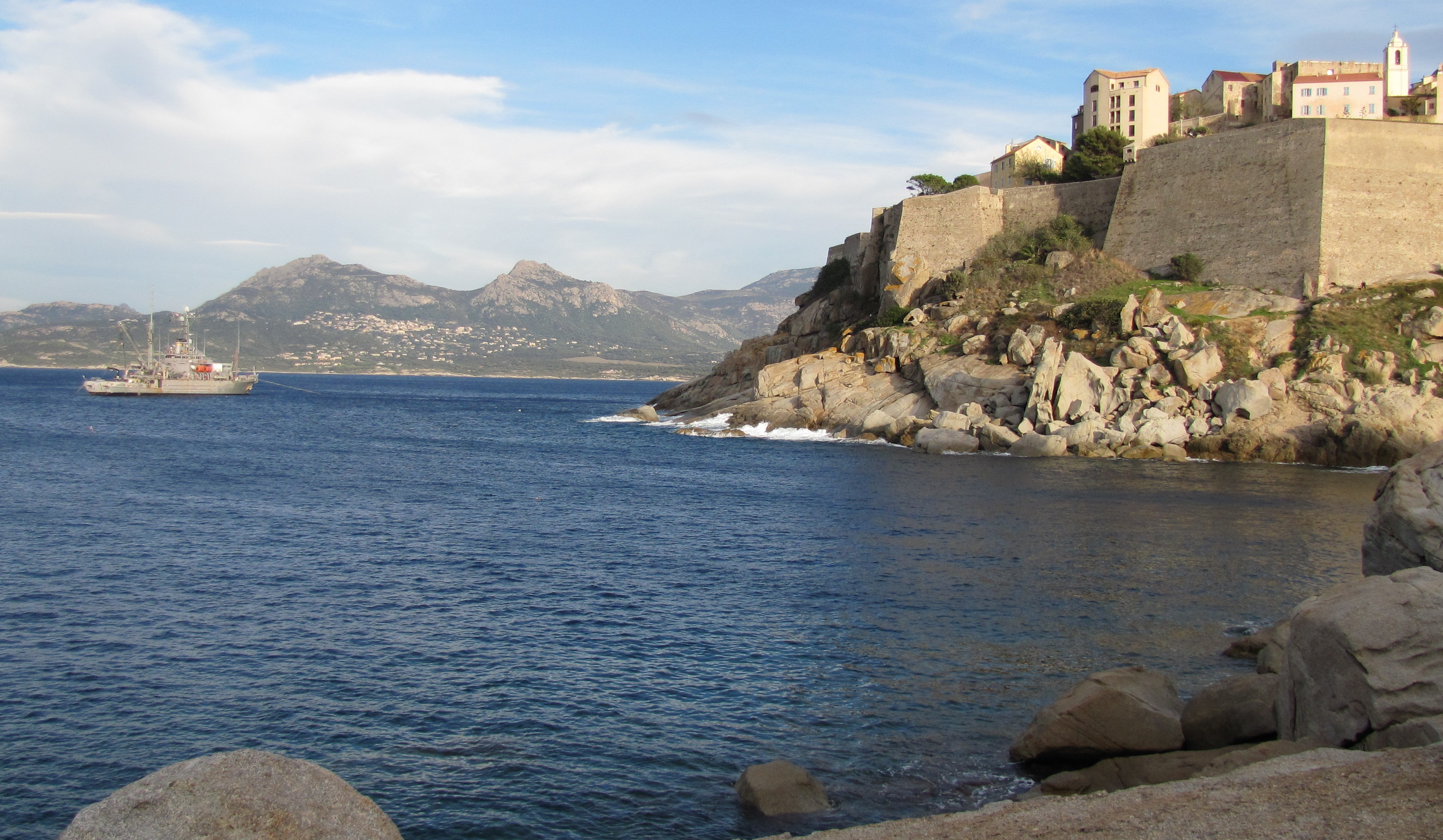
USS Grapple - Calvi (Corsica - October 2012)

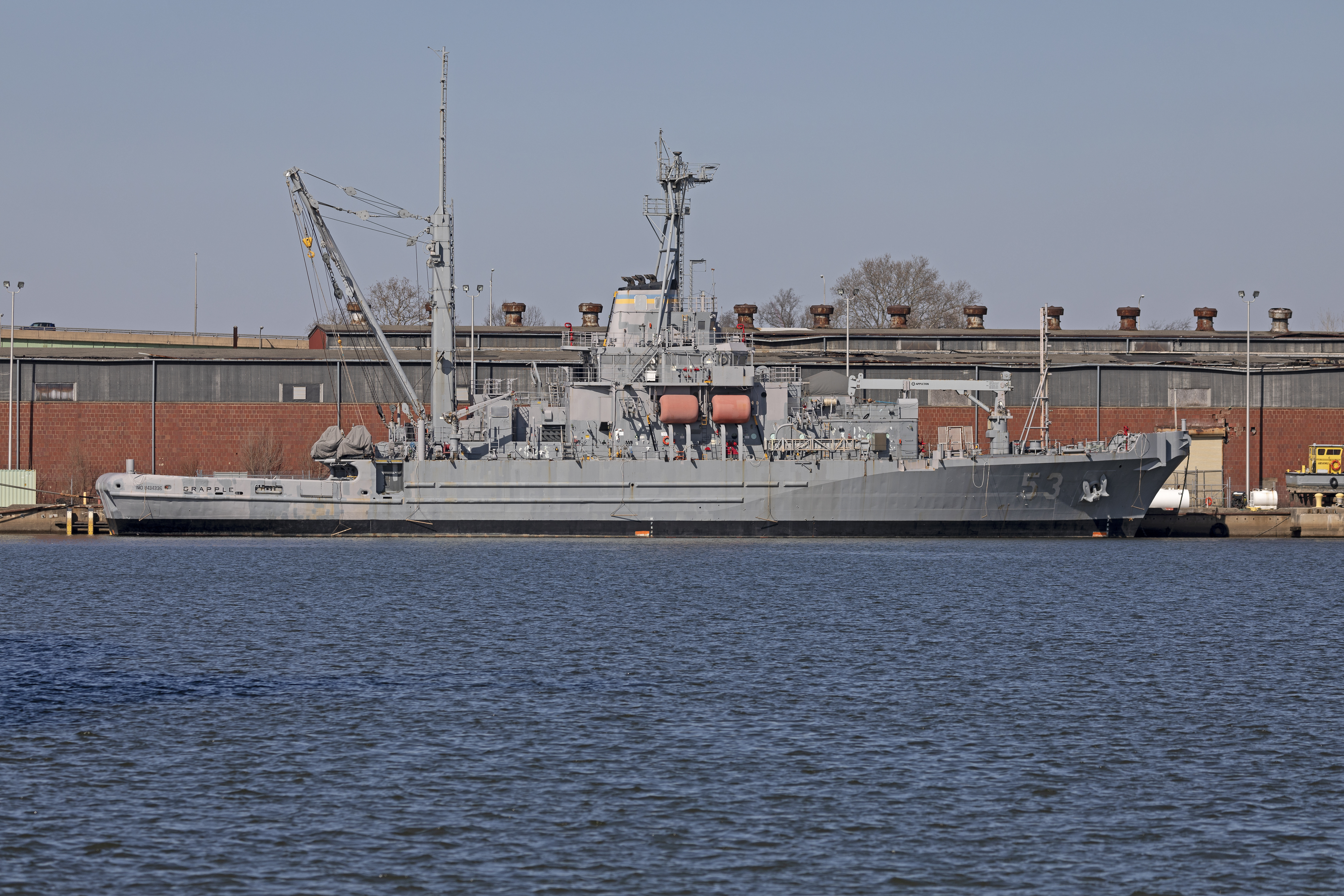
The former USS Grapple sits in mothballs at the Philadelphia Navy Yard - February 16, 2019.
