= USNS Salvor =

Safeguard-class rescue and salvage ship

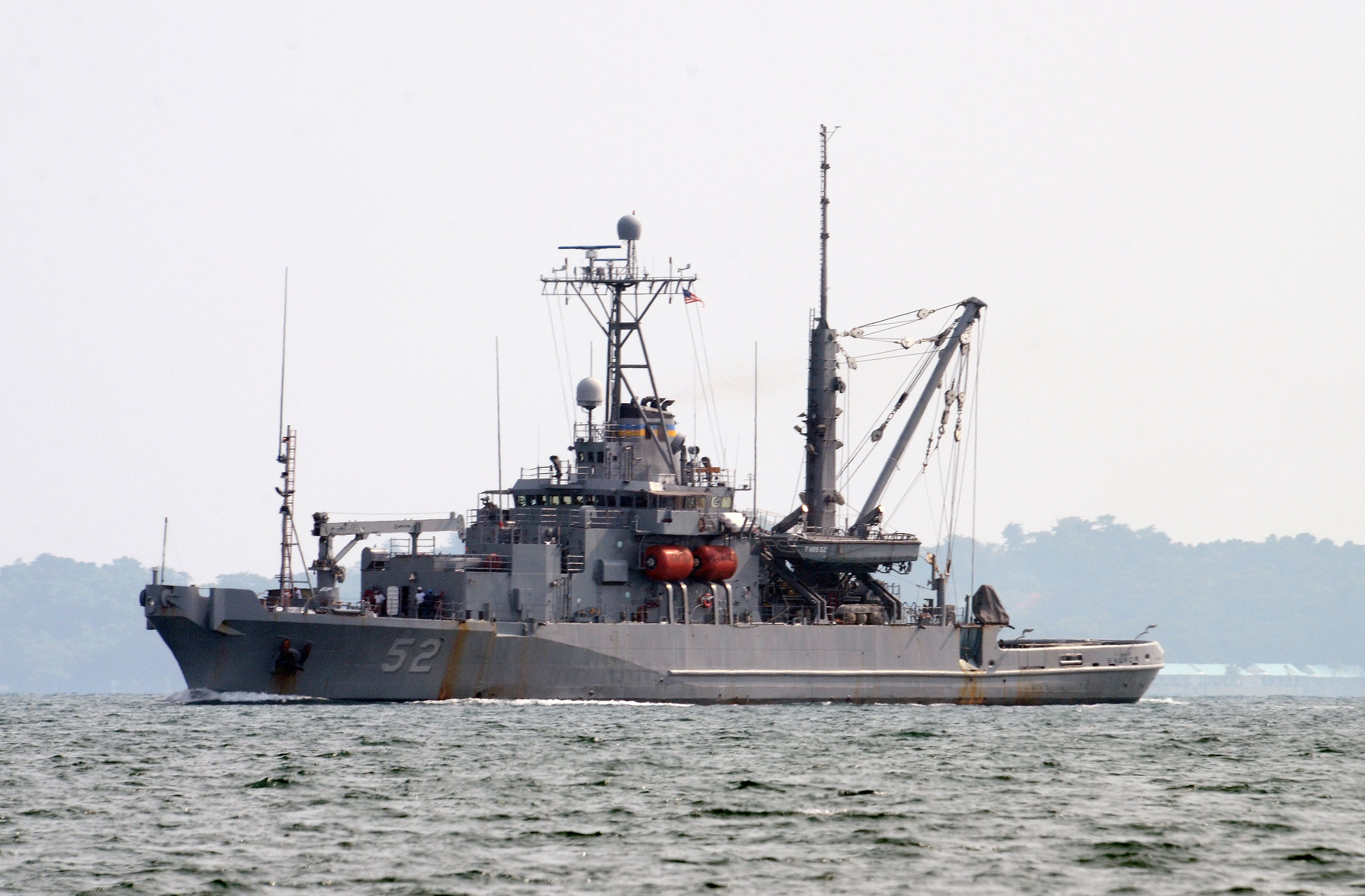
- USNS Salvor (ARS-52) in Subic Bay, June 2013

History

United States
- Name: Salvor
- Awarded: 11 February 1982
- Builder: Peterson Builders, Sturgeon Bay, Wisconsin
- Laid down: 16 September 1983
- Launched: 28 July 1984
- Commissioned: 14 June 1986
- Decommissioned: 12 January 2007
- Fate: Transferred to Military Sealift Command
- In service: 12 January 2007
- Home port: Pearl Harbor
- Identification: Call sign: NLNB; IMO number: 8434374; MMSI number: 369901000
- Motto: Veritas Ut Eius Nominis; ("Truth is in his name")
- Status: In active service
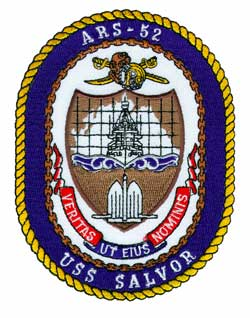
- Badge: Crest of USS Salvor

General characteristics
- Class & type: Safeguard-class rescue and salvage ship
- Displacement: 3,282 long tons (3,335 t) full
- Length: 255 ft (78 m) o/a
- Beam: 51 ft (16 m)
- Draft: 16 ft 9 in (5.11 m)
- Propulsion: 4 × Caterpillar 399 diesel engines; 4,200 shp (3.1 MW); 2 × shafts and controllable-pitch propellers
- Speed: 15 knots (28 km/h; 17 mph)
- Complement: Civilian crew
- Armament: 2 × Mk 38 25 mm chain guns; 2 × 0.5 in (12.7 mm) machine guns

USNS Salvor (T-ARS-52) is a Safeguard-class rescue and salvage ship, the second United States Navy ship of that name.

Salvor was laid down on 16 September 1983 by Peterson Builders, Sturgeon Bay, Wisconsin; launched on 28 July 1984; and commissioned on 14 June 1986.

Salvor is the third ship of the auxiliary rescue and salvage class of vessel constructed for the US Navy. The rugged construction of this steel-hulled vessel, combined with her speed and endurance, make Salvor well-suited for rescue and salvage operations throughout the world. The hull below the waterline is ice-strengthened. Her propulsion plant can develop 4200 shaft horsepower with four Caterpillar 399 diesel engines coupled in pairs to two shafts. She is fitted with a Controllable Reversible Pitch (CRP) propeller within a Kort nozzle on each shaft. The CRP propeller/Kort nozzle combination produces greater thrust and more maneuverability control than conventional propellers. Salvor is also configured with a bow thruster which provides athwartship thrust for additional control of the bow when the ship's speed is less than five knots (9 km/h).

In 1995 and again in 2000, Salvor was the United States Pacific Fleet's winner of the Marjorie Sterrett Battleship Fund Award for most battle-ready ship of her type.

USS Salvor was decommissioned and transferred to the Military Sealift Command in January 2007. Salvor was redesignated as USNS Salvor (T-ARS 52). The ship has undergone modifications for civilian crewing as well as automation and control system upgrades at Puget Sound Naval Shipyard.

== Mission and capabilities ==
Like all Safeguard-class rescue and salvage ships, Salvor serves as an element of the United States Navy's Combat Logistics Support Force and provides rescue and salvage services to the fleet at sea. She also supported the protection of forces ashore through post-assault salvage operations in close proximity to the shore. She is designed to perform combat salvage, lifting, towing, off-ship firefighting, manned diving operations, and emergency repairs to stranded or disabled vessels.

=== Salvage of disabled and stranded vessels ===
Disabled or stranded ships might require various types of assistance before retraction or towing can be attempted. In her 21,000 cubic feet (590 m^{3}) salvage holds, Salvor carries transportable cutting and welding equipment, hydraulic and electric power sources, and de-watering gear. Salvor also has salvage and machine shops, and hull repair materials to effect temporary hull repairs on stranded or otherwise damaged ships.

=== Retraction of stranded vessels ===
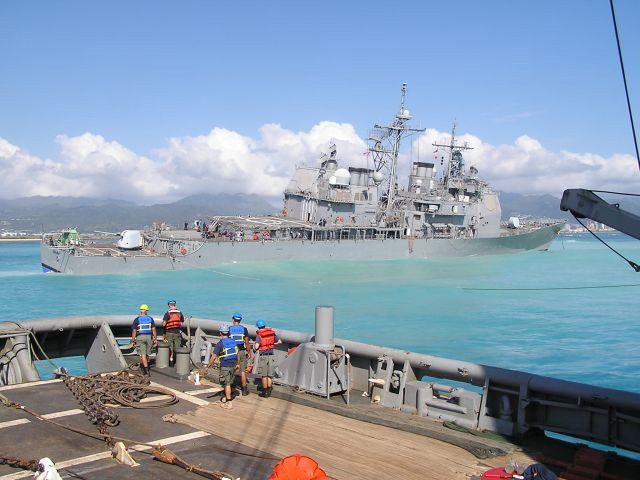
Salvor and other ships towed the grounded USS Port Royal off a reef near Pearl Harbor, Hawaii in February 2009.

Stranded vessels can be retracted from a beach or reef by the use of Salvor's towing machine and propulsion. Additional retraction force can be applied to a stranded vessel through the use of up to six legs of beach gear, consisting of 6,000-pound (2,700 kg) STATO anchors, wire rope, chain, and salvage buoys. In a typical configuration, two legs of beach gear are rigged on board Salvor, and up to four legs of beach are rigged to the stranded vessel.

In addition to the standard legs of beach gear, Salvor carries four spring buoys. The spring buoys are carried beneath the port and starboard bridge wings and are painted bright orange. Each spring buoy weighs approximately 3,100 pounds (1,400 kg), is 10 feet (3.0 m) long and 6 feet (1.8 m) in diameter, provides a net buoyancy of 7½ tons, and can withstand 125 tons of pull-through force. The spring buoys are used with beach gear legs rigged from a stranded vessel when deep water is found seaward of the stranded vessel.

=== Towing ===
Ocean Towing Operations as USS Salvor
Vessel	Location	Date
AFDB 1B, AFDB 2E (floating dry docks)	Subic Bay, Philippines to Pearl Harbor Hawaii (ADFB 1B) passed to USS Brunswick	November- December 1987.
Ex-USS Hector	Pearl Harbor operating areas (synthetic line experiment)	May 1989.
USS Conquest	Pearl Harbor, Hawaii to Kwajelein to Subic Bay, Philippines	September–October 1987.
Ex-Hyannis, ex-USS Tunica, ex-USS Navigator, ex-USS Tenino	Charleston, South Carolina (YTB-817 only) to Beaumont, Texas (all) to Panama Canal to San Diego, California (all except ex-Tenino) to Pearl Harbor, Hawaii	August–November 1986
Ex-USS Coucal	Pearl Harbor Hawaii to SINKEX	April 1990.
AFDL 40 (floating dry dock)	Pearl Harbor, Hawaii to Kwajelein to Guam to Subic Bay, Philippines	June 1991.
Ex-USS Cochrane	Yokosuka, Japan to Midway to Pearl Harbor, Hawaii	June 1991.
Ex-USS Vancouver	San Diego, CA to Pearl Harbor, Hawaii	April 1992.
Ex-USS Flasher	Pearl Harbor, Hawaii to Bremerton Washington	September 1992.
USS Cimarron	Hawaii operating areas to Pearl Harbor, Hawaii	March 1993.
Ex-USS Haddock	Pearl Harbor, Hawaii to Bremerton Washington	May 1993.
Ex-USS Triton	Rodman, Panama to Bremerton, Washington	August 1993.
Ex-USS Peoria	San Diego, California to Pearl Harbor, Hawaii	1994
Ex-USS Tuscaloosa	San Diego, California to Pearl Harbor, Hawaii	1994
Ex-USS Woodrow Wilson	Rodman, Panama to San Diego to Bremerton, Washington	September 1994.
Ex-USS Richard B. Russell	San Francisco, California to Bremerton, Washington	October 1994.
Ex-USS Silversides	Pearl Harbor, Hawaii to Bremerton Washington	June 1995.
Ex-USS Stoddard	Pearl Harbor, Hawaii to SINKEX	August 1997.
Ex-USCGC Basswood	Pearl Harbor, Hawaii to San Francisco, California	March 1999.
Decommissioned Submarine	Pearl Harbor, Hawaii to Bremerton, Washington	July 2000.
Ex-USS Pyro	Bremerton Washington to San Francisco, California	August 2000.
Ex-USS Okinawa	San Francisco California to Bremerton, Washington	August 2000.
Ex-USNS Wyman	Pearl Harbor, Hawaii to San Francisco, California	March 2001.
YDT 253 barge crane	San Diego, California to Bremerton, Washington	August 2003.
Ex-USS John Young	San Francisco, California to Pearl Harbor Hawaii	September 2003.
Ex-USS O'Brien	Pearl Harbor, Hawaii to SINKEX	February 2006.
USCGC Yocona (ex-USS Seize)	Pearl Harbor, Hawaii to Guam	October 2006.

Salvor's propulsion machinery provides a bollard pull (towing force at zero speed and full power) of 68 tons.

The centerpiece of Salvor's towing capability is an Almon A. Johnson Series 322 double-drum automatic towing machine. Each drum carries 3,000 feet (910 m) of 2 1/4-inch-diameter (57 mm) drawn galvanized, 6X37 right-hand lay, wire-rope towing hawsers, with closed zinc-poured sockets on the bitter end. The towing machine uses a system to automatically pay-in and pay-out the towing hawser to maintain a constant strain.

The automatic towing machine also includes a Series 400 traction winch that can be used with synthetic line towing hawsers up to 14 inches in circumference. The winch has automatic payout but only manual recovery.

The Salvor's caprail is curved to fairlead and prevent chafing of the towing hawser. It includes two vertical stern rollers to tend the towing hawser directly aft and two Norman pin rollers to prevent the towing hawser from sweeping forward of the beam at the point of tow. The stern rollers and Norman pins are raised hydraulically and can withstand a lateral force of 50,000 pounds (23,000 kg) at mid barrel.

Two tow bows provide a safe working area on the fantail during towing operations.

=== Manned diving operations ===
Salvor has several diving systems to support different types of operations. Divers descend to diving depth on a diving stage that is lowered by one of two powered davits.

The diving locker is equipped with a double-lock hyperbaric chamber that can be used for recompression after deep dives or for the treatment of divers suffering from decompression sickness.

The MK21 MOD1 diving system supports manned diving to depths of 190 feet (58 m) on surfaced-supplied air. A fly-away mixed gas system can be used to enable the support of diving to a maximum depth of 300 feet (91 m).

The MK20 MOD0 diving system allows-surface supplied diving to a depth of 60 feet (18 m) with lighter equipment.

Salvor carries SCUBA equipment for dives that require greater mobility than is possible in tethered diving.

=== Mines ===
Naval mine laying and recovery.

=== Recovery of submerged objects ===
In addition to her two main ground tackle anchors (6,000-pound (2,700 kg) Navy standard stockless or 8,000-pound (3,600 kg) balanced-fluke anchors) Salvor can use equipment associated with her beach gear to lay a multi-point open water moor to station herself for diving and ROV operations.

A typical four-point-moor consists of an X pattern with four Stato Anchors at the outside corners and Salvor at the center, made fast to a spring buoy for the close end of each mooring leg with synthetic mooring lines. Using her capstans, Salvor can shorten or lengthen the mooring line for each leg and change her position within the moor.

As built, Salvor had a 7.5-ton capacity boom on a forward kingpost. However, the kingpost and boom were removed and replaced by a 10,000-pound deck crane in 2011. She has 40-ton capacity boom on her aft kingpost.

=== Heavy Lift ===
Salvor has heavy lift system that consists of large bow and stern rollers, deck machinery, and tackle. The rollers serve as low-friction fairlead for the wire rope or chain used for the lift. The tackle and deck machinery provide up to 75 tons of hauling for each lift. The two bow rollers can be used together with linear hydraulic pullers to achieve a dynamic lift of 150 tons. The stern rollers can be used with the automatic towing machine to provide a dynamic lift of 150 tons. All four rollers can be used together for a dynamic lift of 300 tons or a static tidal lift of 350 tons.

Salvor also has two auxiliary bow rollers, which can support of 75 ton lift when used together.

=== Off-ship fire-fighting ===
Salvor has three manually operated fire monitors, one on the forward signal bridge, one on the aft signal bridge, and one on the forecastle, that can deliver up to 1000 gallons per minute of seawater or aqueous film forming foam (AFFF). When originally built, Salvor had a fourth remotely controlled fire monitor mounted on her forward kingpost, but this was later removed. Salvor has a 3600-gallon foam tank.

=== Emergency ship salvage material ===
In addition to the equipment carried by Salvor, the US Navy Supervisor of Salvage maintains a stock of additional emergency fly-away salvage equipment that can be deployed aboard the salvage ships to support a wide variety of rescue and salvage operations.

== Operational accomplishments ==
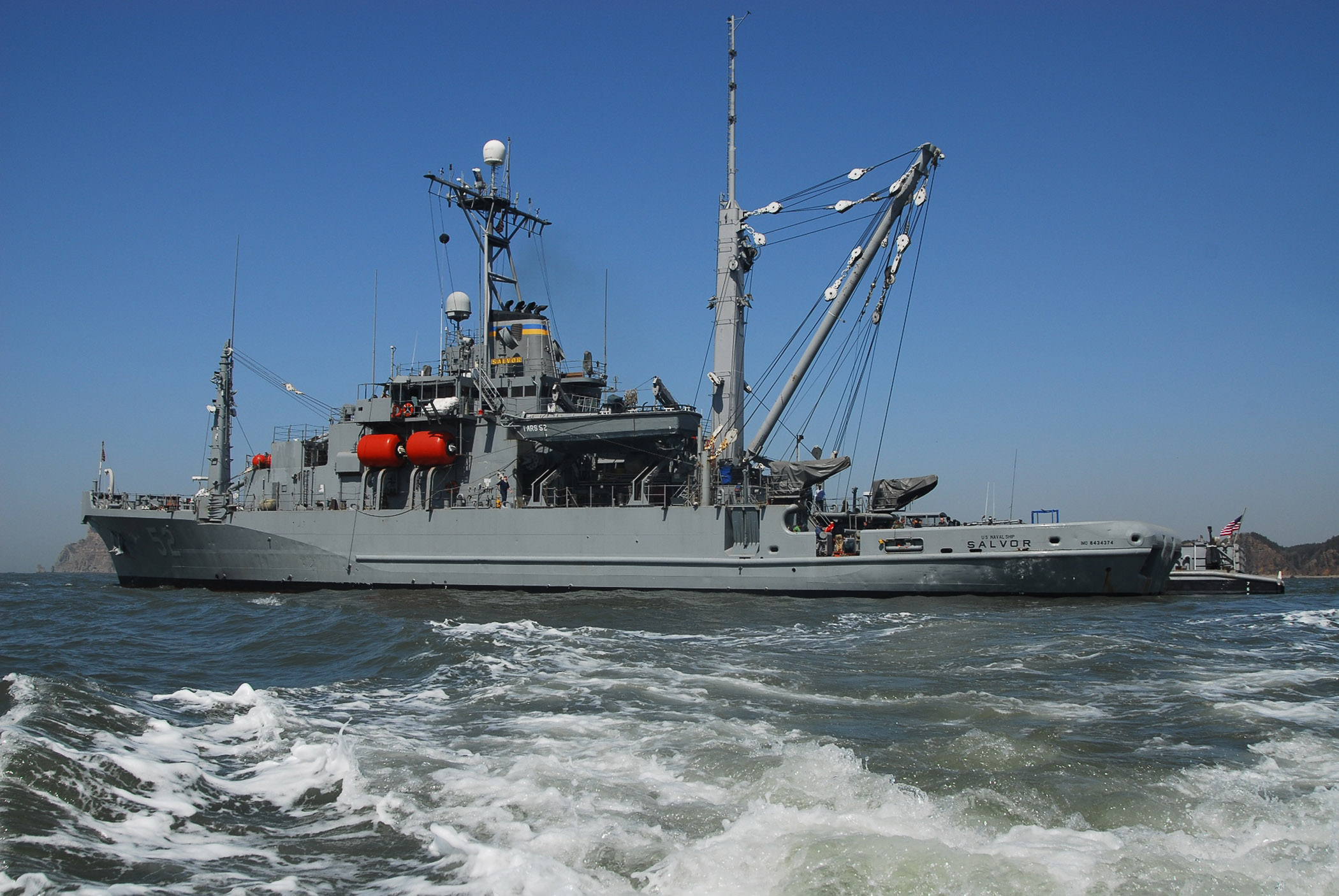
Assisting search and rescue efforts after the sinking of ROKS Cheonan

Between 1987 and 2001, Salvor has provided rescue or assistance to ships at sea in seven instances. Two cases involved collisions near Hawaii: the USNS Safeguard boat accident in August 1987, and the collision of USS Greeneville with Ehime Maru in February 2001. Salvor also assisted in the Exxon Houston grounding near Barbers Point, Hawaii, in March 1989, and the Kamalu barge fire in May 1989. On three occasions, Salvor has assisted a ship at sea that has suffered a catastrophic equipment loss: recovering the primary towing pendant of the ex-USS Duncan/USNS Navajo in January 1995, the anchor chain of the USS Willamette in February 1995, and the towed sonar array of the USS Los Angeles in June 1996. The ship was also involved in the rescue effort after the sinking of ROKS Cheonan.

During the same time, Salvor participated in seven sea-recoveries of submerged military aircraft, including an A-6E Intruder (VA-145) in Puget Sound, Washington, a UH-46D Sea Knight from a world-record depth of 17,251 feet (5,258 m) near Wake Island, a SH-60 Seahawk, an F/A-18C Hornet (VFA-22) near San Diego, and two United States Air Force F-16 Falcons in Korean waters and the Sea of Japan.

Other salvage operations undertaken by Salvor include repairing the propeller blades of HMAS Darwin, repairing the hull of BRP Rajah Humabon, recovering a LARC-V amphibious vehicle, recovering and disposing of a 1,000-pound (450 kg) Mark 83 bomb, pumping out oil leaking from the wreck of USS Mississinewa, and exploring the wreck of the USS Lagarto in the Gulf of Thailand.

== Operational history as USS Salvor ==
=== Maiden voyage ===
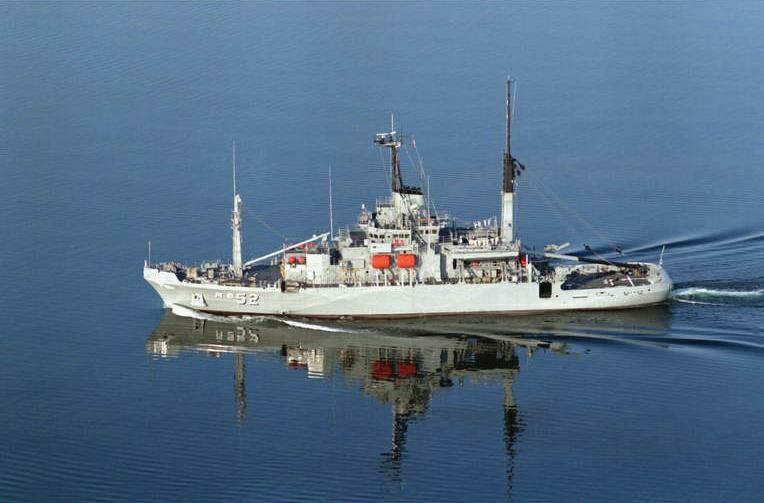
Official US Navy photo of USS Salvor in early configuration.

Salvor departed Sturgeon Bay, Wisconsin on her first voyage on 25 July 1986. She visited Sault Ste Marie, Michigan, before conducting diving operations for certification in Lake Superior. During the first part of August she made stops in Toronto, Quebec, and Halifax. After departing Halifax, she was diverted to New York City because of Hurricane Charley. She arrived at Little Creek, Virginia and 21 August 1986 and received her ammunition loadout. Her next stop was Charleston, South Carolina, where she took a single navy harbor tug (ex-Hyannis) in tow.

Salvor arrived at Beaumont, Texas, on 4 September where she had to wait out Tropical Storm Danielle for several days before she was able to get underway and take three additional vessels, two World War II vintage auxiliary tugs (ex-Navigator and ex-Tunica), and an auxiliary fleet tug (ex-Tenino), in tow at the mouth of the Sabine River. From there, Salvor towed the four vessels in a "Christmas tree" rig to Christobol, Panama, arriving on 21 September. Salvor transited the canal, and re-rigged her tows again in Rodman, Panama and departed for San Diego, California on 26 September. Upon arrival off San Diego, Salvor passed ex-Tenino to a commercial tug for delivery to Port Hueneme, California. After a brief stop at San Diego, Salvor continued with the remaining three towed vessels (ex-Hyannis, ex-Navigator, and ex-Tunica) and arrived at her home port of Pearl Harbor for the first time on 1 November.

Salvor spent the remainder of 1986 in or around Pearl Harbor, conducting training, validations, and trials.

=== Training and local operations ===
After holiday upkeep, Salvor began 1987 with an underway shakedown cruise. During the shakedown cruise, Salvor and USS Reclaimer collided during tow and be towed exercises. The collision caused only minor damage and no injuries. Following shakedown training, Salvor conducted diving operations from 26 to 30 January.

Salvor devoted February 1987 to a full power run, a VERTREP, target towing for Tactical Fighter Wing 419, HMCS Kootenay, and HMCS Terra Nova. Along with USS Skate, she supported SEAL operations from 17 to 20 February.

During early March, Salvor Conducted a de-beaching exercise with the salvage training hulk ex-Buckeye, a bow lift exercise with a mud monster. Salvor then entered a series of maintenance availabilities and in-port training exercises, followed by more local operations including target towing for USS Whipple, support of submarine operations near Kauai, search and rescue operations for a USS Safeguard boating accident, and off-ship firefighting training with ex-Buckeye.

=== First Western Pacific deployment ===
Salvor departed Pearl Harbor for her first WESTPAC deployment on 6 September 1987. She was to accompany the tank-landing ship USS Barbour County which would tow three minesweepers, USS Conquest, USS Esteem, and USS Enhance to Subic Bay. Salvor returned to Pearl Harbor to first to onload parts for Conquest and later with USS Conquest in tow, after a collision between Conquest and Barbour County. After more delays because of casualties aboard Conquest, Salvor departed Pearl Harbor again on 26 September 1987. After a fuel stop at Kwajaelein, Salvor arrived at Subic Bay, Philippines, on 16 October 1987.

Salvor visited Hong Kong and returned to Subic Bay where she took two floating drydock sections (AFDB-1 and AFDB-2E) in tow. On 25 November she fueled at sea from USS Mauna Kea. Salvor conducted more at-sea fueling with USS Brunswick and passed ADFB-1B to Brunswick on 11 December. Salvor arrived at Pearl Harbor on 18 December with ADFB-2E in tow, and began a holiday leave and upkeep period.

1988 was an uneventful year for Salvor. She spent much of the year in maintenance availability periods, undergoing various training exercises and engineering inspections, and dealing with repairs related to a troublesome design flaw with her port shaft. Salvor was awarded the Battle "E", Green "C", and "DC" awards. However, she did participate in classified special operations from 19 April to 18 May and again from 18 June to 11 July.

=== Pearl Harbor salvage operations and Southern Pacific deployment ===
Salvor visited Kaunakakai, Molokai in January 1989 before returning to Pearl Harbor to conduct salvage training and diving operations in February and March. Salvor participated in de-beaching operations when the oil tanker Exxon Houston broke free of her mooring buoy and ran aground near Barbers Point, Hawaii, on 2 March. Salvor was awarded a Meritorious Unit Commendation for her participation in the salvage of Exxon Houston.

Salvor was again called into action for real-world non-military salvage operations when the barge Kamalu caught fire while adrift off the Wainai coast on 20 May. Salvor battled the fire aboard Kamalu for 16 hours.

Later that month, Salvor towed the decommissioned repair ship USS Hector between 16 and 20 May as part of a synthetic line towing experiment and supported an MK48 torpedo exercise between 21 May and 2 June.

On 19 June, Salvor departed for a SOUTHPAC deployment. During that deployment, she visited the following ports:

- Funafuti, Tuvalu, 29 June to 2 July
- Apia, Western Samoa, 4 to 8 July
- Vavu, Tonga, 10 to 12 July
- Nuka Alofa, Tonga, 13 to 17 July
- Pago Pago, American Samoa, 18 to 21 July
- Papeete Tahaiti, 26 to 30 July
- Raratonga, Cook Islands, 31 July to 1 August

A change of command ceremony was conducted while in port at Papeete on 29 July. Salvor returned to Pearl Harbor on August 17.

Salvor departed Pearl Harbor again on 8 September with the ex-YOG-68 gasoline barge in tow, and passed the tow to USS Fanning before sailing to Adak, Alaska, where she arrived on 2 October. Salvor conducted salvage training at Adak and returned to Pearl harbor on 15 October. Salvor spent the remainder of 1989 in our near pearl harbor, conducted dive operations for maintenance, and participated in law-enforcement operations.

=== First Eastern Pacific deployment ===
Salvor departed Pearl Harbor for San Diego on 9 January 1990, and arrived in San Diego and 17 January. She participated in lock-in lock-out operations with SEAL Team 3 and USS Blueback near San Diego. She departed San Diego on 1 February. After a port visit in Esquimalt, British Columbia on 6 and 6 February, Salvor arrived at Seattle on 8 February. Salvor searched for, but was unable to find a VA-145 A-6E Intruder from the waters of Puget Sound from 12 to 23 February, and returned to Seattle. After conducting dive operations in Puget Sound, and another brief stop at Seattle from 2 to 4 March, Salvor departed for Oakland, California where she spend most of March in an upkeep with SIMA San Francisco. After stopping at San Diego on 28 March, she returned to Pearl Harbor on 8 April.

=== RIMPAC '90 ===
Salvor departed Pearl Harbor on 14 April with the decommissioned submarine rescue ship ex-Coucal in tow. Ex-Coucal was disposed of in a SINKEX as the target of a Tomahawk missile fired from USS Chancellorsville.

Between 1 and 12 May, Salvor participated in exercise the multi-national Exercise RIMPAC '90. During the exercise she was in and out of Pearl Harbor to provide recovery and surface support craft for special warfare exercises, including SEAL Delivery Vehicle operations.

Between 13 and 14 May she recovered propeller blades for the Australian guided missile frigate HMAS Darwin, and she provided emergency towing services for the hydrographic survey ship USNS H.H. Hess (T-AGS-138) from 23 to 24 June.

Salvor supported more special warfare exercises from 7 to 8 July and again from 19 to 22 July, after conducting de-beaching exercises with ex-Tunica from 10 to 12 July. She began an upkeep period in Pearl Harbor on 23 July. And entered dry dock in pearl harbor for a planned maintenance availability. Salvor spent most of the remainder of 1990 in the dry dock, in the naval shipyard, and in post-availability trials and examinations.

=== Second Western Pacific deployment ===
Salvor departed Pearl harbor for her second WESTPAC deployment on 4 January 1991. In the first leg of her deployment, she towed the floating dry dock AFDL-40 from Pearl harbor to Subic Bay, Philippines. She arrived at Subic bay on 8 February after fuel stops at Kwajelein on 18 January, and Guam on 28 January.

Salvor participated in various exercises and provided towing service in the western Pacific during March, April, and May. She conducted salvage exercises with the Korean and Indonesian navies, and visited the following ports:

- Pohang, Korea, 6–7 March
- Sasebo, Japan, 19–21
- Pusan, Korea, 23–27 May
- Subic Bay, Philippines 13–14 April and 27–29 April
- Chinhae, Korea, 28 May
- Surabaya, Indonesia, 6 May
- Bali, Indonesia, 18–21 May
- Yokosuka, Japan, 11 June

Salvor departed Yokosuka, Japan on 11 June with ex-Cochrane in tow. She stopped at Midway, on 25 June for fuel, and returned to Pearl Harbor on 3 July.

Salvor again supported special warfare exercises from 6 to 9 and 12 to 16 August. She participated in EOD operations near Molokai from 26 to 31 August. She then spent the remainder of 1991 in or near Pearl Harbor conducting OPPE power plant evaluations, Salvage training and maintenance availabilities. A change of command ceremony was conducted on 25 October, at Pearl Harbor.

=== World-record salvage ===
Salvor began 1992 with test operations for the CURV III undersea recovery vehicle from 6 to 20 January. She departed Pearl Harbor on 21 January for Wake Island where she salvaged a UH-46A Sea Knight (BUNO 150968) helicopter of Helicopter Combat Support Squadron 11, which crashed into the sea on 14 August 1991. The helicopter was recovered from a depth of approximately 17,250 feet, which was a world record at that time.

=== Eastern Pacific towing operations ===
Salvor returned to Pearl Harbor on 9 March 1992, and departed en route to San Diego on 22 March. She arrived at San Diego on 1 March, and returned to Pearl Harbor on 3 May with ex-Vancouver in tow.

Salvor spent much of the summer in a planned maintenance availability, sea trials, and training in or near Pearl Harbor, with a visit to Kailua Kona, Hawaii for the International Billfish Tournament between 31 July and 4 August.

Salvor again departed Pearl Harbor for the Eastern Pacific, this time with ex-Flasher in tow. After delivering ex-Flasher for recycling at Bremerton, Washington, she had port visits at Seattle from 16 to 20 September, New Westminster, Canada from 21 to 24 September, and Portland Oregon on from 27 to 31 September. She returned to Pearl Harbor on 10 October where she spent the remainder of 1992.

Salvor conducted training and diving operations at Lahaina, Maui in January 1993, and conducted training operations in February. Her training cycle continued into march when it was interrupted by emergency towing operations for the stranded USS Cimarron from 15 to 31 March. She completed her training cycle, earning the CNO afloat safety award on April 7 and completing her operational propulsion plant examination (OPPE) on 22 April.

Salvor departed Pearl Harbor again on 11 May to deliver ex-Haddock for recycling at Bremerton, Washington. She then had port visits at Victoria, Canada from 28 to 31 June, Everett, Washington from 1 to 7 June, and Seattle, Washington 7–10 June. After participating in a mine warfare exercise, she arrived at San Diego on 16 June.

Salvor conducted salvage operations in the San Diego area from 1 to 20 July, including the recovery of a Sikorsky SH-60 Seahawk helicopter from a depth of 4000 feet. She escorted USNS Navajo during the tow of the recently decommissioned ex-Ranger to Long Beach, California on 20–21 July. She then arrived at Rodman, Panama on 31 July. Salvor departed Rodman en route Bremerton, Washington again on 1 August, this time with ex-Triton in tow, and she delivered Triton to Bremerton for recycling on 31 August.

Salvor returned to Pearl Harbor on 16 September, where she would spend the remainder of 1993 except for a dependent cruise to Kauai, Hawaii from 15 to 18 October and diving operations at Wainae from 7 to 10 December. Salvor conducted a change of command on 19 November.

Salvor conducted more towing operations in the Eastern Pacific in 1994, beginning when she departed en route to San Diego, California on 18 January, where she took ex-Peoria in tow on 29 January. After delivering ex-Peoria for storage at Pearl Harbor on 9 February, Salvor returned to San Diego on February 28. From 5 to 15 March, Salvor towed ex-Tuscaloosa to Pearl Harbor for storage.

=== RIMPAC '94 and more Eastern Pacific towing operations ===
Salvor visited Hilo Hawaii for the Merrie Monarch Festival from 8 to 10 April, and Lahaina, Maui where Salvor conducted diving operations from 12 to 14 April. Salvor conducted maintenance activities at Pearl Harbor during April and May before participating in the multi-national Exercise RIMPAC '94 training exercise in the Hawaii operating areas from 1 to 19 June.

After another maintenance availability at Pearl Harbor in July and August, Salvor Departed for en route Acapulco, Mexico for a port visit from 1 to 4 September. Salvor was in port at Rodman, Panama from 12 to 14 September, and departed with the decommissioned submarine ex-Woodrow Wilson in tow on 15 September. After stopping at San Diego, California for fuel on 29 September, Salvor continued to Bremerton, Washington, where she delivered ex-Woodrow Wilson for recycling on 6 October. Salvor stopped for port visits at Everett, Washington from 8 to 12 October and Vancouver, Canada from 14 to 20 October. Salvor then spent 24–25 October in port at Alameda, California before towing ex-Richard B. Russell to Bremerton, Washington. Salvor departed Bremerton on 1 November and stopped for a port visit at Portland, Oregon from 5 to 9 November before returning to Pearl Harbor, where she spent the remainder of 1994 in maintenance and holiday upkeep.

=== Emergent salvage tasks, the Bering Strait, and dry dock ===
Salvor departed Pearl Harbor on 17 January 1995 to rendezvous with USNS Navajo (T-ATF-169) and her tow, ex-Duncan after the primary tow pendant parted. Salvor recovered the tow pendant including 180 feet of chain, before Navajo entered Pearl Harbor, and thereby prevented damage to submerged cables in Pearl Harbor.

Salvor conducted salvage training exercises with the salvage hulk ex-Tunica, including beach-gear retractions and at-sea firefighting from 30 January to 3 February 1995. She was supporting diving operations for master diver evaluations in the waters off Reef Runway at the Honolulu airport on 6 January 1995, when USS Willamette lost an anchor and 10 shots of chain over the side in a depth of 170 feet. Salvor recovered the anchor and chain the following day and returned them Pearl Harbor before departing diver training at Molokini crater and a brief visit to Lahaina, Maui on 9 February 1995. She conducted a dependent's cruise during her return transit to Pearl Harbor on 10 February 1995.

Salvor was underway near Pearl Harbor from 21 to 22 February 1995 in support of a special project code-named Cluster CERES, which was related to a technique for passively locating radar transmitters near land and using them to create accurate maps.

After some maintenance availability and inspections at Pearl Harbor in early March 1995, Salvor departed en route San Diego, California on 13 April 1995 and arrived there on 22 April 1995. Salvor was underway off the coast of San Diego from 25 to 31 March 1995 to conduct the recovery of a US Navy McDonnell Douglas F/A-18C Hornet, BuNo 164044 of VFA-22, which crashed on into the ocean off the Southern California coast after a night catapult launch from USS Abraham Lincoln on 28 January 1995, killing Lt. Glennon Kersgieter. The aircraft was recovered from a depth of 5,000 feet. She off-loaded the aircraft at NAS North Island on 1 April 1995, and returned to Pearl Harbor on 15 April 1995, where she continued preparations for an OPPE inspection, which was conducted from 25 to 27 April 1995.

Salvor served as a platform for tests of MDSU One's fly-away mixed gas (FMG) diving system at the beginning of May 1995, and spend the remainder of May 1995 and the first half of June 1995 in or near Pearl Harbor. On 13 June 1995, Salvor departed Pearl Harbor with ex-Silversides in tow. After delivering ex-Silversides to Bremerton, Washington for recycling on 27 June 1995, she conducted port visits at Seattle, Washington, and Victoria, British Columbia.

On 7 July 1995 Salvor arrived at Kodiak, Alaska, where she embarked a diving team from Underwater Construction Team Two. She departed Kodiak on 8 July 1995 for Fairway Rock where she anchored from 11 to 12 July 1995 for an environmental clean-up operation. She returned to Kodiak on 17 July 1995 and debarked the UTC−2 detachment.

Salvor returned home to Pearl Harbor on 27 July 1995. During August 1995, she participated in exercise Cooperation from the Sea '95 with units from the Russian Federated Navy and Russian Federated Naval Infantry. The exercise included an amphibious landing off Bellows Air Force Base, Hawaii and a live at-sea fire fighting exercise with ex-Tunica.

At the beginning of September 1995, Salvor participated in ceremonies to observe the 50th anniversary of the World War II victory in the Pacific. She spent the remainder of 1995 in-port at Pearl Harbor. On 30 October 1995 she entered Dry-Dock Four at Pearl Harbor, along with USS Safeguard, where both ships remained until 22 December 1995. Salvor conducted a change-of-command ceremony on 12 January 1996.

On 18 June 1996, Salvor interrupted training operations to conduct the emergent at-sea recovery of a TB-29 towed sonar array from USS Los Angeles.

=== Third Western Pacific deployment 1996 ===
Salvor departed Pearl Harbor on 1 August 1996 for her third deployment to the Western Pacific Ocean. She spent 17–18 August 1996 in Sasebo, Nagasaki Prefecture, Japan. From 20 August to 3 September 1996 she conducted a bi-lateral diving and salvage exercise with the Republic of Korea Navy in The East China Sea near Chinhae, South Korea. She returned to Sasebo for upkeep from 5 to 18 September 1996.

Salvor visited Hong Kong from 19 to 23 September 1996 and Singapore from 6 to 9 October 1996, and Phattaya Beach, Thailand from 13 to 18 October 1996. Salvor conducted a bi-lateral diving and Salvage exercise with the Royal Thai Navy from 20 October to 1 November 1996.

Following a brief stop alongside USNS Tippecanoe at anchor at Singapore, Salvor arrived at Surabaya, Indonesia for a salvage exercise with the Indonesian Navy from 8 to 12 November 1996. The salvage exercise continued off Pasir Putih, Indonesia from 14 to 22 November 1996. Salvor concluded her visit to Indonesia with a port visit to Benoa, Bali, Indonesia from 24 to 26 November 1996.

On 2 December 1996, Salvor received stores and fuel from USNS Tippecanoe by astern underway replenishment off the western coast of Luzon, Philippines. Salvor returned to Chinhae, South Korea for a bilateral diving and salvage exercise from 11 to 16 December 1996. Before the end of the operation, Salvor received emergency tasking to Okinawa, Japan. Salvor was tasked to recover two sunken LARC-V vehicles near White Beach, Okinawa. Salvor arrived at White Beach on 19 December 1996 to load a side-scan sonar. Salvor searched for the vehicles from 20 to 22 December 1996. On 22 December 1996 Salvor received additional emergency tasking and served as the recovery platform for a Mk-82 1000-lb bomb. Salvor entered a three-point moor on 24 December 1996 and recovered the bomb.

After destroying the Mk-82 bomb at a remote location, Salvor continued the LARC-V recovery operations near White Beach. Salvor recovered LARC-V 842 from a depth of 300 feet, and delivered it to White Beach on 28 December 1996. Salvor departed for the return transit to Pearl Harbor on 29 December 1996.

=== 1997 Hawaii operations ===
Salvor arrived at Pearl Harbor on 12 January 1997, and entered a maintenance availability from 13 January to 13 February. Salvor transited to Hilo, Hawaii on 13 February for a pier survey and port visit followed by a salvage survey of a stranded sailboat at Kailua-Kona, Hawaii. Salvor returned to Pearl Harbor on 20 February.

Salvor spent the remainder of February and March 1997 in maintenance and training activities at Pearl Harbor. Salvor was underway to conduct towing operations with USS Willamette on 7 April. Salvor stopped at Lahaina, Maui from 15 to 17 April for a port visit.

Salvor participated in a MK48 service weapons test in the middle Pacific from 16 to 18 July. From 21 to 24 July, Salvor conducted a SINKEX of ex-Stoddard northwest of Hawaii.

In late 1997 Salvor conducted various maintenance and training activities at Pearl Harbor, in addition to the salvage and recovery of two Utility Landing Craft 1527 at Ford Island. Salvor also conducted two separate port visits to Kailua-Kona, Hawaii during this period, from 2 to 4 August for the Hawaii International Billfish Tournament and from 16 to 29 October for the 1997 Kailua-Kona International Ironman Triathlon Championship.

=== Fourth Western Pacific deployment ===
Salvor departed Pearl Harbor to begin her fourth deployment to the Western Pacific Ocean on March 28, 1998. She stopped at Apra Harbor, Guam from 12 to 19 April to debeach the yard tug boat USS Mandan.

Salvor arrived at Chinhae, Republic of Korea on 25 April. After on-loading stores and equipment, Salvor departed Chinhae to conduct the salvage of a USAF F-16D Fighting Falcon from 27 April to 9 May.

Salvor stopped at Hong Kong for a port visit from 16 to 19 May.

From 26 May to 6 June, Salvor was in port at Sembawang, Singapore. On 27 May divers from Salvor examined the starboard auxiliary power units of USS Sides.

Salvor arrived at Kuching, Malaysia on the island of Borneo for a port visit from 10 to 15 June. On 19 June Salvor anchored at Pulau Tioman, Malaysia. Salvor arrived at Kuantan, Malaysia on 21 June and commenced participation in the Malaysian phase of exercise CARAT '98. The exercise included salvage dives with the Royal Malaysian Navy. The Malaysian phase of the exercise concluded on 2 July.

Salvor arrived at Sattahip, Thailand on 6 June for the Thailand phase of CARAT '98. While in Thai waters Salvor conducted sidescan sonar operations in Sattahip Harbor and conducted dives to locate the lost anchor of a US Navy submarine.

Salvor returned to Sembawang, Singapore on 21 July for the Singapore phase of CARAT '98. On 25 July, Salvor divers inspected a sea chest on the hull of USS Sides.

From 27 to 28 July, Salvor conducted dive operation in support of the CARAT '98 Singapore phase, while at anchor in the Johor Strait.

From 6 to 9 August, Salvor was at Kota Kinabalu, Malaysia for port visit. Salvor transited the Taiwan Strait from 14 to 15 August, and arrived at Inchon, Republic of Korea on 19 August.

From 1 to 4 September Salvor conducted the salvage of USAF F-16C Fighting Falcon that had crashed in the Sea of Japan, near Kangnung Air Base, Republic of Korea. 50% of the wreckage was recovered, including the engine and flight data recorder. The wreckage was offloaded at Chinhae, Republic of Korea, on 6 September.

From 7 to 11 September, Salvor was at Sasebo, Japan for upkeep. Salvor began her return voyage to Pearl Harbor on 12 September, but was diverted to Yokosuka, Japan to await the passing of Tropical Storm Stella. Salvor departed Yokosuka on 17 September and arrived at Pearl Harbor on 28 September.

Salvor spent the remainder of 1998 in or near Pearl Harbor, conducting training and supporting certifications for other units, including USS Safeguard and Mobile Diving and Salvage Unit 1. Salvor at Nawilwili, Kauai for a port visit from 5 to 6 December. Salvor conducted a dependent's cruise and returned to Pearl Harbor on 7 December. Salvor stopped at Aloha Tower, at Honolulu for a port visit from 12 to 14 December. Salvor entered holiday upkeep from December 16–31 at Pearl Harbor.

=== 1999-2001 Hawaii operations and Eastern Pacific deployments ===
Salvor spent much of 1999 engaged in maintenance, certifications, and training evolutions in or near her home port at Pearl Harbor.

However, Salvor towed ex-Basswood from Pearl Harbor to San Francisco, California from 22 to 31 March 1999. Salvor then sailed to San Diego, California, where she participated in exercise Kernel Blitz '99 from 12 to 29 April. During this exercise, Salvor conducted mine field security, MK 5 Marine Mammal operations, and recovery of moored mines.

Salvor also stopped at Cabo San Lucas Mexico for a port visit from 4 to 6 May, before returning to Pearl Harbor on May 19.

Salvor stopped at Aloha Tower Market place from 13 to 17 January 2000, and conducted a change of command on 14 January.

Salvor returned to Pearl Harbor from 18 to 30 January and conducted Joint SCUBA diving operations with units of the Canadian military. Salvor also supported SDV operations from 31 January to 1 February.

Salvor stopped at Hilo, Hawaii for a port visit in support of the Merrie Monarch Festival from 27 to 30 April.

Salvor arrived at San Diego, California on 8 March and supported mine-laying and mine recovery operations from 10 to 21 March. "Salvor stopped at San Francisco, California from 25 to 27 May. From 28 May to 15 June Salvor was underway towing two vessels, ex-Ramsey and ex-General Hugh J. Gaffey, in a dual tow from San Francisco to the vicinity of the Pacific Missile Range Facility. Both towed vessels were disposed of as targets in support of Exercise RIMPAC 2000.

Salvor towed a decommissioned submarine from Pearl Harbor to Bremerton, Washington from 22 July to 6 August 2000. She towed ex-Pyro from Bremerton to San Francisco, California from 13 to 17 August. She then returned to Bremerton, towing ex-Okinawa from 22 to 29 August.

Salvor returned to Pearl Harbor on 9 September and remained there, mostly in the Naval Shipyard, for the remainder of 2000.

Salvor was underway near Pearl Harbor in support for search and rescue operations after the Ehime Maru and USS Greeneville collision from 9 to 12 February 2001. Salvor took on deep drone equipment and was underway for the wreckage survey and recovery of personal items from the sunken Ehime Maru from 17 February to 3 March.

Salvor towed ex-Wyman from Pearl Harbor to San Francisco, California from 16 to 26 March. Salvor supported mine shape recover operations as part of Exercise Kernel Blitz 2001 from 5 to 9 April and stopped at San Diego from 10 to 15 April. Salvor stopped at Cabo San Lucas, Mexico from 19 to 23 April before returning to Pearl Harbor on 3 May.

On 27 February 2018 Salvor completed an excavation of aircraft shot down near Ngerekebesang Island, Republic of Palau.

== Operational history as USNS Salvor ==
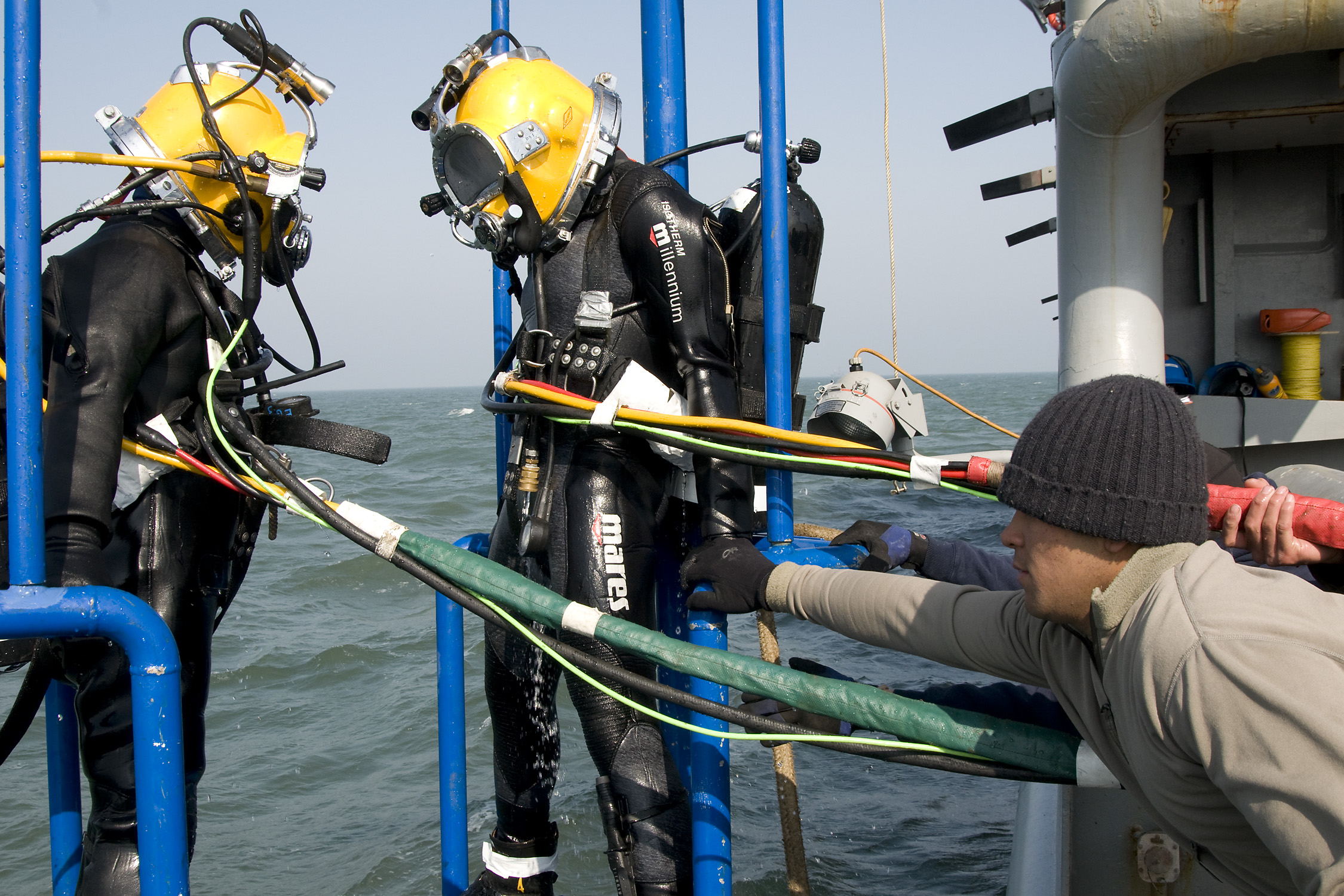
A South Korean and U.S. diver being recovered to the Salvor during the ROKS Cheonan recovery phase

Salvor freed the grounded guided-missile cruiser USS Port Royal from a coral reef near Honolulu International Airport on 9 February 2009.

Salvor participated in the rescue efforts for the ROKS Cheonan sinking during March 2010, supporting Mobile Diving and Salvage Unit ONE and Explosive Ordnance Disposal Mobile Unit FIVE, following involvement in the 2010 joint U.S./South Korean Foal Eagle exercise.

Salvor towed ex-Tarawa from San Diego to Naval Inactive Ship Maintenance Facility at Middle Loch, Pearl Harbor during June 2011.

Salvor towed ex-Cleveland to Pearl Harbor, arriving 9 December 2011.

=== 2012 SINKEX towing ===
Salvor towed ex-Concord from Pearl Harbor to be disposed of as a target during the SINKEX portion of Exercise RIMPAC 2012 on 25 July 2012.

Salvor towed ex-Niagara Falls out of Pearl Harbor on 12 July 2012, to be disposed of as a target during the SINKEX portion of Exercise RIMPAC 2012 on 14 July 2012.

Salvor towed ex-Kilauea from Pearl Harbor on 18 July 2012, to be disposed of as a target during the SINKEX portion of Exercise RIMPAC 2012 on 24 July 2012.

Salvor towed ex-Coronado from Pearl Harbor on 17 August 2012 to the vicinity of Guam, where Coronado was disposed of as a target during Exercise Valiant Shield 2012, on 12 September 2012.

During January and February 2013, Salvor participated in the removal of the grounded mine countermeasures ship USS Guardian from Tubbataha Reef.

=== Towing of HMCS Protecteur ===
Beginning 16 May 2014, Salvor towed the Royal Canadian Navy replenishment oiler HMCS Protecteur from Pearl Harbor to Esquimalt, British Columbia, after Protecteur suffered an engine-room fire in waters near Hawaii. Protecteur was delivered to Esquimalt on 31 May 2014.

=== TBF Avenger wreckage investigation ===
In January 2015 at Simpson Harbour, Rabaul, Salvor investigated and lifted the wreckage of a US Marine Corps Grumman TBF Avenger, BuNo 24264, of VMTB-233. After the cockpit drained during the recovery of remains, the aircraft wreck was replaced at approximately the same location in the harbor.

=== Orion spacecraft recovery operations ===
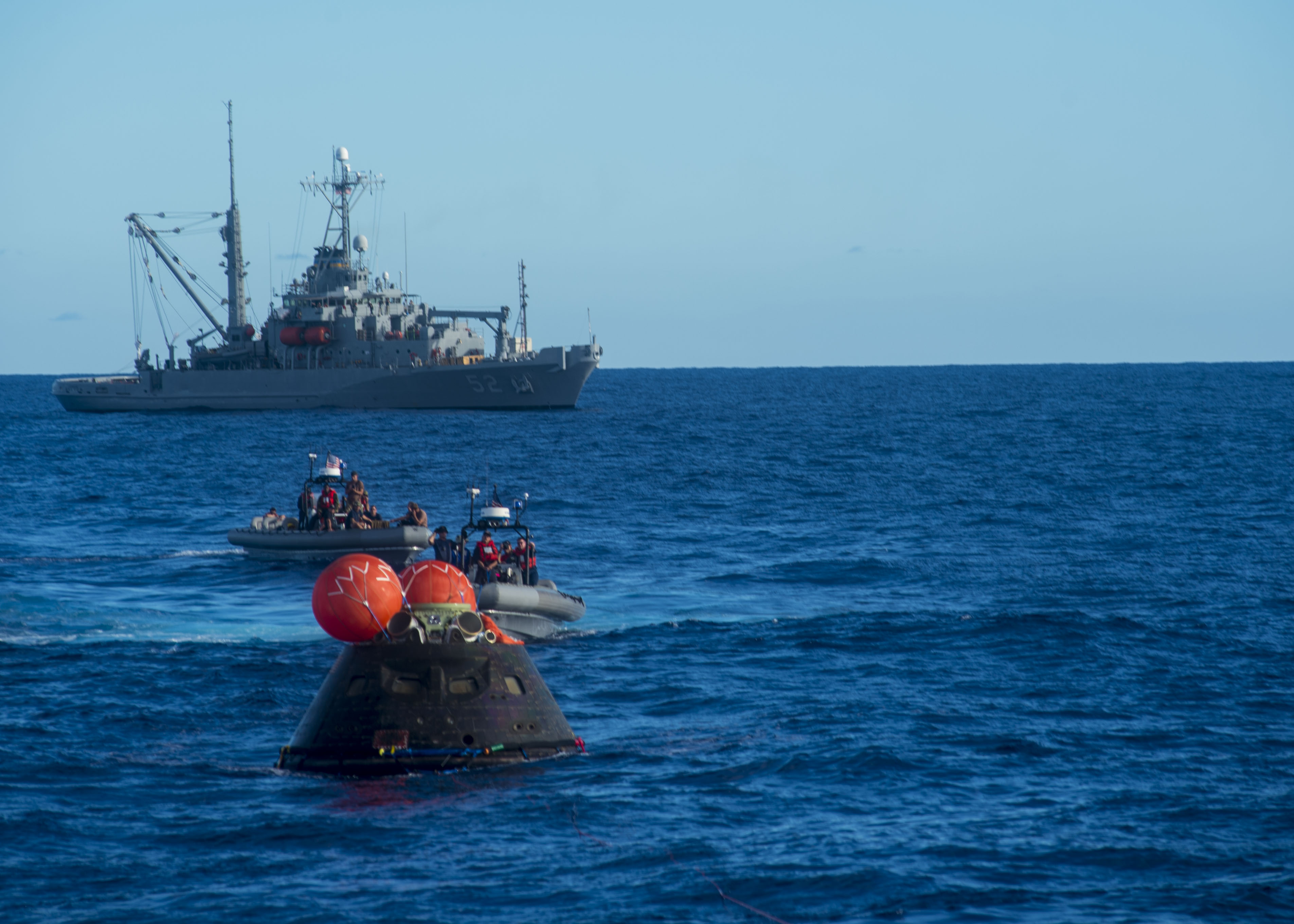
USNS Salvor stands by as boats guide NASA's Orion crew module towards the well deck of the San Antonio-class amphibious transport dock ship USS Anchorage.

Salvor conducted recovery tests of the Orion spacecraft in the Pacific Ocean from 11–12 September 2014, before handing off the capsule to USS Anchorage on 15 September, for another round of testing.

On 5 December 2014, Salvor, along with USS Anchorage, participated in the recovery of the Orion spacecraft capsule after the splashdown of Exploration Flight Test 1 (EFT-1) in the Pacific Ocean.

=== MV-22B Osprey recovery operations near Okinawa ===
In early December 2016, Salvor and the embarked Mobile Diving and Salvage Unit (MDSU) ONE, Company 1-8, were supporting Defense POW/MIA Accounting Agency operations in Okinawa. A US Marine Corps MV-22B Osprey of Marine Aircraft Group 36 crashed in the early morning of 13 December 2016, near Camp Schwab. Fortunately, all five personnel in the crash were rescued. By 15 December, Salvor was on site awaiting orders to begin recovery operations, while MDSU Company 1-8 performed a salvage survey in the tidal zone where the Osprey wreckage lay. Despite challenges such as weather and sporadic rocks in the area, the divers and Salvor's crew fully recovered the aircraft wreckage by the end of 21 December 2016. During the recovery operation, USNS Salvor ran aground forcing her to undergo extensive repairs in dry-dock.

=== MV-22B Osprey recovery near Australia ===
In September 2017, Salvor and embarked MDSU-1 divers recovered the sunken wreckage of a US Marine Corps MV-22 Osprey, from a depth of 215 feet (66 m), approximately 18 miles (29 km) from Queensland, Australia. The VMM-265 Osprey crashed on 5 August 2017, after taking off from USS Bonhomme Richard and while attempting to land aboard USS Green Bay. Three U.S. Marines were killed in the crash, and 23 others were rescued.

=== Removal of Oil from Prinz Eugen Wreck ===
Over a period of several months in 2018, Salvor worked with the Navy's Mobile Diving and Salvage Unit One and a civilian tanker, Humber, to pump fuel oil from the wreck of the former German heavy cruiser Prinz Eugen in the Marshall Islands in an attempt to prevent an oil leak from the capsized ship's full fuel tanks. The operation successfully removed approximately 250,000 US gallons of fuel, amounting to around 97% of the fuel remaining on the wreck.

=== Maintenance in India ===
USNS Salvor underwent repair and upgrades after it reached Kattupalli Shipyard, India of Larsen & Toubro on 9 July 2023. This was the third US Navy ship to undergo repairs at the shipyard and the first after the Master Ship Repair Agreement signing with L&T. This was a result of the U.S.-India 2+2 Ministerial Dialogue in April 2022 where US was represented by Secretary of Defense Lloyd Austin and U.S. Secretary of State Antony Blinken. The time period for the repair is two weeks after which it will again return in November for a 90 day comprehensive repair.
