= 2009 USS Port Royal grounding =

2009 shipwreck

Coordinates: 21°17′48″N 157°55′18″W

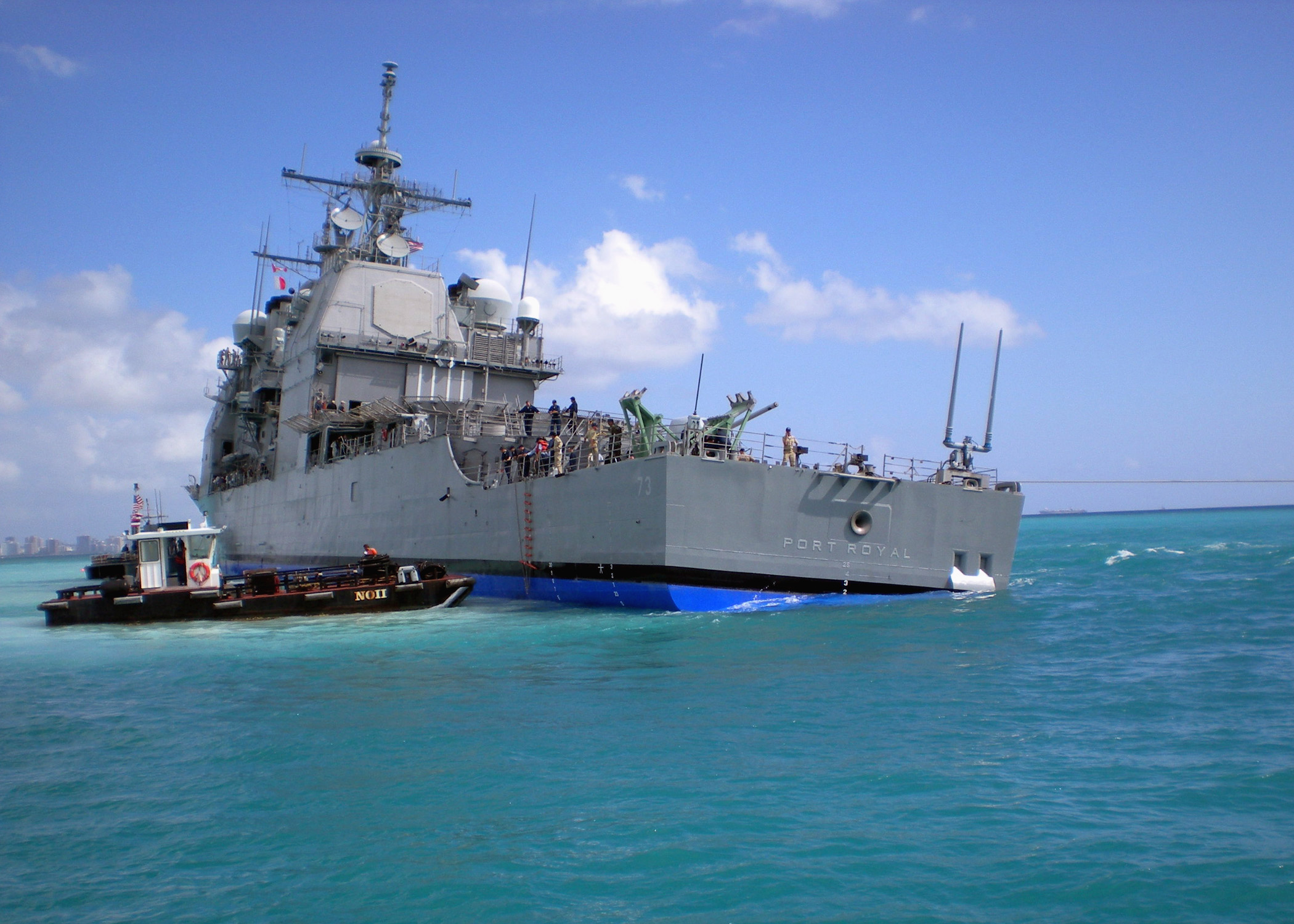
- USS Port Royal aground off Oahu
- Date: 5 February 2009
- Location: off Oahu, Hawaii
- Cause: Crew error, broken equipment
- Outcome: USS Port Royal and coral reef habitat damaged

The 2009 USS Port Royal grounding was a ship grounding by the United States Navy guided missile cruiser Port Royal off Oahu, Hawaii on 5 February 2009. The ship ran aground on a coral reef, damaging both the ship and the reef. The incident received wide press coverage in Hawaii, in part because of the damage caused to a sensitive coral environment, and also because the stranded ship was within sight of Honolulu off the airport.

Navy investigation found that the grounding was caused by a combination of a misread navigation system, a sleep-deprived commanding officer, broken equipment, and an inexperienced and dysfunctional bridge team. Commanding officer Captain John Carroll was relieved of duty and disciplined. Three other officers and one enlisted sailor were also disciplined. The Navy reattached 5,400 coral colonies in an attempt to repair damage to the reef.

== Grounding ==
Port Royal spent time in the Pearl Harbor shipyard for $18 million in scheduled repairs, then departed for the open ocean off Oahu for sea trials at 08:15 on 5 February 2009. The ship's fathometer was broken. At 12:01, the automated navigation system's primary input was shifted from a forward Global Positioning System to forward Ring Laser Gyro Navigation, an inertial navigator. Three times the Voyage Management System dead-reckoned the ship's location, mistakenly reporting the ship's location as 1.5 miles (2.4 km) from its actual position. The error was not noticed by watch-standers. The ship was undergoing her first sea trials following the repairs, including full power, steering, and helicopter flight operation checks.

The grounding occurred at 20:00, about 0.5 miles (800 m) south of the Honolulu International Airport's Reef Runway. No one was injured and no fuel spilled. The grounding was in full view of commercial aircraft landing and departing from the nearby airport, causing embarrassment to the Navy.

The cruiser has a draft of 33 feet (10 m) and ran hard aground on a sand and rock ledge in an estimated 14 to 22 feet (5–7 m) of water. The salvage ship USNS Salvor made three unsuccessful efforts to pull Port Royal off the sandbar on Friday, Saturday, and Sunday (6–8 February), despite full-moon high tides and offloading 200 short tons (180 t) of fuel and water, 7,000 US gallons (26,000 L) of raw sewage, and 15 short tons (14 t) of crew members.

According to the US Pacific Fleet, the ship ran aground while moving very slowly as she transferred shore-based aviation assessment officials to a smaller boat to take them to shore. The oil recovery ship Clean Islands was behind the ship to clean up oil spills. Rear Admiral Dixon R. Smith, the commander of Navy Region Hawaii and the Naval Surface Group Middle Pacific, served as the on-scene commander.

== Recovery ==
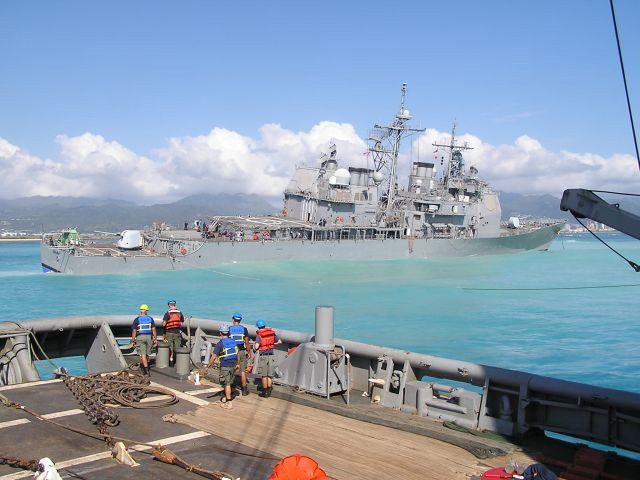
USNS Salvor and other ships tow the grounded Port Royal off a shoal near Pearl Harbor

On 9 February 2009, Port Royal was pulled off the rock and sand shoal at around 02:00 after crews removed another 500 tons of water and 100 tons of anchors and other equipment to lighten the vessel. The removal by a salvage ship and seven tug boats took about 40 minutes. No one was injured during the recovery effort, according to Rear Admiral Joe Walsh, the US Pacific Fleet deputy commander. Smith relieved commanding officer Captain John Carroll of his duties pending investigation. Carroll had been commanding officer of Port Royal since October 2008. Captain John Lauer, an official in Smith's Naval Surface Group Middle Pacific, temporarily assumed command.

The ship had suffered heavy damage to the underwater bow sonar dome and to its propellers and propeller shafts in the incident, and it was drydocked for repairs. Captain Neil Parrott presided over the investigation into the grounding.

== Damage assessment and repair ==
Once the raw sewage dumped by the ship had dissipated, divers from the Hawai'i Department of Land and Natural Resources examined the site and discovered that the grounding had damaged the coral reef. The Hawaiian divers, with help from Navy divers, began mapping the damage to ascertain the extent of work required to repair the coral. As of 12 February 2009, several of the cruiser's propeller blade tips had yet to be recovered from the ocean floor. Laura Thielen, chairwoman of the Hawaii state Board of Land and Natural Resources, told the United States Navy in a letter in April 2009 that the grounding had damaged 6 to 10 acres (2.4 to 4.0 ha) of the reef and that the "main injury scar" covered about 9,600 square feet (890 m^{2}). She added that the grounding may have damaged the habitat of green turtles.

On 18 February 2009, the ship entered Dry Dock Number 4 at Pearl Harbor for repair to the ship's shafting, running gear, propellers, painting of the underwater hull, replacement of the bow sonar dome and its internal elements, and repairs to damaged tanks and superstructure cracks. The Navy estimated that repairs would cost between $25 and $40 million and would be completed by September 2009. The Honolulu Advertiser reported that a shipyard worker had said that no work had been done to repair the warship as of 12 April 2009. The newspaper reported that its attempts to obtain information on the status of the warship had received short shrift or had not been answered by the Navy.

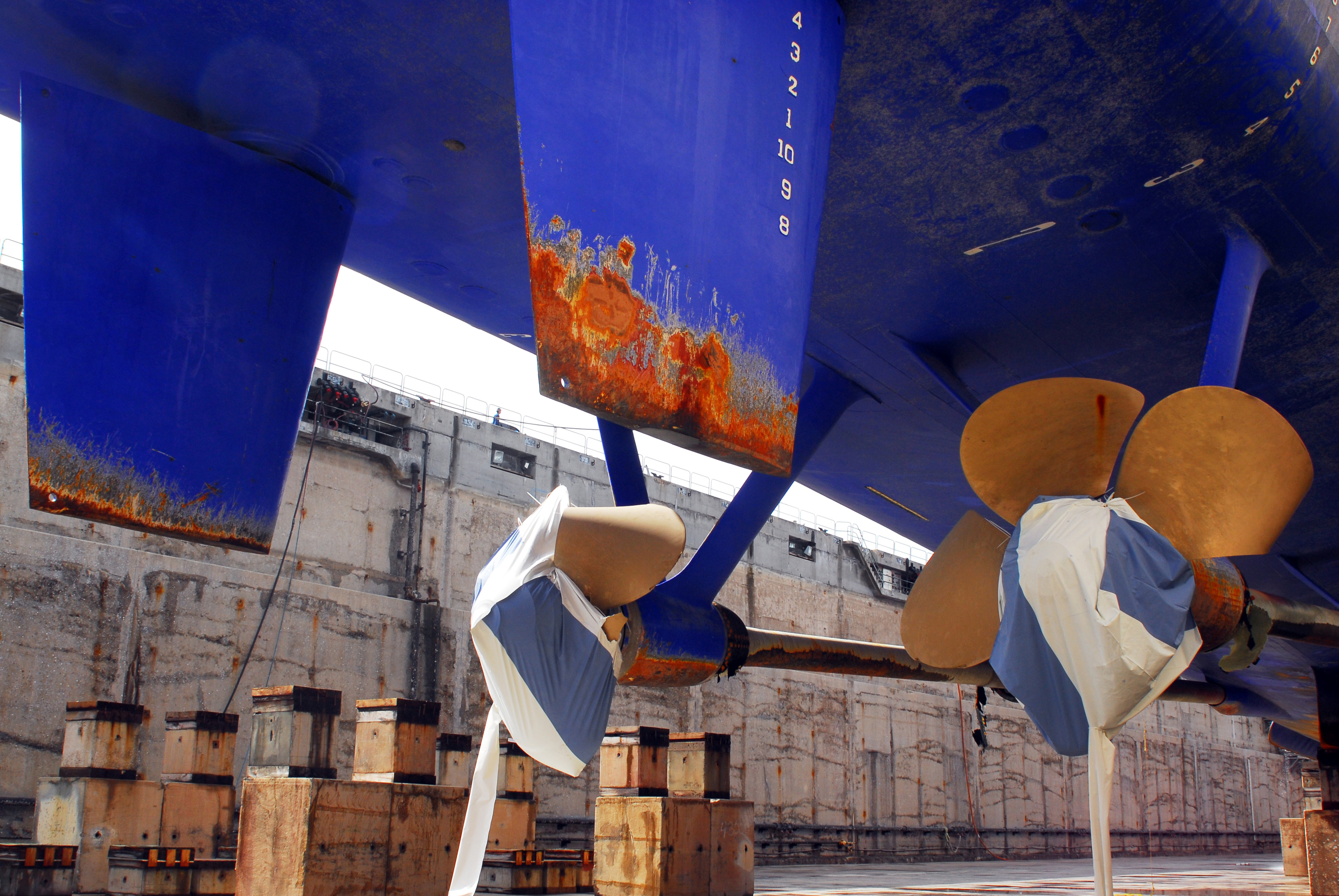
Port Royal in drydock for repairs following the grounding showing damage to the ship's propellers

As of the end of July 2009, most of the repairs to the ship had been completed. Structural problems occurred in rebuilding the sonar dome, the area of the ship most heavily damaged in the grounding. Also, the struts that support the propulsion shafts were found to be out of alignment by a small but critical amount. The repairs were expected to be completed in September and the ship was expected to return to operation in October. The ship deployed for the first time since the grounding in June 2011. The cruiser departed on an eight-month deployment to the Western Pacific and Middle-East.

Acting on a request from the state of Hawaii to repair the damage to the coral habitat, the Navy hired divers from AECOM, Sea Engineering and CSA International, Inc. Work to repair the damaged reef began the last week of April 2009. At a cost of $7 million, by 27 June 2009 the divers had collected 5,400 loose coral colonies and reattached them to the reef using cement and plaster of Paris. The divers also removed 250 cubic yards (200 m^{3}) of rubble. The Navy planned to conduct further repair work on the reef between October and December 2009 but this work was later suspended. The Navy reports that environmental experts have advised them that reattaching further coral to the reef would do more harm than good.

== Disciplinary actions and investigation findings ==
On 2 June 2009, the Navy disciplined four Port Royal officers for the grounding. In a hearing presided over by Vice Admiral Samuel J. Locklear, commander of the United States Third Fleet, Captain John Carroll was given non-judicial punishment for "dereliction of duty and improper hazarding of a vessel." Port Royal Executive Officer Commander Steve Okun was also given non-judicial punishment for dereliction of duty at the same hearing. In a separate hearing, Rear Admiral Dixon Smith, commander of Navy Region Hawaii and Naval Surface Group Middle Pacific, imposed non-judicial punishment on two other, unnamed Port Royal officers and an enlisted seaman for dereliction of duty and improper hazarding of a vessel. The Navy refused to provide further details of the punishments the sailors received.

The US Navy safety investigation into the accident, not intended for public release but which was obtained by the Honolulu Advertiser in July 2009, listed several contributing factors for the grounding. The factors included a misinterpreted navigation system, a sleep-deprived commanding officer, faulty equipment and an inexperienced and dysfunctional bridge team.

The report stated that Carroll had only 4½ hours of sleep in the 24 hours prior to the grounding, and only 15 hours of sleep during the previous three days. Also, he was at sea after a five-year break in sea command duty. Carroll had directed that the aviation assessment personnel aboard the cruiser be returned to shore in a small boat just before the grounding occurred.

The report found that the ship's fathometer, which measures water depth, was broken, as well as both radar repeaters on the cruiser's bridge. Some time before the grounding, the ship switched navigation systems from a Global Positioning System, called the Voyage Management System, to a gyroscope. The switch caused a 1.5-mile (2.4 km) discrepancy in the ship's reported position. Audible alarm bells triggered by the discrepancy were disregarded by the ship's crew. During the small-boat transfer, the cruiser's operations officer took a binocular bearing to the harbor landing from the boat deck and noted the position discrepancy, but was unable to correct the ship's course in time. Shortly thereafter, the ship ran soft aground, but then quickly was forced hard aground by the force of the waves.

The report concluded that in spite of the equipment and navigation systems failures, there were enough working sensors and visual clues to prevent the grounding. The report found that the ship's navigation evaluator lost situational awareness and that the "Bridge watch team, navigation, and (Combat Information Center) team did not work together to assess situation and keep the ship from standing into danger." Qualified lookouts were on board for watch duty the night of the grounding, but they were working in the mess as food service attendants and were not allowed to assume the watch. Furthermore, set and drift were not calculated.

The report stated that the cruiser had been rushed out of dry dock, with some work scaffolding removed from the ship only 30 minutes before the cruiser departed for the ocean trials. Also, the quartermaster of the watch was inexperienced and lacked training, having stood three months of watch on a deployment a year earlier, but could not plot fixes in near-shore waters. The report recommended a supervisory-level navigation course, as well as an "operational pause" of at least 96 hours between shipyard availabilities and sea trials to ensure crews were adequately rested and prepared for underway operations. Captain W. Scott Gureck, a spokesman for US Pacific Fleet, declined to comment on the investigation's findings.

The report was created by the Naval Safety Investigation Board but has been classified by the Navy Judge Advocate General as a "Dual Purpose Investigation". The Navy will therefore not release the report under the Freedom of Information Act. Reportedly, the Navy does not want to publicly discuss what caused the grounding because of threatened legal action by the state of Hawaii.

== Aftermath ==
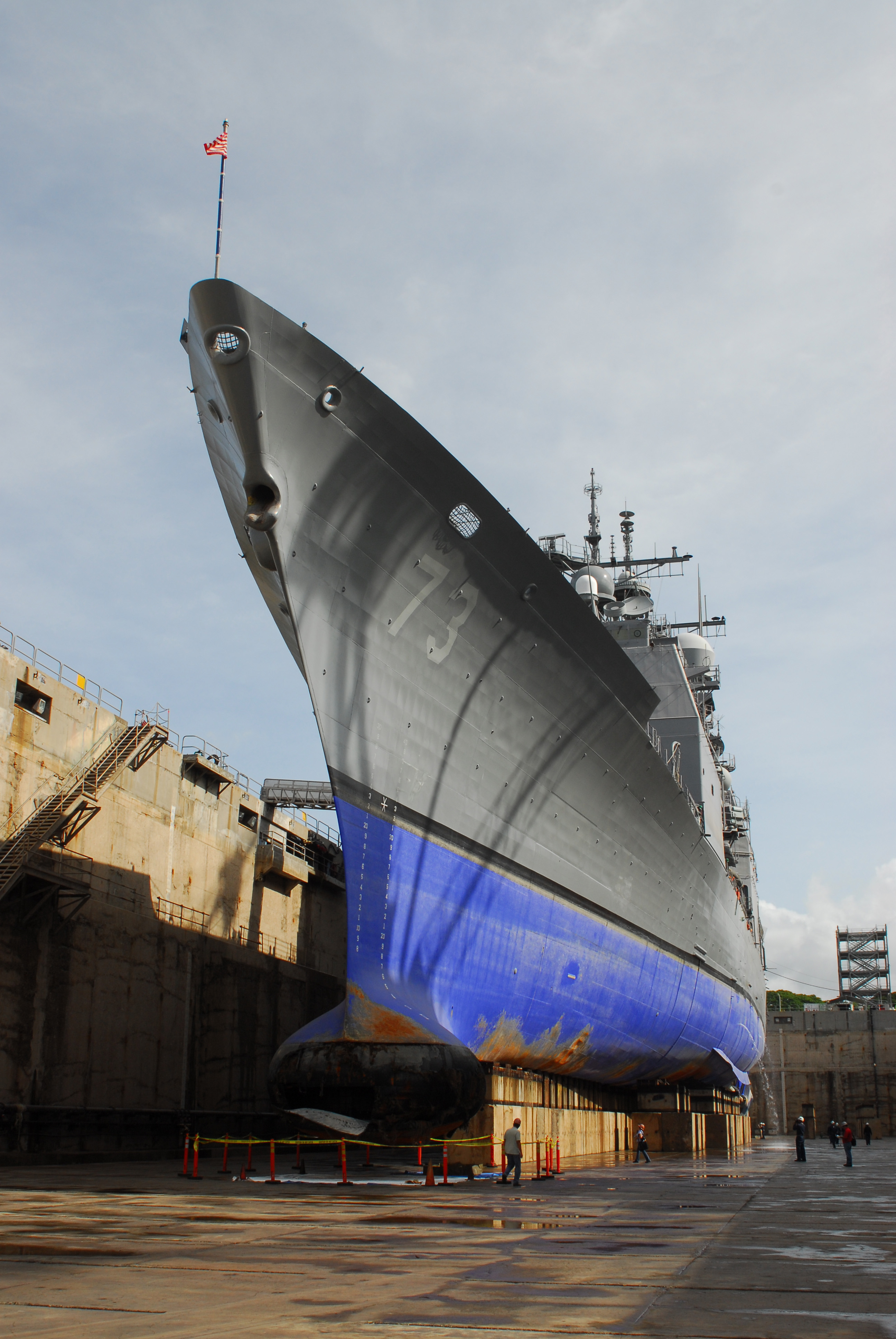
Port Royal undergoing repair in drydock following the grounding

Port Royal left dry dock at Pearl Harbor on 24 September 2009 for final repairs and assessment before being returned to duty. While in dry dock, technicians from BAE Systems and the Navy replaced the cruiser's sonar dome, reinstalled rudders, and made structural repairs to the ship's tanks, superstructure, and underwater hull. In addition, four sections of shafting were replaced, struts that support the propulsion shafts were realigned, and the underwater hull was repainted with blue antifouling paint.

In February 2011, the Navy and the state of Hawaii announced that they had reached a settlement on the damage caused by the grounding. The Navy agreed to pay Hawaii $8.5 million. The amount was in addition to the $6.5 million already spent by the Navy in efforts to repair the reef. "This settlement agreement recognizes the State of Hawaii's loss of a natural resource and takes into account the US Navy's unprecedented efforts to restore the reef where USS Port Royal ran aground," said Rear Admiral Timothy Giardina, US Pacific Fleet deputy commander. In response, William J. Aila, State of Hawaii Department of Land and Natural Resources interim chairperson, stated, "We believe the Navy has done the right thing by acknowledging its responsibility, working cooperatively with the state to restore the reef, and completing a settlement that will provide funding for protection of the state's marine resources."

After $40 million in repairs, the cruiser deployed for the first time since the grounding in June 2011. The cruiser departed Pearl Harbor on a seven-month deployment to the Western Pacific and Middle East. Said Smith, commander of Navy Region Hawaii and Naval Surface Group Middle Pacific, of the grounding incident upon the departure of the ship, "I've put it behind me. We've moved forward. The ship has moved forward. It was an unfortunate incident that we all learned from."

Navy command was said to have lost confidence that the vessel had been restored to seaworthiness, and, because of that, the ship was included on a list of seven cruisers slated for early retirement. Decommissioning in anticipation of eventual dismantlement was set for 31 March 2013. However, in answer to queries by Congress, the Naval Sea Systems Command (NAVSEA), in a report sent to Congress in May 2013, reported that the condition of the ship was comparable to certain other cruisers in the same class and that the effects of the grounding might not have been as severe as had been previously thought.

== See also ==
- USS Guardian (MCM-5)
- 1950 USS Missouri grounding
