= Hyannis =

Hyannis may refer to:

- Hyannis, Massachusetts, U.S., a village
- Hyannis Port, Massachusetts, U.S., another nearby village
- Hyannis, Nebraska, U.S., a village and county seat
- Hyannis (YTB-817), a U.S. Navy Natick-class large harbor tug 1973—1997
