= Ship grounding =

Impact of a ship on seabed or waterway side

Ship grounding or ship stranding is the impact of a ship on seabed or waterway side. It may be intentional, as in beaching to land crew or cargo, and careening, for maintenance or repair, or unintentional, as in a marine accident. In accidental cases, it is commonly referred to as "running aground".

When unintentional, grounding may result simply in stranding, with or without damage to the submerged part of the ship's hull. Breach of the hull may lead to significant flooding, which in the absence of containment in watertight bulkheads may substantially compromise the ship's structural integrity, stability, and safety.

== As hazard ==
Severe grounding applies extreme loads upon ship structures. In less severe accidents, it might result only in damage to the hull; however, in most serious accidents, it might lead to hull breaches, cargo spills, total loss of the vessel, and, in the worst cases, human casualties.

Grounding accounts for about one-third of commercial ship accidents, and ranks second in frequency, after ship-on-ship collision.

=== Causes ===
Among the causes of unintentional grounding are:

- Current
- Darkness
- Tide
- Visibility
- Waves
- Wind
- Depth of waterway
- Geometry of waterway
- Age of vessel
- Size of vessel
- Type of vessel
- Speed
- Human and organizational factors
- War, terror attack, and piracy

== Recovery ==
When accidental grounding occurs, the ship or its cargo, will need to be removed if possible. This is done for various reasons:

- The grounded ship remains seaworthy so the ship is removed in order to be repaired and return to service
- A stranded ship is unsightly
- A stranded ship experiences significant stress on its structure and will eventually become a shipwreck if not properly dealt with
- The ship contains hazardous material and can cause environmental damage if the material is released, which will eventually happen if stranded long enough
- A ship might be removed to prevent unauthorized entry into the ship by locals
- The grounded ship is a navigation hazard or otherwise obstructs a shipping route

== Gallery ==
Ship groundings

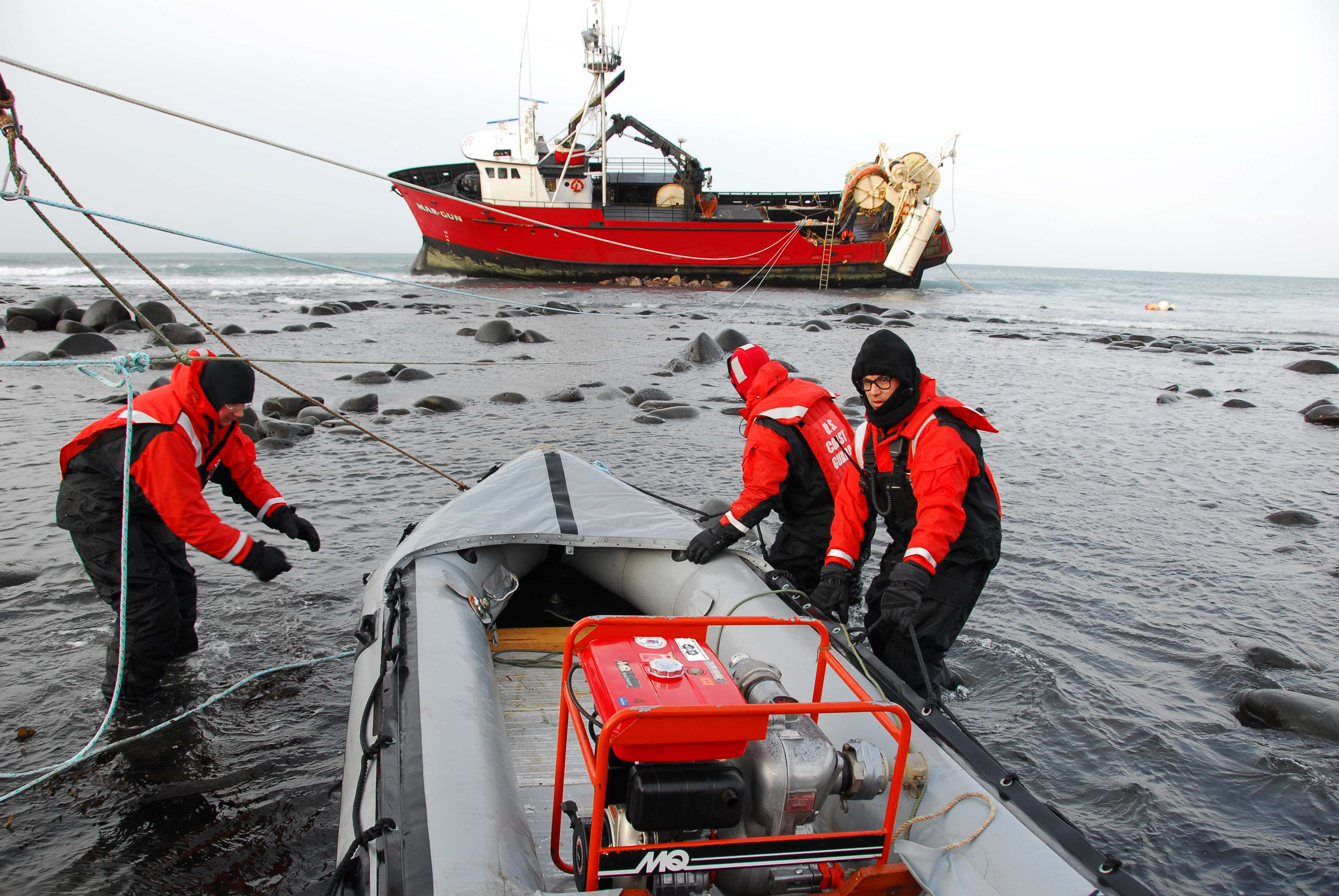
The United States Coast Guard performing rescue operations for a ship grounded near St. George Island, Alaska

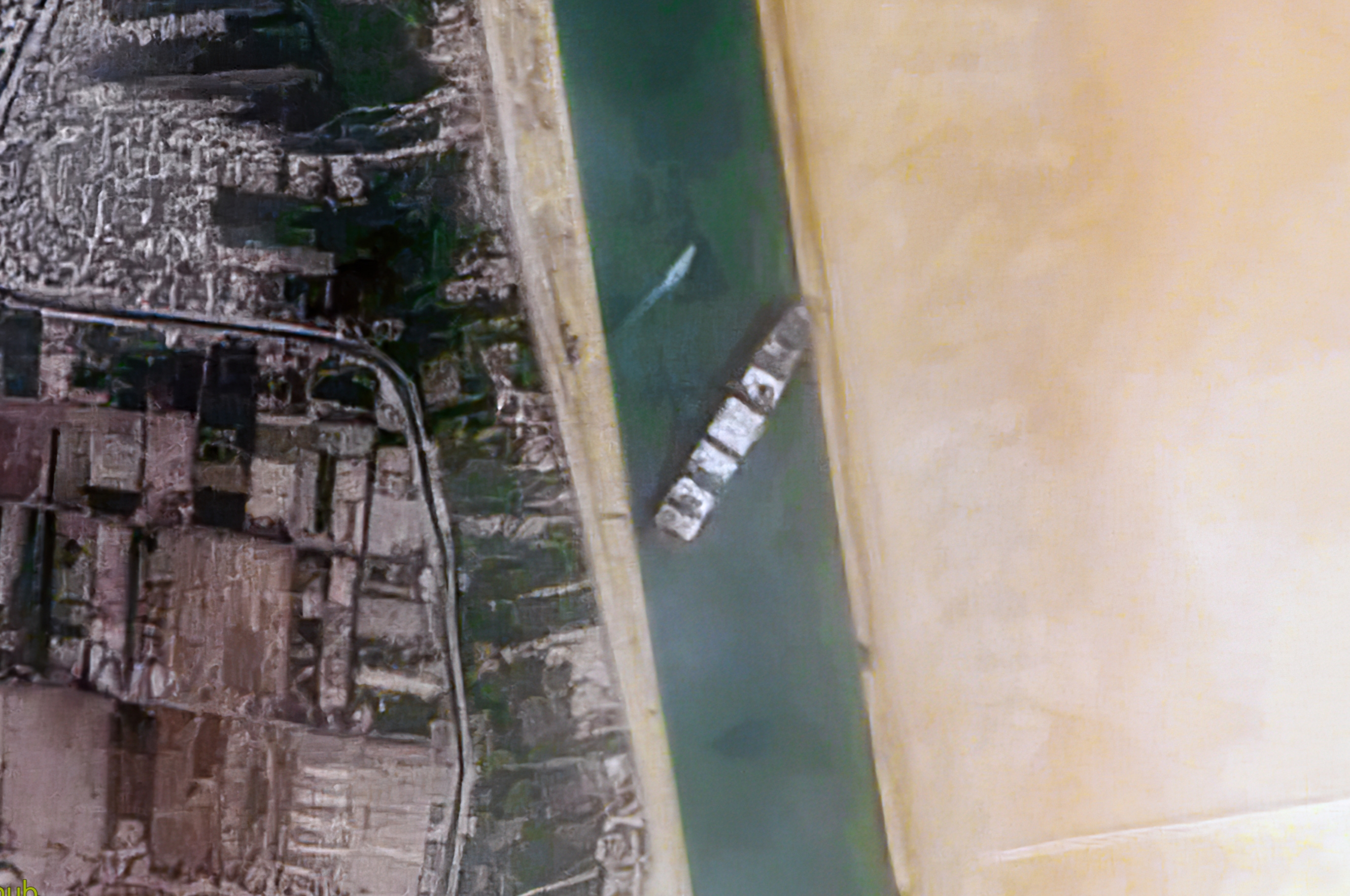
Container ship Ever Given stuck in the Suez Canal in 2021.

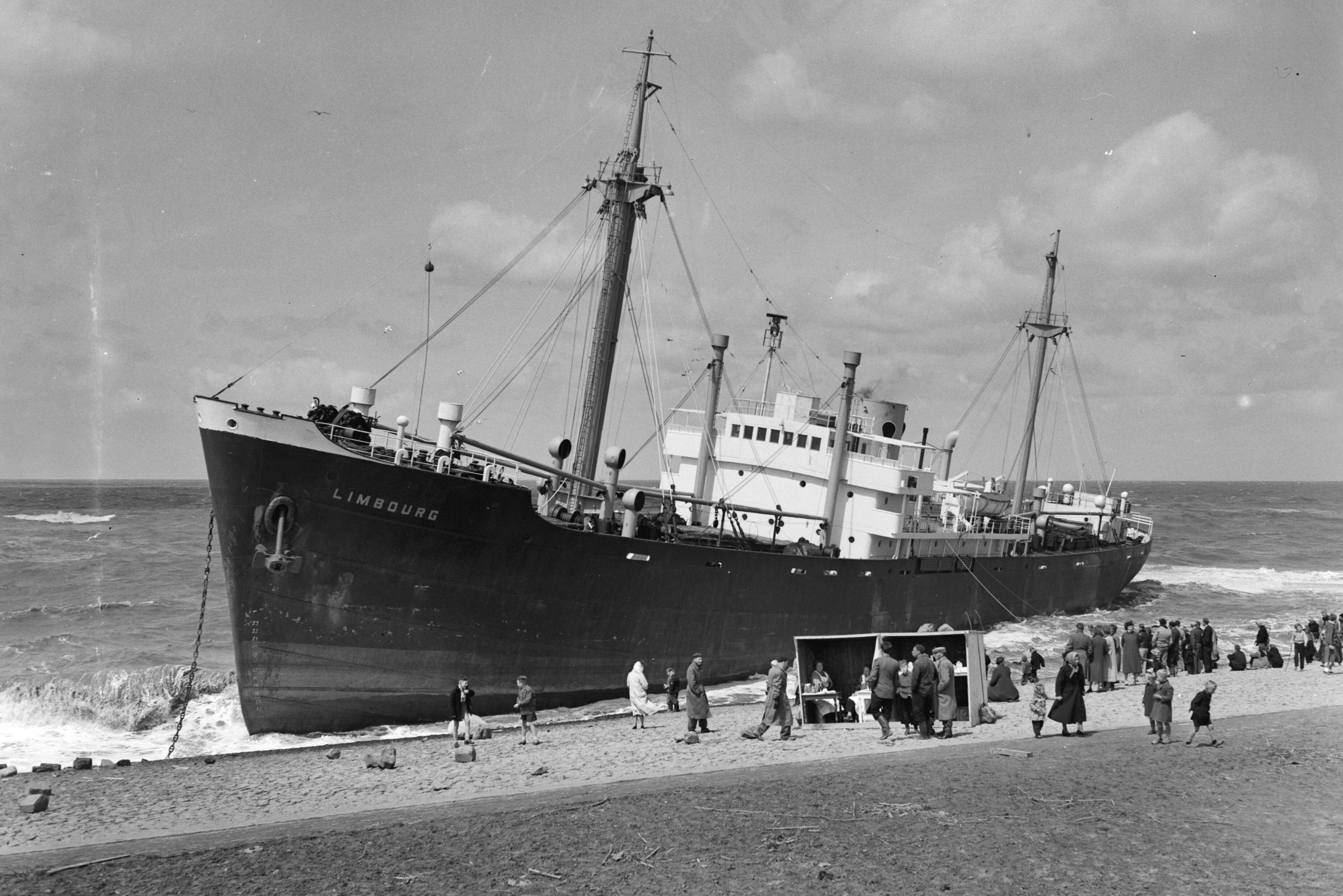
Cargo ship Limbourg stuck on the Dutch coast in 1955

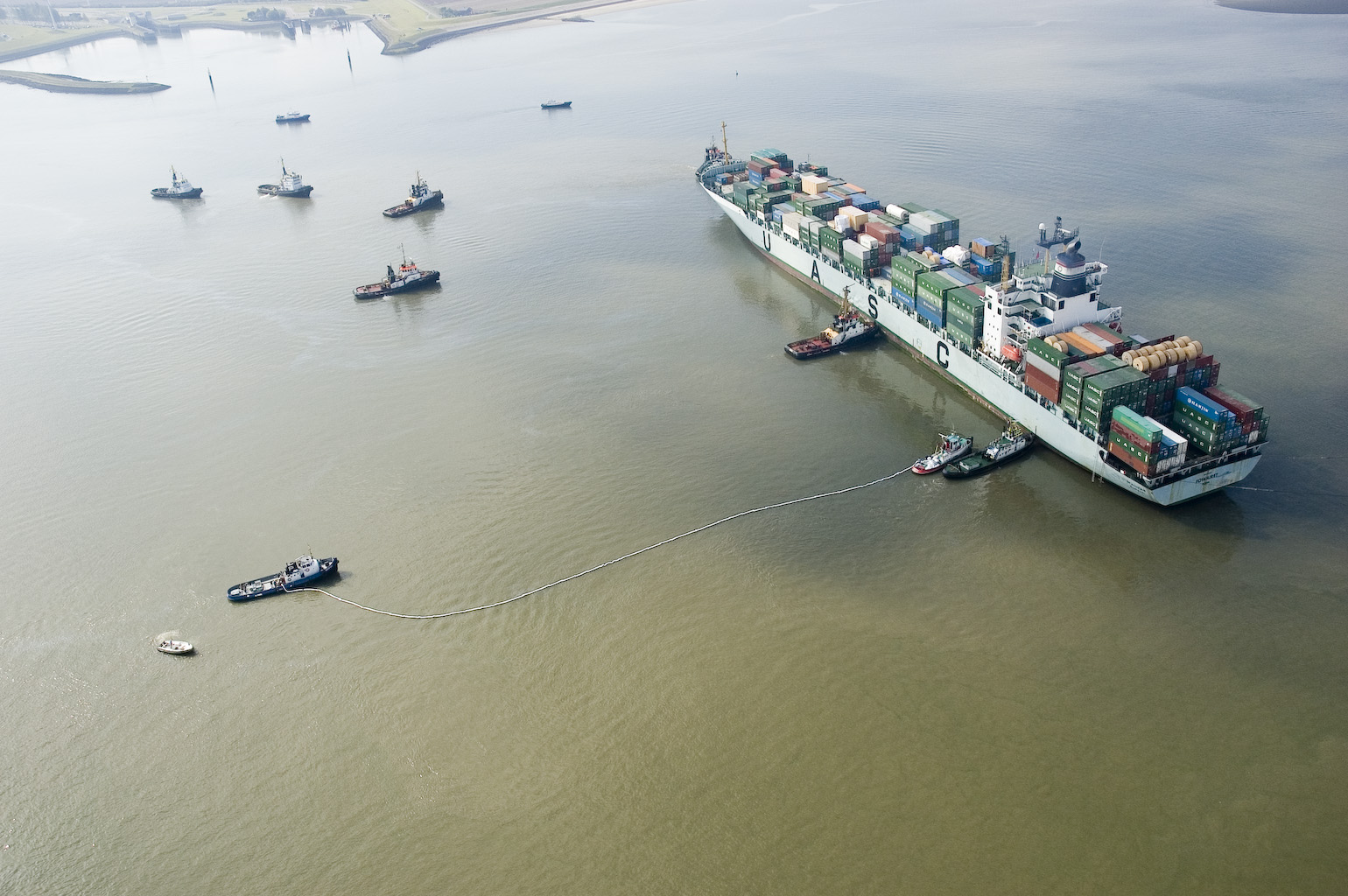
Container ship grounded and broken in the river Scheldt

== See also ==
- 2009 USS Port Royal grounding
- 2021 Suez Canal obstruction
- Amoco Cadiz
- Beaching (nautical)
- Costa Concordia disaster
- Exxon Valdez oil spill
- MS Riverdance
- MV World Discoverer
- Rena grounding and oil spill
- Spectacle Reef Light
- SS American Star
- SS Torrey Canyon
- SS Suevic
- HMS Oceanic
