= USS Tunica =

Tugboat of the United States Navy

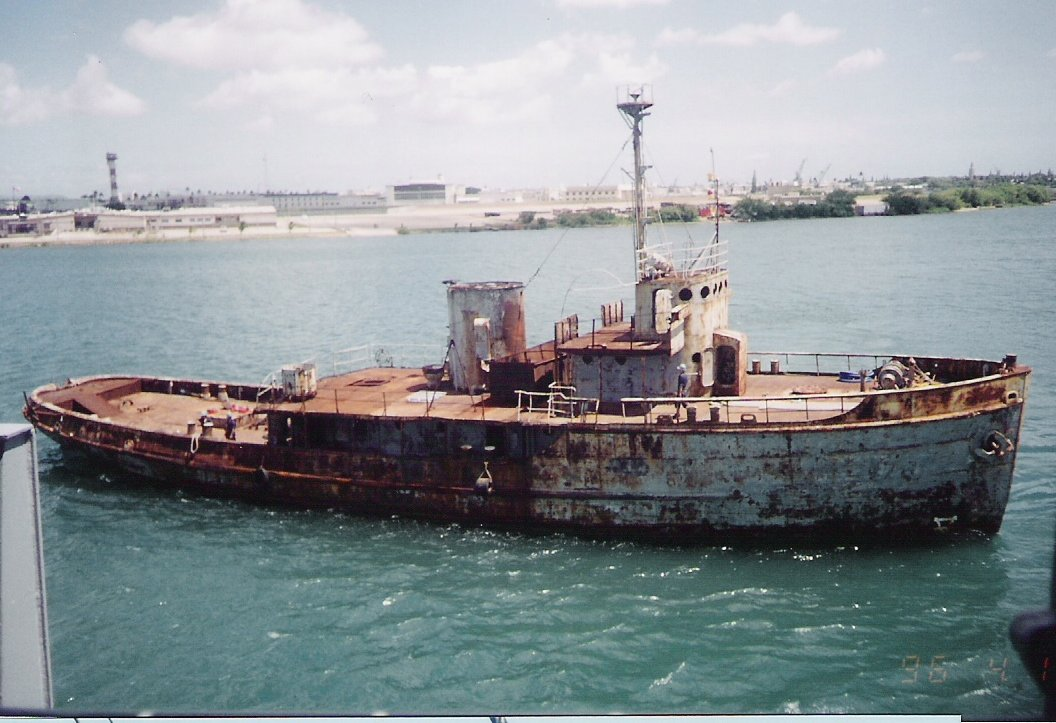
- The salvage training hulk Tunica in Pearl Harbor, Hawaii, April 1996

History

United States
- Name: USS Tunica
- Ordered: as Rescue Ocean Tug ATR-105, redesignated Auxiliary Fleet Tug ATA-178, 15 May 1944
- Builder: Levingston Shipbuilding Co., Orange, Texas
- Launched: 15 June 1944
- Commissioned: 15 September 1944
- Decommissioned: 23 December 1947
- Renamed: Tunica (ATA-178), 16 July 1948
- Stricken: 1 September 1962
- Fate: Sunk as a target, 29 January 1999

General characteristics
- Class & type: Sotoyomo-class auxiliary fleet tug
- Displacement: 610 long tons (620 t) light; 860 long tons (874 t) full
- Length: 143 ft (44 m)
- Beam: 34 ft (10 m)
- Draft: 15 ft (4.6 m)
- Propulsion: Diesel-electric engines, single screw
- Speed: 13 knots (24 km/h; 15 mph)
- Complement: 7 officers, 42 enlisted men
- Armament: 1 × single 3"/50 caliber gun; 2 × twin 40 mm AA gun mounts

USS Tunica (ATA-178) was a Sotoyomo-class auxiliary fleet tug acquired by the United States Navy for service during and after World War II.

ATA-178 was laid down on 10 May 1944 at Orange, Texas, by the Levingston Shipbuilding Co.; launched on 15 June 1944; and commissioned on 15 September 1944.

== World War II Pacific Theatre operations ==
Late in September, ATA-178 picked up two barges at New Orleans, Louisiana, for towing to Hawaii. The tug transited the Panama Canal, stopped at San Diego, California, and reached Pearl Harbor on 10 December 1944. After a brief layover in Hawaii, she departed Pearl Harbor to tow one of the 10 sections of a drydock to Guam, where she arrived on 14 January 1945.

Not long after her arrival in the Marianas, ATA-178 was assigned to the Samoan Defense Command. Between 10 February and 28 May, she towed supply barges between various bases in the South Pacific. Late in May, ATA-178 joined other tugs in towing barge-loads of equipment from the South Pacific to bases nearer to the active theaters of operations. During the final three months of the war, she called frequently at Guam, Leyte, Manus, Eniwetok, and Kwajalein to deliver equipment-laden barges.

== End-of-war activity ==
Following the cessation of hostilities, she reported to Nouméa, New Caledonia, where she underwent her first major overhaul. When that was completed, she resumed her duties in support of the disestablishment of South Pacific bases until April 1946. On the 24th, she departed Tutuila, Samoa, and headed via Pearl Harbor to San Diego, where she arrived on 31 May. On 18 June, the tug stood out of San Diego for the east coast. She transited the canal during the second week in July and arrived in New York on 24 July. A week later, she headed south and reported for duty at Mayport, Florida, on 22 August. For the next 16 months, she towed inactivated ships between Mayport, Charleston, South Carolina, and Savannah, Georgia. On 23 December 1947, ATA-178 was placed out of commission and berthed with the Texas Group, Atlantic Reserve Fleet.

== Reserve status and decommissioning ==
ATA-178 spent the remainder of her Navy career in reserve. On 16 July 1948, she was named Tunica. After almost 14 years of inactivity, Tunica was transferred to the Maritime Administration in October 1961 for lay-up with the National Defense Reserve Fleet at Beaumont, Texas. Eleven months later, on 1 September 1962, her name was struck from the Navy list. She was finally disposed of by the Maritime Administration sometime during fiscal year 1971.

== Service as salvage training hulk ==
Former USS Tunica was towed, along with three other vessels, from Beaumont, Texas to Pearl Harbor, Hawaii by USS Salvor between September and November 1986. At Pearl Harbor, former Tunica served as a salvage training hulk for salvage ships stationed there. While serving in this role, she was towed, run aground and retracted, and cast adrift with fires burning on upper decks and within her tow-winch room.

The ship was finally disposed of in a SINKEX on or about 29 January 1999.
