= USS Tenino =

Tugboat of the United States Navy

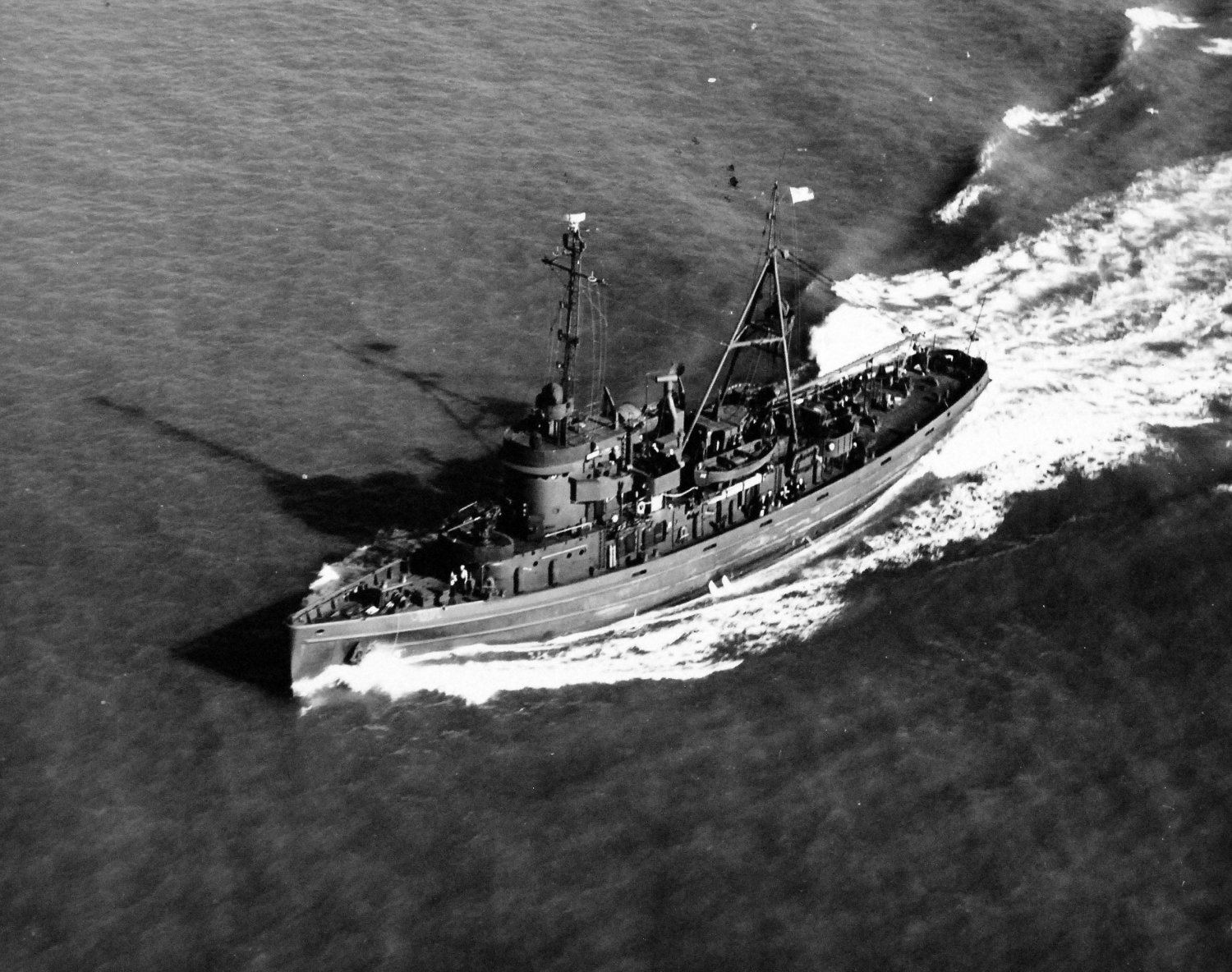
- Tenino underway near San Francisco, 9 December 1944

History

United States
- Name: Tenino
- Builder: United Engineering Co.
- Laid down: 16 June 1943
- Launched: 10 January 1944
- Commissioned: 18 November 1944
- Decommissioned: 17 May 1947
- Stricken: September 1962
- Fate: Unknown

General characteristics
- Class & type: Abnaki-class fleet ocean tug
- Displacement: 1,240 long tons (1,260 t)
- Length: 205 ft (62 m)
- Beam: 38 ft 6 in (11.73 m)
- Draft: 15 ft 4 in (4.67 m)
- Speed: 16.5 knots (19.0 mph; 30.6 km/h)
- Complement: 85
- Armament: 1 × 3 in (76 mm) gun; 2 × 20 mm guns

Service record
- Part of: Pacific Fleet
- Operations: World War II
- Awards: 1 battle star (World War II)

USS Tenino (ATF-115) was an Abnaki-class fleet ocean tug. She earned one battle star for service in World War II.

== Service history ==
Served in the Okinawa Gunto operation from April through June 1945 and the Assault and occupation of Okinawa Gunto, 11 May 1945. Transferred to Beaumont Reserve Fleet, 1961. Sunk as a missile test target 1986.
