= USS Port Royal (CG-73) =

US Ticonderoga-class cruiser

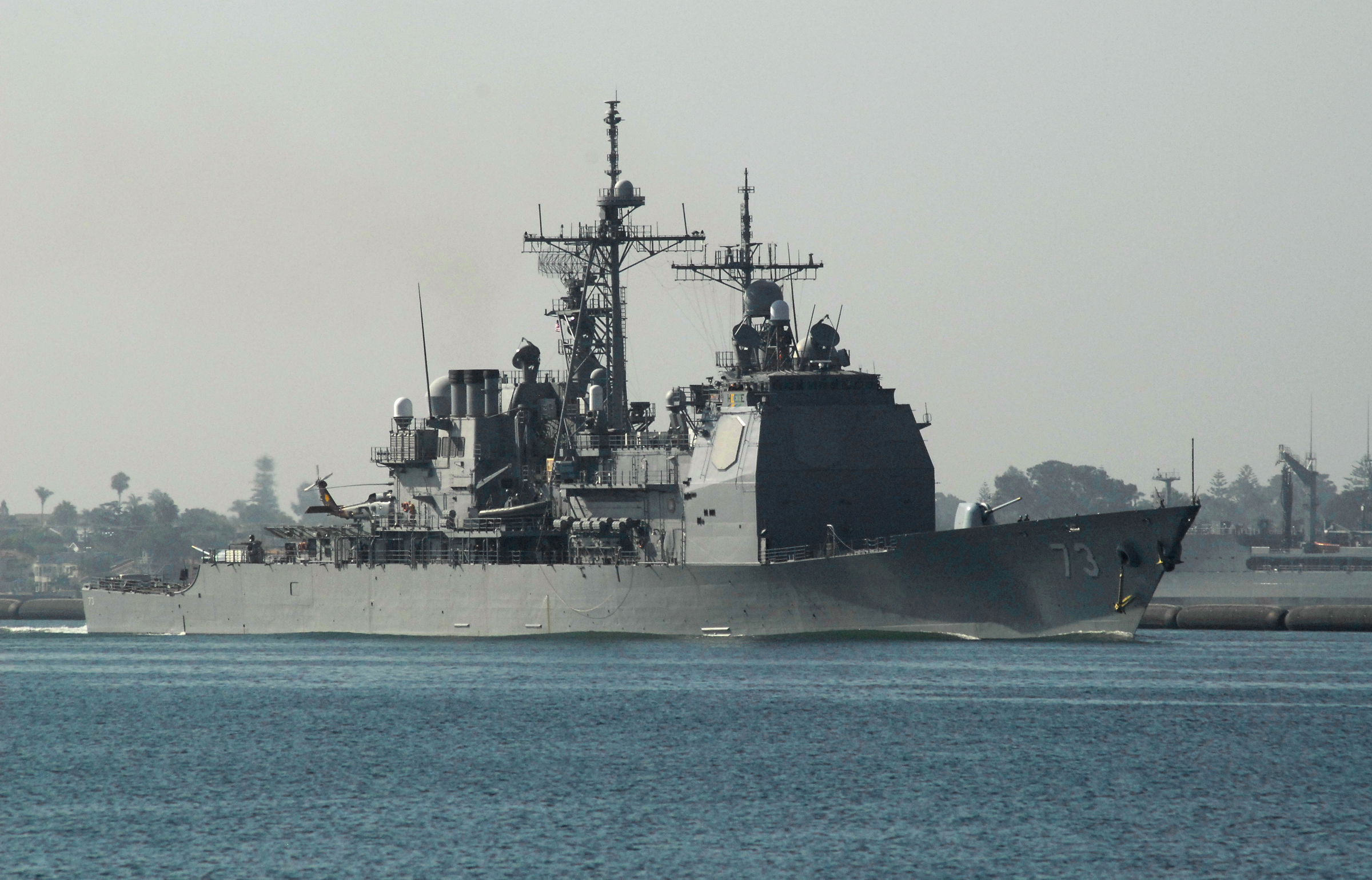
- USS Port Royal underway in August 2007

History

United States
- Name: Port Royal
- Namesake: Battle of Port Royal
- Ordered: 25 February 1988
- Builder: Ingalls Shipbuilding
- Laid down: 18 October 1991
- Launched: 20 November 1992
- Acquired: 25 April 1994
- Commissioned: 9 July 1994
- Decommissioned: 29 September 2022
- Stricken: 30 September 2022
- Identification: Call sign: NPTR; Hull number: CG-73
- Motto: The Will to Win
- Status: Stricken from the Naval Registry; final disposition pending as of October 2022
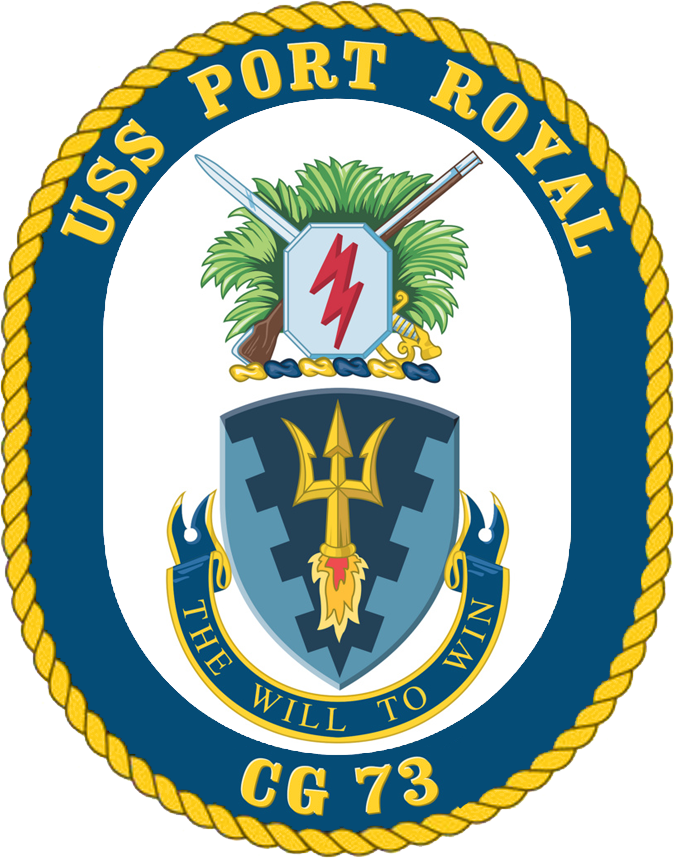
- Badge

General characteristics
- Class & type: Ticonderoga-class cruiser
- Displacement: Approx. 9,600 long tons (9,800 t) full load
- Length: 567 feet (173 m)
- Beam: 55 feet (16.8 meters)
- Draft: 34 feet (10.2 meters)
- Propulsion: 4 × General Electric LM2500 gas turbine engines; 2 × controllable-reversible pitch propellers; 2 × rudders
- Speed: 32.5 knots (60 km/h; 37.4 mph)
- Complement: 30 officers and 300 enlisted
- Sensors & processing systems: AN/SPY-1A/B multi-function radar; AN/SPS-49 air search radar (Removed on some ships); AN/SPG-62 fire control radar; AN/SPS-73 surface search radar; AN/SPQ-9 gun fire control radar; AN/SQQ-89(V)1/3 - A(V)15 Sonar suite, consisting of: AN/SQS-53B/C/D active sonar; AN/SQR-19 TACTAS, AN/SQR-19B ITASS, & MFTA passive sonar; AN/SQQ-28 light airborne multi-purpose system
- Armament: 2 × 61 cell Mk 41 vertical launch systems containing; 122 × mix of: RIM-66M-5 Standard SM-2MR Block IIIB; RIM-156A SM-2ER Block IV; RIM-161 SM-3; RIM-162A ESSM; RIM-174A Standard ERAM; BGM-109 Tomahawk; RUM-139A VL-ASROC; 8 × RGM-84 Harpoon missiles; 2 × 5 in (127 mm)/62 caliber Mark 45 Mod 4 lightweight gun; 2 × Mk 38 25 mm Machine Gun Systems; 2–4 × .50 in (12.7 mm) cal. machine gun; 2 × Phalanx CIWS Block 1B; 2 × Mk 32 12.75 in (324 mm) triple torpedo tubes
- Aircraft carried: 2 × MH-60R Seahawk LAMPS Mk III helicopters.

USS Port Royal (CG-73) is a decommissioned Ticonderoga-class guided missile cruiser that served in the United States Navy. She was commissioned on 9 July 1994, as the 27th and final ship of the class. Port Royal was named in honor of the two naval battles of Port Royal Sound, South Carolina, one during the American Revolutionary War, the other during the American Civil War. She was decommissioned on 29 September 2022. The ship is the second to bear the name, with the first being a steam-powered, side-wheel gunboat, from New York City, in commission from 1862 to 1866.

== Construction ==
The second Port Royal (CG-73) was assigned hull number CG-69 on 9 May 1989, but that number was reassigned to guided missile cruiser USS Vicksburg and CG-73 to Port Royal on 8 December 1989; was laid down on 18 October 1991, at Pascagoula, Mississippi, by Ingalls Shipbuilding, Litton Industries; launched on 20 November 1992; sponsored by Susan G. Baker (wife of James A. Baker III, Chief of Staff to President George H. W. Bush and former Secretary of State); and commissioned at Savannah, Georgia, on 9 July 1994.

== Characteristics ==
Port Royal and Lake Erie are the original cruisers for the navy's Linebacker Program (Milestone Phase I, II and III), which provided theater ballistic missile defense capability, as test platforms to detect, track, cue, intercept, and interact with other national assets to shoot down ICBMs. The vessel's Aegis and Standard Missile Tracking systems have been upgraded with "long range surveillance and track (LRS&T)", and the ships were outfitted to carry the modified SM-2 Block IVA TMD. As of 2009, Port Royal along with Lake Erie and Shiloh were the only three Ticonderoga-class cruisers to be equipped for the Aegis Ballistic Missile Defense Program. Port Royal participated as a tracking ship during operation "Stellar Athena" FTM 12 on 22 June 2007 off Hawaii. Port Royal's role has been taken by Hopper.

Originally, Port Royal was to be outfitted with the experimental shipboard mounted High Energy Laser Weapon System (HELWEPS). Based on a megawatt-class deuterium/fluorine chemical laser, HELWEPS would have replaced the standard 5-inch forward gun. HELWEPS was to have been used to destroy missiles up to about 4 kilometres (2.5 mi) away, or to burn out electro-optical sensors about 10 kilometres (6.2 mi) away. The outfitting, scheduled to occur in Naval Base Ventura County, Port Hueneme, California in 1994 was cancelled, along with all plans to install HELWEPS on Ticonderoga-class cruisers.

Four (LM2500) gas turbine engines propel Port Royal with 80,000 shaft horsepower (60,000 kW) at speeds greater than 30 knots (56 km/h; 35 mph). Two five-bladed controllable reversible pitch propellers (17-foot (5.2 m) diameter) and two rudders assist in acceleration and deceleration.

Sensors include:

- AN/SPY-1B(V) Multi-Function Radar (Four Mounts)
- AN/SPS-49(V)8 Air Search Radar
- AN/SPS-55 Surface Search Radar
- AN/SPS-64(V)9 Navigation Radar
- AN/SPQ-9 Gun Fire Control Radar
- AN/SPG-62 Illuminators (Four Mounts)
- AN/SQQ-89A(V)15 Sonar Suite
- AN/SLQ-32A(V)3 Electronic Warfare Suite

== Operations ==
Port Royal deployed from December 1995 until June 1996, as part of the Nimitz battle group Carrier Group Seven. The CVBG was participating in Operation Southern Watch, but was deployed to the South China Sea in March 1996, to act as a stabilizing force during the Third Taiwan Strait Crisis. During this deployment, Captain Richards transferred command to Captain Gary Roughead on 21 January 1996. Following her first deployment, Port Royal became the first U.S. cruiser to integrate women into the crew.

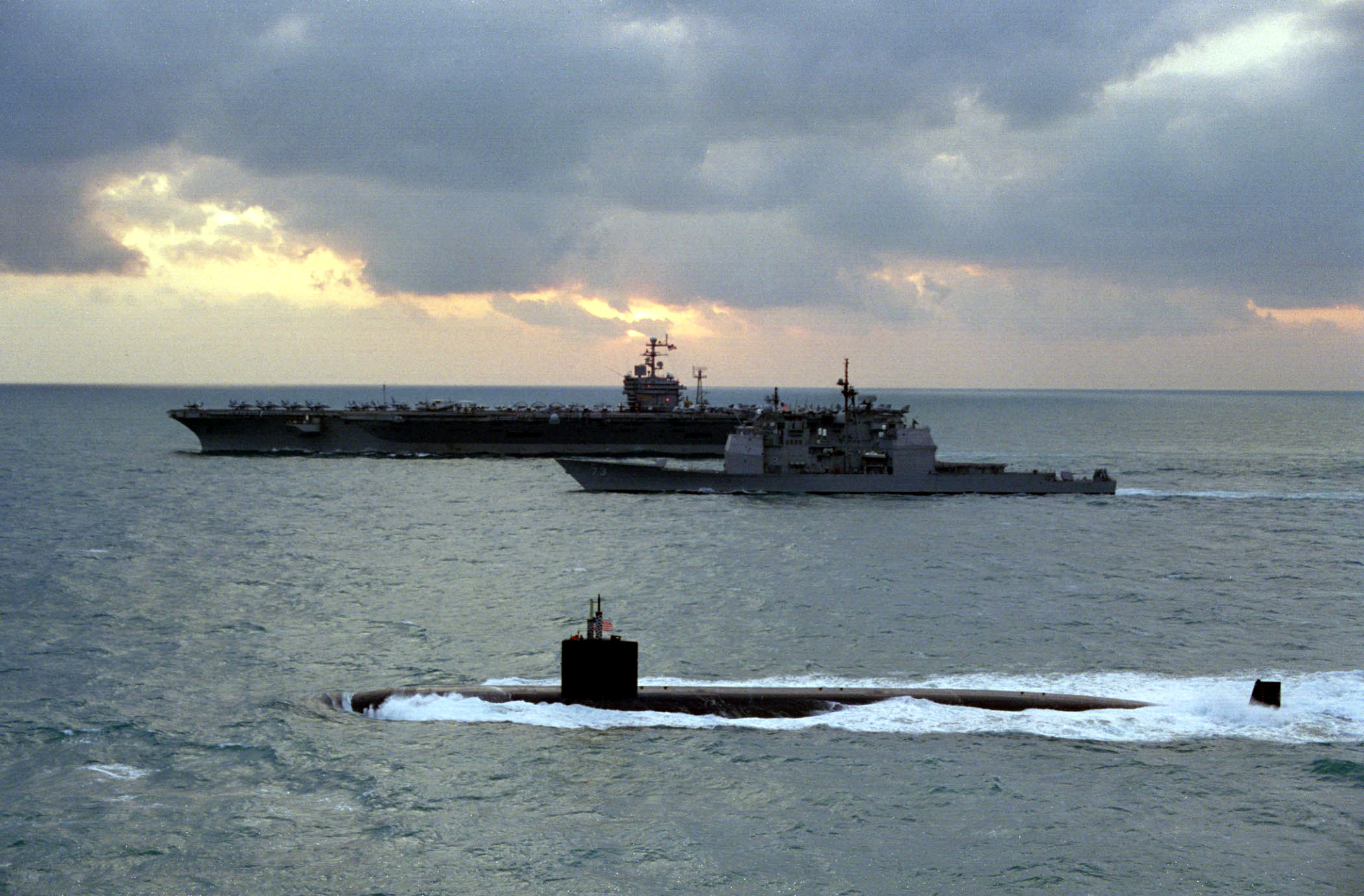
Port Royal (center) with the submarine Annapolis and the carrier Nimitz during Operation Southern Watch, 15 December 1997.

Port Royal deployed with the Nimitz battle group for participation in Operation Southern Watch from September 1997 until March 1998.

Port Royal deployed with the John C. Stennis battle group, participating in Operation Southern Watch. Leaving in January 2000, she returned to Hawaii early after sustaining damage to her port shaft and Hub during pursuit of a vessel suspected of smuggling Iraqi oil in violation of U.N. sanctions. She returned in June and then in August went into drydock for repairs and upgrades.

Port Royal deployed early Pearl Harbor on 17 November 2001, to join the John C. Stennis battle group on deployment in support of Operation Enduring Freedom.

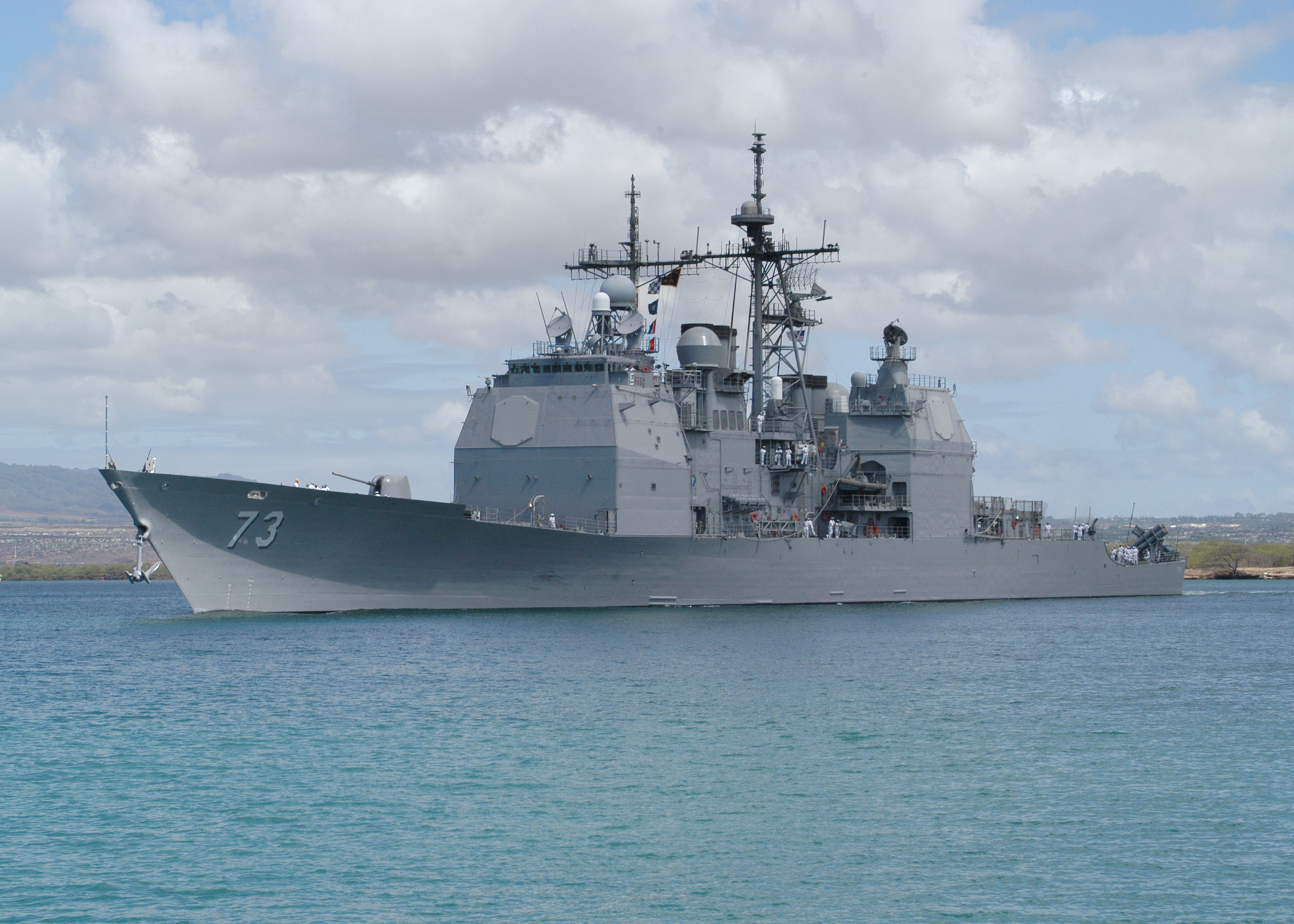
USS Port Royal in September 2003

In March 2003, she was assigned to Carrier Group Seven.

Port Royal deployed with Peleliu Expeditionary Strike Group-One (ESG-1) in support of the Global War on Terrorism (GWOT) from 3 September 2003 until 11 March 2004. This was the very first deployment of an Expeditionary Strike Group.

Port Royal deployed with Peleliu Expeditionary Strike Group-Three (ESG-3) in support of the Global War on Terrorism (GWOT) from 27 February 2006 until 5 August 2006.

On 6 January 2008, the destroyer Hopper, Port Royal and the frigate Ingraham were entering the Persian Gulf through the Strait of Hormuz when five Iranian boats approached them at high speed and in a threatening manner. The U.S. ships had been in the Arabian Sea searching for a sailor who had been missing from Hopper for one day. The U.S. Navy says the Iranian boats made "threatening" moves toward the U.S. vessels, coming as close as 200 yards (180 m). The U.S. Navy allegedly received a radio transmission saying, "I am coming at you. You will explode in a couple of minutes." As the U.S. ships prepared to fire, the Iranians abruptly turned away, the U.S. officials said. Before leaving, the Iranians dropped white boxes into the water in front of the U.S. ships. The U.S. ships did not investigate the boxes. Officials from the two nations differed on the severity of the incident. The Iranians claimed they were conducting normal maneuvers while American officials claimed that an imminent danger to American naval vessels existed.

=== 2009 grounding ===
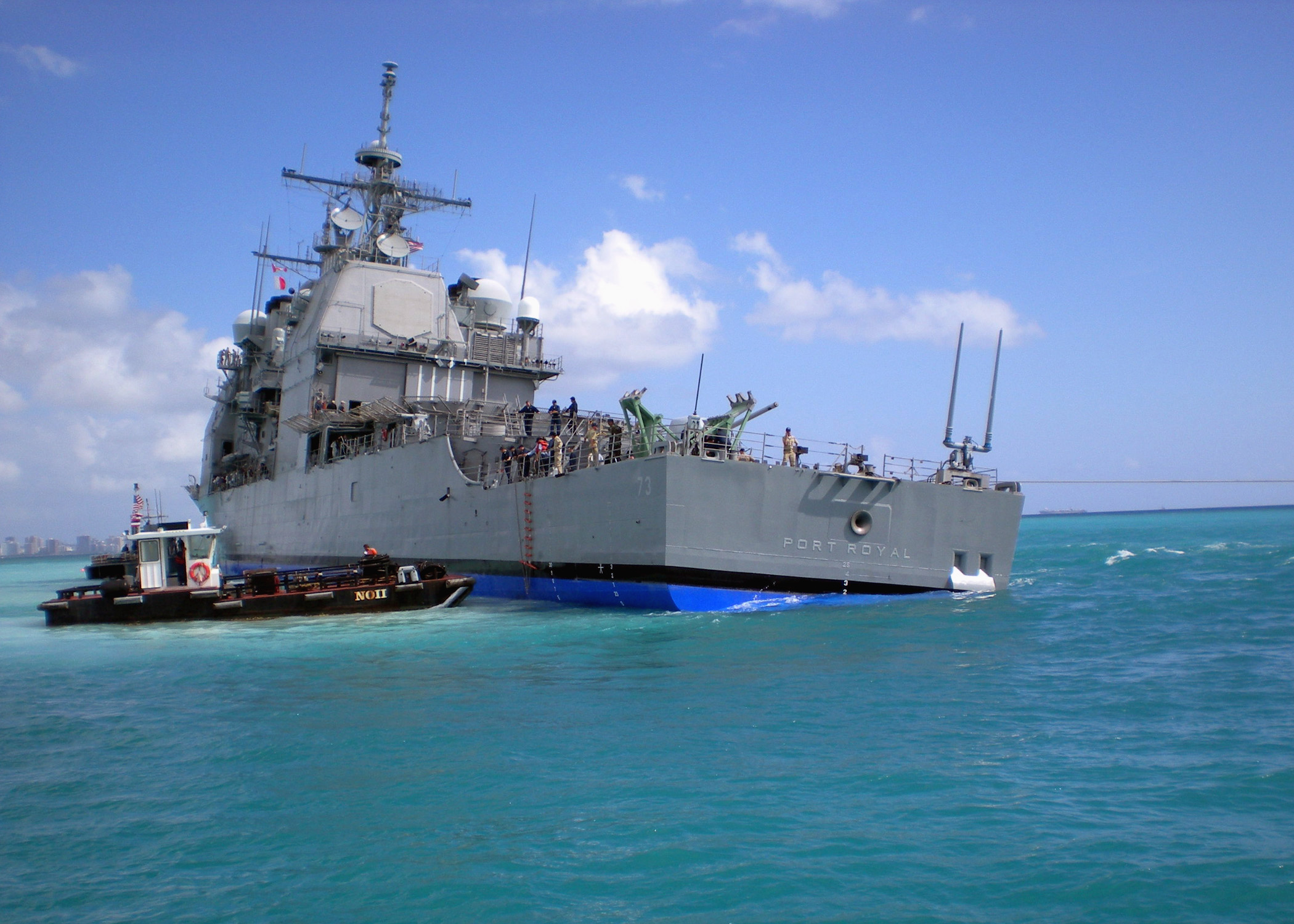
Port Royal aground off Oahu in February 2009

On 5 February 2009, at 21:00, Port Royal ran aground about a half-mile south of the Honolulu International Airport's Reef Runway. The ship had just come out of a dry dock after undergoing maintenance and was undergoing her first sea trials. No one was injured in the incident and no fuel was spilled. On 9 February 2009, Port Royal was pulled off the coral reef at around 2:00. No one was injured during the recovery effort, though damage to the reef was extensive, both from the ship's hull and the cables used to drag the ship off the reef. Captain John Carroll was relieved of his duties and, along with the ship's executive officer, commander Steven Okun and three other sailors, subsequently disciplined for dereliction of duty and improperly hazarding a vessel. Carroll had been the commanding officer of Port Royal since 23 October 2008. Rear Admiral Dixon R. Smith, who was aboard the ship, assumed temporary command on that day, and on 9 February, Captain John Lauer III, an official in Smith's Naval Surface Group Middle Pacific, assumed command.

The warship suffered heavy damage to the underwater bow sonar dome and to her propellers and propeller shafts and was dry-docked for repairs. Captain Neil Parrott was assigned to preside over the investigation into the grounding. On 18 February, the ship entered Dry Dock Number 4 at Pearl Harbor. The navy estimated that repairs would cost between $25 and $40 million. The ship left dry dock on 24 September 2009 but needed several more weeks of repair and assessment before returning to duty.

=== After the grounding ===
In May 2013, to answer queries made by Congress, Naval Sea Systems Command (NAVSEA) reported that the condition of the ship was comparable to certain other cruisers in the same class and that the effects of the grounding might not have been as severe as had been previously thought. A full report on the ship and her condition was anticipated in early August 2013. An April 2014 report by the GAO found that Port Royal was no more expensive to repair than other cruisers slated for retention.

=== Deployments ===
- 24 June 2011 – 13 February 2012 West PAC- Indian Ocean-Persian Gulf After repairs were effected, the cruiser departed on an eight-month deployment to the Western Pacific and Middle East but was forced to stop in Bahrain to have structural cracks repaired. Navy command was said to have lost confidence that the vessel had been restored to seaworthiness and, because of that, the ship was included on a list of seven cruisers slated for early retirement. Decommissioning in anticipation of eventual dismantlement was set for 31 March 2013.
- 25 August 2016 – 24 March 2017 West Pac-Indian Ocean-Persian Gulf On 24 March 2017, Port Royal returned to Pearl Harbor after a 212-day independent deployment to the Arabian Sea, Persian Gulf, Gulf of Oman, Red Sea, Gulf of Aden, South China Sea, Western Pacific, and Indian Ocean. During this time the ship conducted joint maritime security exercises with South East Asia partners, theatre anti-submarine operations, joint counterterrorism/smuggling exercises, Pacific presence operations in the South China Sea, 5th Fleet sector air defense, and carrier strike group operations with USS Dwight D. Eisenhower and USS Carl Vinson. Port Royal also conducted straits transits, providing protection for U.S. and international commerce and projecting sea control in the vicinity of Yemen and Somalia.
- November 2020 – 27 April 2021 West LAC – Indian Ocean-Persian Gulf
- 10 January 10 2022 - 18 July 2022 - Western Pacific and Persian Gulf

=== Decommissioning ===
In 2020, a U.S. Navy budget plan proposed putting Port Royal, as well as her sisters USS Monterey, USS Shiloh, and USS Vella Gulf, on a path to early decommissioning, as they had not been modernized.

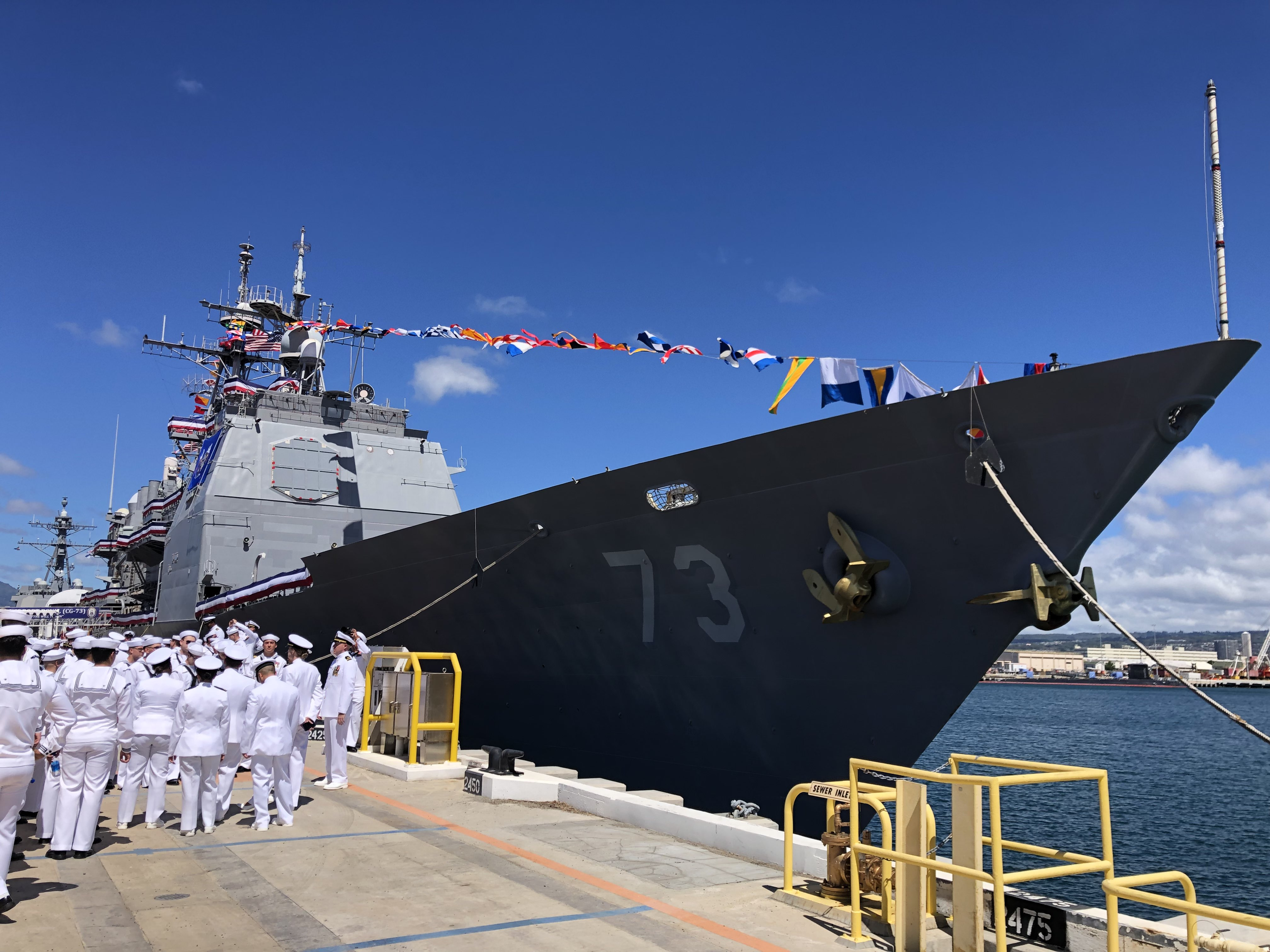
Port Royal during her decommissioning ceremony in Pearl Harbor, 29 September 2022

In December 2020 the U.S. Navy's Report to Congress on the Annual Long-Range Plan for Construction of Naval Vessels stated that the ship was planned to be placed Out of Commission in Reserve in 2022.

The ship was officially decommissioned at Joint Base Pearl Harbor–Hickam, Hawaii on 29 September 2022 She was stricken from the Naval Vessel Registry on 30 September 2022. As of October 2022, her final disposition remains pending.

== Awards ==
- Navy Unit Commendation – (Oct 1997 – Apr 1998, Dec 1995 – May 1996, Jan – Dec 1998)
- Navy Meritorious Unit Commendation – (Jan 1999 – Sep 2001, Oct 2016 – Jan 2017)
- Navy E Ribbon – (1995, 1996, 1997, 1998, 1999, 2001, 2002, 2004, 2005, 2011, 2021)
