= Hyannis (YTB-817) =

Tugboat of the United States Navy

History

United States
- Namesake: Hyannis, Massachusetts
- Awarded: 9 August 1971
- Builder: Marinette Marine
- Laid down: 12 July 1972
- Launched: 15 March 1973
- Acquired: 17 May 1973
- In service: 1973
- Out of service: 1997
- Stricken: 21 August 1997
- Identification: IMO number: 8744688; MMSI number: 316011504; Callsign: CFG582
- Fate: Transferred to USFWS; 17 October 1997

General characteristics
- Class & type: Natick-class large harbor tug
- Displacement: 286 long tons (291 t) (light); 346 long tons (352 t) (full)
- Length: 109 ft (33 m)
- Beam: 31 ft (9.4 m)
- Draft: 14 ft (4.3 m)
- Propulsion: One diesel propulsion engine, 2000 HP
- Speed: 12 knots (14 mph; 22 km/h)
- Complement: 12
- Armament: None

Hyannis (YTB-817) was a United States Navy Natick-class large harbor tug named for Hyannis, Massachusetts.

== Construction ==
The contract for Hyannis was awarded 9 August 1971. She was laid down on 12 July 1972 at Marinette, Wisconsin, by Marinette Marine and launched 15 March 1973.

== Operational history ==
Stricken from the Navy List 21 August 1997, Hyannis was transferred to the United States Fish and Wildlife Service at Midway Atoll and renamed Constant II. In 2006, she was sold and renamed Sea-Link Pusher.
