= List of miscellaneous ships of the Turkish Navy =

This is a list of Turkish Navy miscellaneous ships that have served past and present, from 10 July 1920 to present.

== School ships ==
- Mecidiye ( William Cramp & Sons, Philadelphia, Prut / Прут) - decommissioned on 1 March 1947, sold for scrap in 1952 & broken up between 1952 and 1956
- Hamidiye ( (Sir W G Armstrong Whitworth & Co Ltd., Newcastle) - decommissioned in March 1947, from 1949-1951 was a museum ship, sold for scrap on 10 September 1964 & broke-up in 1966

Ex- (Germany) Type 401 (Rhein-class fast attack craft tender):

  - TCG Cezayirli Gazi Hasan Paşa (A-579) (i) ex- A69 Donau
  - TCG Cezayirli Gazi Hasan Paşa (A-579) (ii) ex- A61 Elbe

Ex- (Germany) Type 402 (Mosel class fast minesweeper tender)

  - TCG Sokullu Mehmet Paşa (A-577) ex A54 Isar - retired

== Training boats ==
- E-class training boat - all active
  - TCG E-1 (A-1531)
  - TCG E-2 (A-1532)
  - TCG E-3 (A-1533)
  - TCG E-4 (A-1534)
  - TCG E-5 (A-1535)
  - TCG E-6 (A-1536)
  - TCG E-7 (A-1537)
  - TCG E-8 (A-1538)

== Liquid fuel tankers ==
- Çınar-class coastal tanker (Germany FW 1 class):
  - TCG Çınar (A-581) ex FW-1
  - TCG Söğüt (A-598) ex FW-2
  - TCG Kavak (A-600) ex FW-4
- TCG Akpınar (A-574) ex USS Chiwaukum (AOG-26)
- TCG İnebolu (A-575) ex Germany Bodensee
- Van-class water tanker:
  - TCG Van (A-579)
  - TCG Ulabat (A-580)
- TCG Taşkızak (A-570) - active as of June 15, 2006
- TCG Binbaşı Sadettin Gürcan (A-573)
- Albay Hakkı Burak-class liquid fuel tanker:
  - TCG Albay Hakkı Burak (A-571)
  - TCG Yüzbaşı İhsan Tolunay (A-572)
- Akar-class fleet support ship: - active
  - TCG Akar (A-580)
  - TCG Yarbay Kudret Güngör (A-595)

== Dry cargo ships ==
- Karadeniz Ereğlisi-type dry cargo ship (Kanarya class):
  - TCG Şarköy (A-591)
  - TCG Karadeniz Ereğlisi (A-592)
  - TCG Eceabat (A-593)

== Salvage ships ==
- Akın-class submarine rescue ship ( (United States) Chanticleer class):
  - TCG Akın (A-585) Ex-USS Greenlet (ASR-10) - decommissioned on 17 November 2017
- Alemdar-class submarine rescue ship
  - TCG Alemdar (A-582) - active
- Işın-class salvage ship ( (United States) Escape class)
  - TCG Işın (A-589) Ex-USS Safeguard (ARS-25) - decommissioned on 30 March 2017 & sunk as target in June 2021
- Kemer-class salvage assistance ship (Ex- (France) Mercure class):
  - TCG Kemer (A-582) Ex-West Germany M-1255 Passau

== Tugs ==
- Akbaş-class offshore tug (Ex- (Russia) Almaz class):
  - TCG Akbaş (A-586)
- Kurtaran-class offshore tug (Ex- (United States) Penguin class submarine rescue ship):
  - TCG Kurtaran (A-584) Ex-USS Bluebird (ASR-19) - sunk during a training exercise on 15 September 2000
- Gazal class (Ex- (United States) Navajo-class fleet tug):
  - TCG Gazal (A-587) Ex-USS Sioux (ATF-75) - decommissioned in December 2017 & destroyed as a target ship on December 27, 2023
- Değirmendere-class offshore tug (Ex- (France) Tenace class):
  - TCG Değirmendere (A-576) Ex-French Centaure (A674) - active
- Darıca-class offshore tug:
  - TCG Darıca (A-578)
- Aksaz-class offshore tug (Ex- (East Germany) Type 414 harbour tug):
  - TCG Aksaz (A-583)
- İnebolu-class offshore tug (Ex- (United States) Powhatan-class fleet ocean tug):
  - TCG İnebolu (A-590) Ex- (United States) USNS Powhatan (T-ATF-166) - active

== Net laying ships ==
- USA
  - TCG Ağ-4 (P-304) ex-USS Larch (AN-21) Aloe-class net laying ship:
- USA - Germany AN-103-class
  - TCG Ağ-5 (P-305), ex AN-103 - active
- USA - Netherlands AN-93-class
  - TCG Ağ-6 (P-306), ex HNLMS Cerberus (A895) - active

== Survey ships ==
- Yunus-class electronic survey ship (Germany Type 422B class):
  - TCG Yunus (A-590) ex-Alster
- Deney-class survey ship
- Çeşme-class hydrographic and oceanographic survey ship (USA Silas Bent class):
  - TCG Çeşme - active
  - TCG Çandarlı - active
- Çubuklu-class hydrographic and oceanographic survey ship
  - TCG Çubuklu (A-594)

== Repair ships ==
- TCG Başaran (A-582) Ex-USS Patroclus (ARL-19) - decommissioned 22 April 1993 & scrapped in September 1993

== Troop transport ship ==
- İskenderun-class troop transport ship:
  - TCG İskenderun (A-1600)
