= List of equipment of the Turkish Naval Forces =

The equipment of the Turkish Naval Forces.

== Weapon systems ==
Weapon	Image	Origin	Type	Notes
Missiles/bombs
Atmaca		Turkey	Anti-ship missile Surface-to-surface missile	Used by Ada and Istif class. Four modernized Gabya class frigates alongside three Ada-class corvettes and the Barbaros-class frigates under modernisation will be fitted with the missiles by the end of 2027’s first quarter.
A/U/RGM-84 HARPOON	USS Lawrence (DDG 4) launching a RGM-84A Harpoon	United States	Anti-ship missile Surface-to-surface missile	Will be replaced by Atmaca. Sub version its used by Preveze and Gür class 209/1400.
AGM-119 Penguin	Pngnsh60	Norway	Anti-ship missile	MK. MOD 7 is used by SeaHawk helicopters while MK. MOD 1 is used by Kılıç class and other FACs.
Sea Skua		United Kingdom	Anti-ship missile Air-to-surface missile	Used by AB-212 helicopters.
AS.12		France	Surface-to-surface missile Air-to-surface missile	Used by AB-212 helicopters.
AGM-114K Hellfire II		United States	Air-to-surface missile Surface-to-surface missile	Used by S-70 Seahawk helicopters.
UMTAS & L-UMTAS		Turkey	Air-to-surface missile	Integrated on S-70 Seahawk helicopters.
Roketsan Cirit		Turkey	Air-to-surface missile	Used by AH-1W Super Cobra attack helicopter.
Roketsan MAM		Turkey	Laser guided bombs	MAM C, L and T are used by Uavs.
SAM and SSM systems		Turkey		
ZIPKIN PMADS		Turkey	Short-range surface-to-air missile	Uses FIM-92 Stinger missiles and one 12,7mm machine gun mounted on Land Rover Defender.21 vehicles in service
FIM-92 Stinger		United States	MANPAD	
RIM-66 Standard Missile 1	RIM-66 launch from USS Norton Sound (AVM-1) 1983	United States	Medium-range surface-to-air missile	Used by Gabya class.
RIM-162(ESSM)	US Navy 100723-N-5528G-014 An Evolved Sea Sparrow missile is launched from the aircraft carrier USS Carl Vinson (CVN 70)	United States	Medium-range surface-to-air missile Surface-to-surface missile	Used by Barbaros and Gabya class.
RIM 7P/M Sea Sparrow		United States	Medium-range semi-active radar homing air-to-air missile	Used by Yavuz class.
SAPAN	-	Turkey	Medium-range surface-to-air missile	Naval variant of Hisar O+ RF missile, which will be used by TCG Istanbul and remaining İstif class frigates and hisar offshore patrol ships.
SİPER	-	Turkey	Long-range surface-to-air missile	SİPER Block 1 will be used by TCG İstanbul and remaining İstif class frigates.
Naval weapons
MK 45 127mm	USS Lake Erie Cruiser – Mk 45 Gun Stern	United States	Naval gun	Used by Barbaros and Yavuz class.
OTO Melara Super Rapid & Compact 76mm	OTO Melara 76mm gun mounted on JS Hayabusa(PG-824) left front view at JMSDF Maizuru Naval Base July 27, 2014	Italy	Naval gun	
CADAM 100mm		France	Naval gun	Used by Burak class .
BOFORS 40mm		Sweden	Naval gun	Used by Tuzla class.
MKE 76 mm/62-caliber gun	-	Turkey	Naval gun	National Naval Cannon can shoot 80 shots per minute in 5 different shooting modes. Used by TCG Beykoz and TCG Gaziantep.
Aselsan Stamp-2	-	Turkey	Remote controlled weapon station	Integrated on Gabya class.
Aselsan Stop	-	Turkey	Remote controlled weapon station	
Aselsan Muhafız	-	Turkey	Remote controlled weapon station	Used by Tuzla class.
Meteksan Nazar(LETS)	-	Turkey	Laser Electronic Attack System	It can destroy missiles with electro-optical seeker heads such as TV, IR, IIR, etc. with laser. Used by TCG Gökova.
M-134 Minigun		United States	Rotary medium machine gun	Integrated on Gabya class.
Bofors L-70 40mm		Sweden United Kingdom	Multi-purpose autocannon	Used by the Amphibious Marine Brigade
Close in weapons systems
RIM-116A	RIM-116 RAM Shot	United States; Germany	SAM-based CIWS	Used by Ada class. US approved the sale of 94 Mk 44 MOD 4 missiles, 3 Mk 47 MOD 9 telemeter missiles, and 1 blast test vehicle. The sale of RAM guided missiles was approved for 100 million euros.
Aselsan GÖKDENİZ	A Scale Model of the Gokdeniz	Turkey	CIWS	Used by TCG Istanbul frigate and TCG TCG Derya ship.
PHALANX	Phalanx CIWS Block 1B Full Sized USS Elrod FFG-55	United States	CIWS	
Sea Zenith	-	Switzerland	CIWS	
OTO Melara DARDO		Italy	CIWS	Used by Tuzla class and Kılıç class.
Torpedoes
Akya	-	Turkey	Heavyweight Torpedo	Training torpedo - in service Warfare torpedo - On-going deliveries
Mark 24 TigerFish		United Kingdom	Heavyweight Torpedo	Its used by Preveze and Gür class 209/1400.
DM2A4	-	Germany	Heavyweight Torpedo	Its used by 209/1400. The sale of 28 more DM2A4 SeaHake torpedoes was approved for 156 million euros.
SST4	-	Germany	Anti-Submarine Warfare Torpedo	Its used by 209/1400. The sale of 28 more DM2A4 SeaHake torpedoes was approved for 156 million euros.
Mark 54		United States	Lightweight Torpedo	Used from aircraft and helicopters.
Mark46		United States	Lightweight Torpedo	Also its used for Anti-Submarine warfare.
A-244	-	Italy	Lightweight Torpedo	Used for Anti-Submarine Warfare.
Mark37		United States	Anti-Ship and Submarine Warfare Torpedo	Used by Atılay class 209/1200 .
Anti-submarine rocket
Roketsan ASW rocket launcher system		Turkey	Anti-submarine rocket	
Drone/Anti-drone systems
STM KARGU		Turkey	Loitering munition	
KANGAL-D		Turkey	Jamming/Blunt (Jammer) System	Kangal-D is naval variant of Drone-Mini/Micro UAV & RFEYP Jamming/Blunt (Jammer) System.

== Aircraft ==
These are aircraft in Turkish Naval Forces command. For other aircraft see List of active aircraft of the Turkish Air Force page.

Aircraft	Image	Origin	Role/Type	Variant	Quantity	Notes
Maritime patrol aircraft(12)
ATR 72		Italy	Maritime Patrol ASW	P-72	6	Built under Meltem-III project by TAI and Alenia Aermacchi.
CASA CN-235	CASA CN235M-100 TurkishAirForce Teknofest2019 (1)	Indonesia Spain	Maritime Patrol	CN-235M-100	6	Built and upgraded under Meltem-I & Meltem-II project by TAI and THALES.
Utility aircraft(3)
ATR 72		Italy	Utility/Transport	C-72	3	Built under Meltem-III project by TAI and Alenia Aermacchi.
Trainer aircraft(4)
SOCATA TB Family		France	Basic trainer	TB-20	4	
Unmanned aerial vehicles(30)
TAI Anka	TAI Anka Teknofest2019 (1)	Turkey	UCAV/Reconnaissance/Surveillance	Anka-B	4	
TAI Anka	TAI Anka Teknofest2019 (1)	Turkey	UCAV/Reconnaissance/Surveillance	Anka-S	4	
Baykar Bayraktar TB2	BayraktarTB2 Teknofest2019 (1)	Turkey	UCAV/Reconnaissance/Surveillance	Bayraktar TB2 UAV	6	
Baykar Bayraktar TB2	BayraktarTB2 Teknofest2019 (1)	Turkey	UCAV/Reconnaissance/Surveillance	Bayraktar TB2 UCAV	13	
TAI Aksungur		Turkey	UCAV/Reconnaissance/Surveillance		3	
Helicopters(87)
Bell AH-1 SuperCobra		United States	Attack helicopter	AH-1W	53	Transferred from Army aviation to Navy.
Sikorsky S-70 Seahawk	Turkish Sikorsky S-70B-28 Seahawk	United States	ASW SAR	S-70B-28	22	
Augusta-Bell AB-212		Italy	ASW	AB-212-ASW	7	
Augusta-Bell AB-212		Italy	Training	AB-212	5	
TAI T625 Gökbey		Turkey	Multirole			57 on order.

== Armoured vehicles ==
Vehicle	Image	Origin	Type	Details
M48 Patton		United States; Turkey	MBT	M48A5T2 variant used by the Amphibious Marine Brigade.
M113		United States; Turkey	APC	M113A2T1 & T2 variants used by the Amphibious Marine Brigade.
Otokar Cobra II		Turkey	IMV	Used by the Amphibious Marine Brigade.
BMC Vuran		Turkey	MRAP	Used by the Amphibious Marine Brigade.
FNSS ZAHA		Turkey	AAV	Used by the Amphibious Marine Brigade. 27 in service: 23 personnel carriers; 2 command control vehicles; 2 rescue vehicles.
Engerek		Turkey	Utility	Used by all units.

== Infantry weapons ==
Model	Image	Origin	Variant	Caliber	Details
Assault/Battle rifles & Carbines
MKE MPT		Turkey	MPT-76	7.62x51mm NATO	Standard issue.
MKE MPT		Turkey	MPT-55	5.56x45mm NATO	Standard issue.
HK G3		West Germany	HK G3 A3/A4	7.62x51mm NATO	Fielded by conscripts.
HK33		West Germany	HK-33E A2/A3	5.56x45mm NATO	Fielded by conscripts.
M4 Carbine		United States	M4A1	5.56x45mm NATO	Used by Underwater Offence (Turkish Armed Forces) and Underwater Defence (Turkish Armed Forces)
Springfield M14		United States	M14	7.62x51mm NATO	It is used to throw inter-ship guide reels on surface platforms with its special barrel adapter.
Machine guns
Rheinmetall MG3		West Germany	MG3	7.62x51mm NATO	Standard issue.
M60		United States	M60E6	7.62x51mm NATO	In limited use.
FN Minimi		Belgium	7.62 T.R Mk.1 Mk.2	5.56x45m NATO	Used by Underwater Offence (Turkish Armed Forces) and Underwater Defence (Turkish Armed Forces)
M249		United States Belgium	M249 SAW Para	5.56x45m NATO	Used by Underwater Offence (Turkish Armed Forces) and Underwater Defence (Turkish Armed Forces)
M2 Browning		United States	M2HB	.50 BMG	Used as stationary.
Sniper rifles
JNG-90		Turkey	Bora-12	7.62x51mm NATO	Standard issue.
KNT-76		Turkey	KNT-76 SASS	7.62x51mm NATO	Standard issue.
SVD Dragunov		Soviet Union	Dragunov	7.62x54mmR	Used by Underwater Offence (Turkish Armed Forces) and Underwater Defence (Turkish Armed Forces)
Remington XM2010		United States	XM2010	.300 Winchester Magnum	Used by Underwater Offence (Turkish Armed Forces) and Underwater Defence (Turkish Armed Forces)
Sig Sauer SSG3000		Germany	SSG3000	7.62x51mm NATO	Used by Underwater Offence (Turkish Armed Forces) and Underwater Defence (Turkish Armed Forces)v
Anti-material rifles
Barret M82		United States	M82A1	.50 BMG	Used by Underwater Offence (Turkish Armed Forces) and Underwater Defence (Turkish Armed Forces)
Barret M95		United States	M95	.50 BMG	Used by Underwater Offence (Turkish Armed Forces) and Underwater Defence (Turkish Armed Forces)
Shotguns
Ithaca Model 37		United States	Model 37	12/16/20/28 gauge	In limited use.
UTAS UTS-15		Turkey	UTS-15	12 gauge	Used by Underwater Offence (Turkish Armed Forces) and Underwater Defence (Turkish Armed Forces)
Submachine guns
SAR 109T		Turkey	109T	9x19mm Parabellum	In limited use.
HK MP5		West Germany	A2/A3/SD/K	9x19mm Parabellum	Standard issue
CZ Scorpion EVO 3		Czech Republic	EVO 3	9x19mm Parabellum	Used by Underwater Offence (Turkish Armed Forces) and Underwater Defence (Turkish Armed Forces)
Handguns
Canik TP9		Turkey	SF/Elite/Mete	9x19mm Parabellum	Standard issue.
Sarsılmaz SAR9		Turkey	SP/Mete	9x19mm Parabellum	Standard issue.
Beretta 92		Italy	92FS	9x19mm Parabellum	Used by Underwater Offence (Turkish Armed Forces) and Underwater Defence (Turkish Armed Forces)
Glock		Austria	Glock 17 Gen.4	9x19mm Parabellum	Used by Underwater Offence (Turkish Armed Forces) and Underwater Defence (Turkish Armed Forces)
Sig Sauer P226		Germany	P226	.40 S&W	Used by Underwater Offence (Turkish Armed Forces) and Underwater Defence (Turkish Armed Forces)
Grenade launchers
Akdaş AK-40GL		Turkey	AK-40GL	40x46mm	Standard issue.
MKEK 40mm		Turkey	MKE 40GL	40x46mm	Standard issue.
MKEK T40		Turkey	T40	40x46mm	In use with G3.
M203		United States	M203	40x46mm	Used by Underwater Offence (Turkish Armed Forces) and Underwater Defence (Turkish Armed Forces)
Mark 19		United States	Mk.19	40x53mm	Used as stationary.

== Future procurement ==
Project name	Type	Country/origin	Notes
Weapons
Levent	SAM-based CIWS	Turkey	LEVENT will be produced in two different configurations : The first configuration will make use of the ship's electro-optic and radar systems, while the second configuration will be a stand-alone system.The Levent air defense system will feature 21 IIR (Imaging Infrared)-guided Sungur-based missiles.
GÖKSUR	SAM-based CIWS	Turkey	The Göksur will operate independently of ship sensors and systems, be armed with 11 missiles, and provide 360-degree coverage through AESA radar and electro-optical sensors.
MKE 20mm close air defense system	CIWS	Turkey	Within the scope of the needs of the Naval Forces Command, Makine Kimya Endüstrisi Anonym Şirketi (MKE A.Ş.) is developing a 20 mm close air defense system (CIWS).
THUNDERBOLT(KAAN) 40mm	CIWS/Naval gun	Turkey	Developed as a domestic alternative to the 40 mm DARDO cannons found in Dost class corvettes in torpedo boats and the Coast Guard Command inventory, the KAAN 40 mm naval gun is aimed to take place in the domestic surface platforms to be built and in the foreign market. It will replace also DARDO CIWS in the inventory of Turkish navy.
TRAKON TARGAN	Remote controlled weapon station	Turkey	Developed by Unirobotics TRAKON TARGAN is specifically designed and developed for naval vessels as a close-in defence weapon system against air and surface targets. TRAKON TARGAN is mounted with 12.7x99mm HMG or 40mm automatic grenade launcher (MK-19). It will be used by Hisar class OPVs.
Gezgin	Cruise missile	Turkey	Under development.
Çakır	Cruise missile	Turkey	Under development.
Orka	Lightweight Torpedo	Turkey	Under development
MALAMAN	Smart Bottom Mine	Turkey	The MALAMAN Project, which was initiated to meet the Smart Bottom Mine needs of the Turkish Naval Forces Command, was launched in 2011. The project is being implemented by Koç Information and Defense Technologies and TÜBİTAK Defense Industry Research and Development Institute (SAGE).
BARBAROS	Coastal defence system	Turkey	4 ATMACA missiles or 6 Çakır missiles can be fired from the Barbaros coastal defense system battery.
Aircraft
Bayraktar TB3	MALE-class Unmanned aerial vehicle	Turkey	Bayraktar TB3 is planned to be used on the Anadolu drone-carrying amphibious assault ship for the first time.
Bayraktar Kızılelma	Unmanned Combat Aircraft	Turkey	Bayraktar KIZILELMA Combat Unmanned Aircraft System (MIUS) will take off and land from TCG Anadolu and similar short-runway LHD type ships.
Hürjet	Light attack aircraft & Jet trainer	Turkey	It will have both a landing capability and a powertrain platform that carries marine, land and air elements.
Helicopter
TAI T929 Atak 2	Attack helicopter	Turkey	It will be developed naval variant of T929.
TAI T925	Utility helicopter	Turkey	10 Ton class utility helicopter will be developed for the navy, it will be suitable with TCG Anadolu.
TAI T625 Gökbey	Utility helicopter	Turkey	There will be naval variant of T625. 57 planned to be procured.

== See also ==
- Military equipment of Turkey
