= Çubuklu =

- Neighbourhood
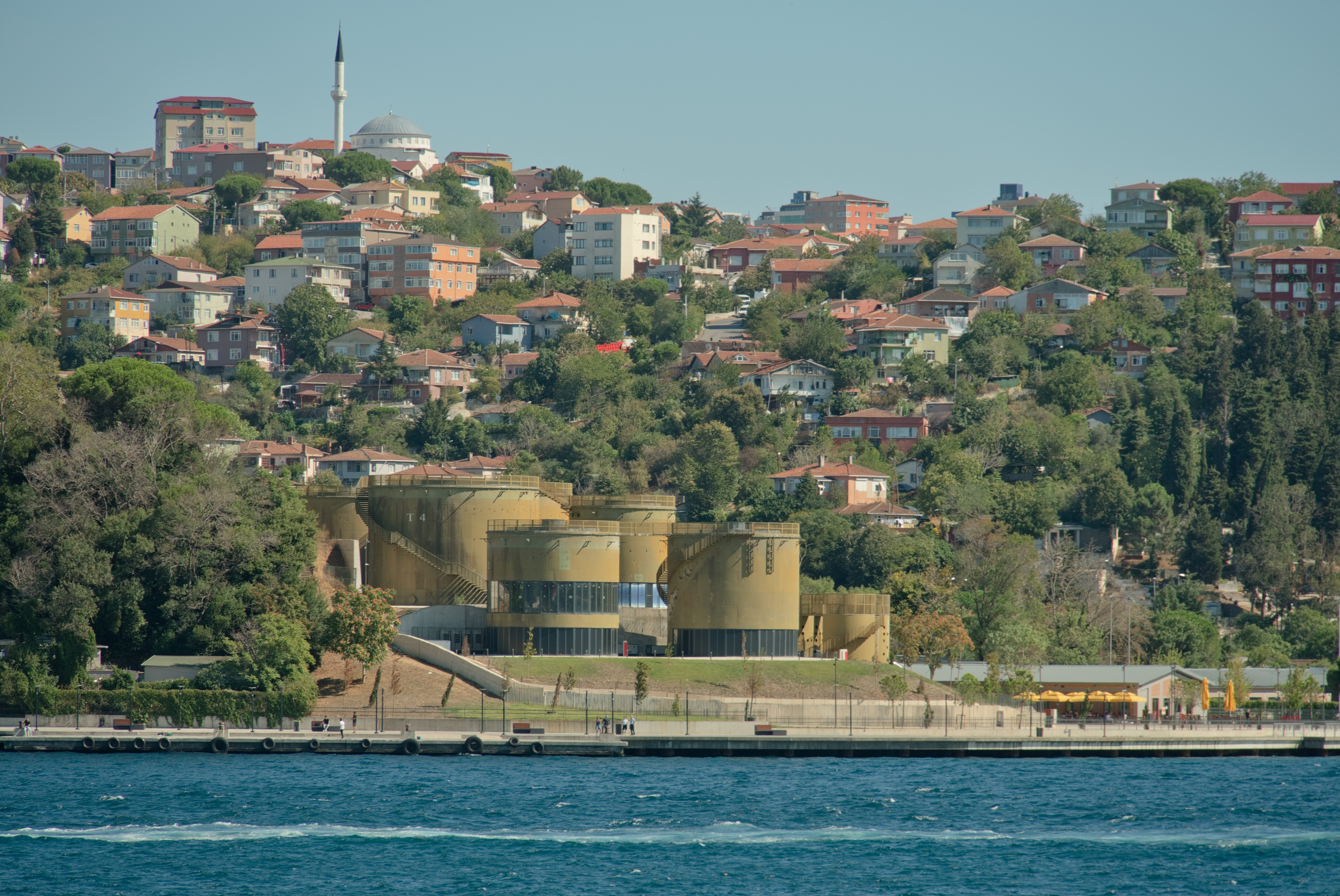

- Location within Turkey Location within Istanbul
- Coordinates: 41°06′27″N 29°04′50″E
- Country: Turkey
- Province: Istanbul
- District: Beykoz
- Population (2022): 20,698
- Time zone: UTC+3 (TRT)
- Postal code: 34805
- Area code: 0216

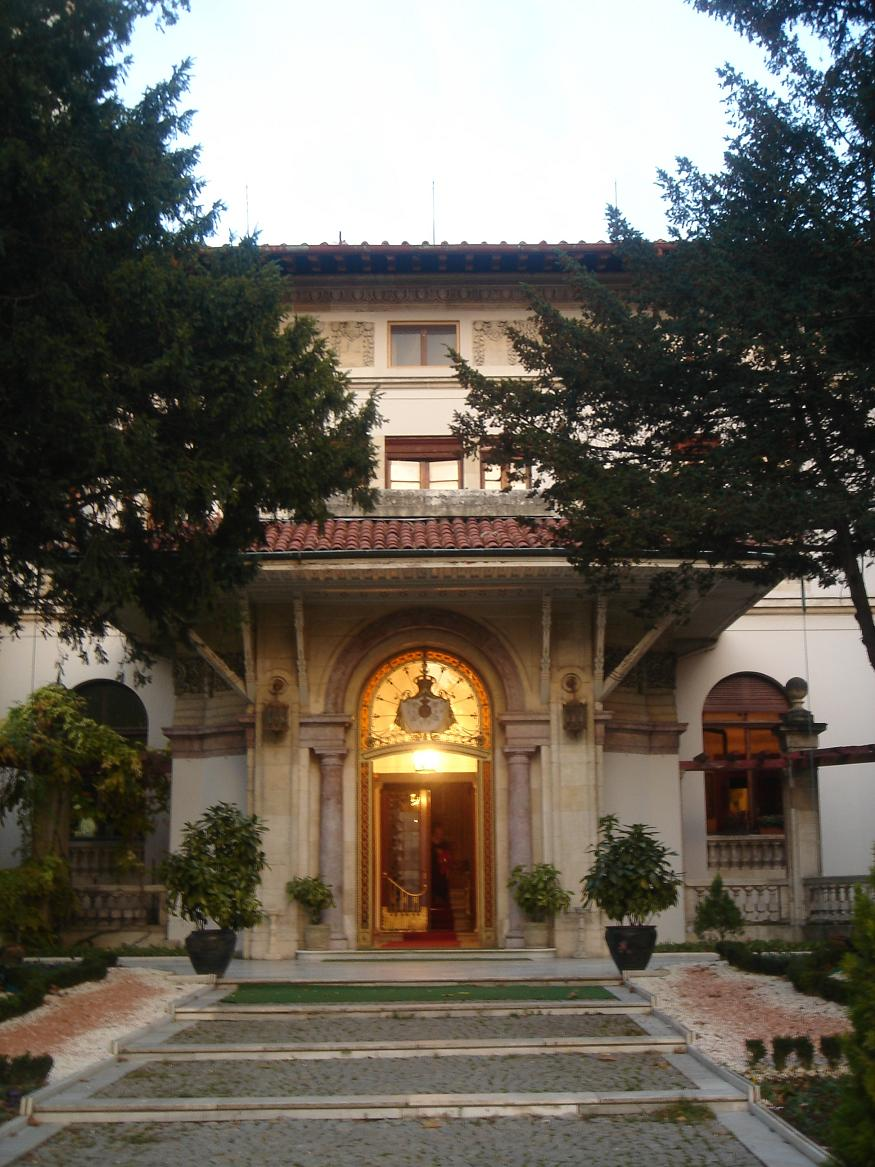
Main gate of Khedive Palace in upper Çubuklu, Istanbul.

Çubuklu is a neighbourhood in the municipality and district of Beykoz, Istanbul Province, Turkey. Its population is 20,698 (2022). It is on the Anatolian side of the Bosphorus. It was called Katangion (Κατάγγιον in Greek) in Byzantine times when it was a recreational area.

During the Ottoman era, some sultans such as Selim I (r. 1494–1511), Suleiman the Magnificent (r. 1520–1566), Ahmed I (r. 1603–1617) and Ahmed III (r. 1703–1730) were particularly interested in Çubuklu. The grand vizier Nevşehirli Damat Ibrahim Pasha (in office 1718–1730) and some other high officials in the 19th century also contributed to its development.

In the 19th century, Çubuklu became a popular residential area. Grand vizier Halil Rifat Pasha (i.o. 1895–1901) built five yalıs (waterfront mansions) here for his sons.

Abbas II of Egypt (r. 1892–1914), the last Khedive (Ottoman viceroy) of Egypt and Sudan, built the Khedive Palace on top of a hill overlooking Çubuklu.

The Underwater Search and Rescue Command, which trains frogmen and divers for the underwater defense (SAS) and underwater offence (SAT) teams, as well as the Office of Navigation, Hydrography and Oceanography of the Turkish Navy, are situated in Çubuklu.

Şehir Hatları calls into the passenger ferry terminus in Çubuklu several times a day. It also runs the car ferry between Çubuklu and İstinye on the European side of the Bosphorus.
