= USNS S. P. Lee =

Oceanographic research ship 1968-92

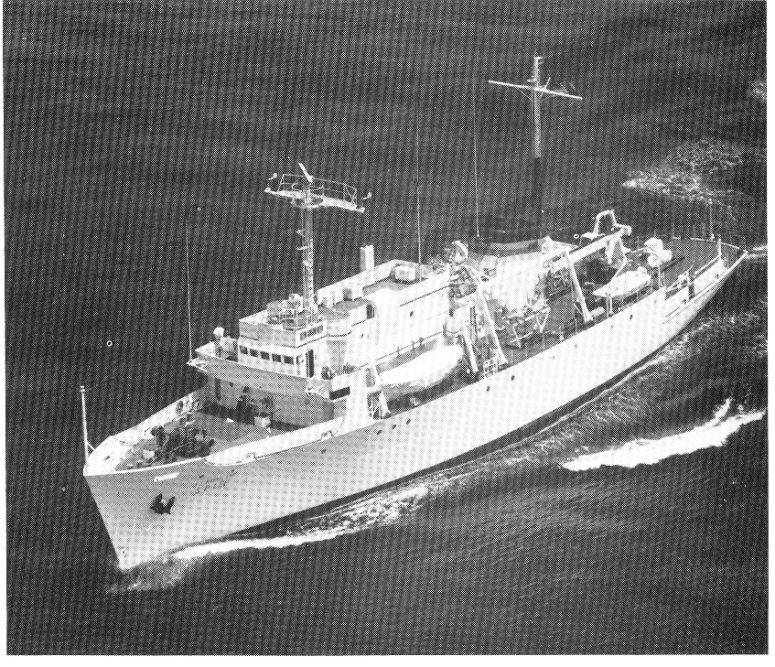

History

United States
- Name: S.P. Lee (1966-1992)
- Namesake: Samuel Phillips Lee
- Builder: Defoe Shipbuilding
- Yard number: 441
- Laid down: 27 June 1966
- Launched: 19 October 1967
- Sponsored by: Mrs. David Scull
- Acquired: 2 December 1968
- Stricken: 1 October 1992
- Identification: IMO number: 8428466
- Notes: Transferred to Mexico, 7 December 1992 under the Security Assistance Program

Mexico
- Name: 1992-2023 ARM Antares; from 2023 ARM Pátzcuaro
- In service: 1992
- Identification: Pennant number: BI-04
- Status: Operational 2023
- Notes: Based Veracruz, Veracruz

General characteristics
- Displacement: 1,297 tons
- Length: 208 ft 4 in (63.50 m)
- Beam: 39 ft (12 m)
- Draft: 14 ft 2 in (4.32 m)
- Speed: 12 kn (22 km/h; 14 mph)
- Complement: 41

USNS S. P. Lee was laid down on 27 June 1966 by the Defoe Shipbuilding Co., Bay City, Michigan as yard hull number 441. (Note: Defoe was soon to build two Navy owned, university operated ships, Melville (T-AGOR-14), Knorr (T-AGOR-15) and two Navy operated ships, Wilkes (T-AGS-33) and Wyman (T-AGS-34). Wilkes and Wyman were larger, but similar in look to the smaller, earlier vessel.) The ship, sponsored by Mrs. David Scull, great-granddaughter of Admiral Lee, was launched on 19 October 1967 and delivered to the navy on 2 December 1968.

S. P. Lee was transferred to the Mexican Navy in 1982 as an oceanographic research ship to become ARM Antares (BI-04). In 2023 she was renamed ARM Pátzcuaro (BI-04).

== Service history ==
Although she had originally been intended to operate under the Oceanographer of the Navy, on 10 September 1968, S. P. Lee was placed under sponsorship of the Naval Underwater Research and Development Center, San Diego, California. Commanded by Capt. Paul L. Sinski, Master, the ship sailed to the Mediterranean and operated out of Naples conducting environmental acoustics tests for the 6th Fleet. For the next four years, but for a period in ready reserve status (7 April to 14 August 1972), she continued to conduct hydrographic operations for the navy in both the Atlantic and Pacific. On 25 September 1970, the ship was reclassified AG-192. S. P. Lee was placed back in ready reserve status on 29 January 1973, and transferred to the United States Geological Survey (USGS) on 27 February 1974. The ship ranged from the Arctic to Antarctic on geology and geophysics missions for the agency.

S.P. Lee (T-AGS-31) was one of the new generation of oceanographic research ships designed and built for that purpose in the 1960s to replace early warship conversions. She is painted white, with the identifying Military Sealift Command funnel bands of black, gold, and blue. Her designation as a civilian-crewed “U.S. Naval Ship,” rather than the “United States Ship” borne by commissioned navy ships, is spelled out on her bow. S.P. Lee's fantail is open to make room for heavy research equipment and the machinery needed to handle it.

The University of Hawaii operated the ship as RV Samuel P. Lee from 1983 to 1992 out of its Marine Expeditionary Center, Snug Harbor, Honolulu, Hawaii as part of the School of Ocean and Earth Science and Technology (SOEST) fleet.

S.P. Lee was returned to the U.S. Navy and struck from the naval register, 1 October 1992. She was transferred to Mexico, 7 December 1992 under the Security Assistance Program.

=== Mexican service ===
The ship became the Buques de Investigación Oceanográfica ARM Antares (BI-04) surveying for the Mexican navy. Antares, along with ARM “Altair” (BI-03) (ex James M. Gilliss (T-AGOR-4)) are listed as operational in 2019 and based in Veracruz. In 2023 she was renamed ARM Pátzcuaro (BI-04).

== See also ==
- Silas Bent-class survey ship
- USNS Wyman (T-AGS-34)
