= TCG Çandarlı =

TCG Çandarlı is the name of the following ships of the Turkish Navy:

- TCG Çandarlı (A 593), ex-HMS Frolic (J406), an Auk-class minesweeper acquired in 1947, converted to a survey ship in the 1960s, stricken in 1986
- TCG Çandarlı (A 588), ex-USNS Kane, a Silas Bent-class survey ship acquired in 2001

== See also ==
- Çandarlı
