= TCG Değirmendere =

Tugboat of the Turkish Navy

History

France
- Name: Centaure
- Builder: Oelkers Werft, Hamburg, Germany
- Launched: 8 January 1974
- Commissioned: 15 November 1974
- Decommissioned: 15 January 1999
- Identification: Code letters FCEN (1974–1999)
- Fate: Transferred to Turkey, 16 March 1999

Turkey
- Name: TCG Değirmandere
- Identification: Code letters TBIS (1999– )
- Status: in active service

General characteristics
- Class & type: Değirmendere-class offshore tug
- Displacement: 1,440 t (1,417 long tons)
- Length: 51.00 m (167 ft 4 in)
- Beam: 11.50 m (37 ft 9 in)
- Draft: 5.70 m (18 ft 8 in)
- Propulsion: 2 × Diesel SACM-WärtsiläUD45V12M4 3,380 kW (4,530 hp); 1 × four-bladed Kort nozzle controllable-pitch propeller
- Speed: 13.5 knots (15.5 mph; 25.0 km/h)
- Range: 9,500 nmi (17,600 km; 10,900 mi) at 13 knots (15 mph; 24 km/h)
- Complement: 30 (2 officers, 15 petty officers and 13 enlisted)
- Sensors & processing systems: 1 × Inmarsat, DRBN-34 (Racal Decca) navigation and landing radars
- Armament: 2x 12.7 mm machine guns

TCG Değirmendere (A-576), ex-Centaure (A674), is a Değirmendere-class offshore tugboat in the Turkish Navy. Built in Germany, she was launched in 1974. Christened Centaure, the tugboat saw service in the French Navy with designation A674 from 1974 until her decommissioning in 1999. The same year, she was sold to Turkey, renamed Değirmendere and went into service in the Turkish Navy under designation A-576.

== History ==
=== French Navy ===
The Centaure (A674) was laid down by Oelkers Werft in Hamburg, West Germany as the second ship of the Tenace-class ocean tugboats (French: Remorqueur de haute mer, RHM) in the French Navy (French: Marine nationale). She was launched on 8 January 1974. After completion of her fitting-out in La Pallice, the port of La Rochelle in France, she was commissioned on 15 November 1974 and joined the navy fleet. Her sister ships are Malabar (A664) and Tenace (A669).

Capable of towing 60 tons at fixed point and breaking 2 m (6.6 ft)-thick ice, she was designed as a salvage tug for the French ballistic missile submarines (French abbreviation SNLE) Redoutable (S611) and Triomphant (S616) in case of damage.

On 5 September 1987, the seaside village Carnac in northwestern France was named the ship's godmother.

The history of the vessel is marked with a rescue effort in 1992 when the crew of the trawler Mab-An-Teck, sinking in stormy sea off the French fishing port Loctudy, were saved. The ship's captain, Lieutenant Viger, was awarded a prize by the "Société Nationale d'Encouragement au Bien".

Centaure was decommissioned on 15 January 1999. During the around 25 years of service in the French Navy, she sailed a total of 447,000 nmi (514,000 mi; 828,000 km) and accomplished 150 tows.

=== Turkish Navy ===
She was transferred to Turkey on 16 March 1999, and renamed Değirmendere after Değirmendere, a town in Gölcük district of Kocaeli Province on the south coast of Izmit Bay. The official handover took place following a tow exercise using the French frigate Commandant L'Herminier (F791) in the military port Brest. On 2 April 1999, Değirmendere left Brest to sail towards her home port in Turkey through Atlantic Ocean and Mediterranean Sea.

==== Drydock accident ====
On 27 November 2013, Değirmendere was taken into a drydock of Alaybey Naval Dockyard in İzmir Province, western Turkey for maintenance and repair works. She capsized during the transfer to the water at 12:50 hours local time (10:50 UTC) on 23 December 2013 following the launching of a minesweeper, which was also in the same drydock for repairs. Within 20 seconds, Değirmendere turned on her starboard in water as keel blocks broke, killing ten and injuring seventeen, who were on board to conduct and supervise the transfer action. One petty officer, seven enlisted of the Navy and two civilian dockyard workers were found dead in the compartments under water by navy divers.

== Characteristics ==
Değirmendere is 51.00 m (167 ft 4 in) long, with a beam of 11.50 m (37 ft 9 in) and a max. draft of 5.70 m (18 ft 8 in). Assessed at 1,440 t (1,417 long tons), the ship is propelled by two SACM-WärtsiläUD45V12M4 3,380 kW (4,530 hp) diesel engines using a four-bladed Kort nozzle controllable-pitch propeller. She has a speed of 13.5 knots (15.5 mph; 25.0 km/h) in service. At 13 knots (15 mph; 24 km/h) speed, she has a range of 9,500 nmi (17,600 km; 10,900 mi).

The auxiliary navy vessel is equipped with Inmarsat and DRBN-34 (Racal Decca) navigation and landing radars. There are two 12.7 mm machine guns installed on board the ship.
