= TCG Alemdar =

Submarine rescue ship

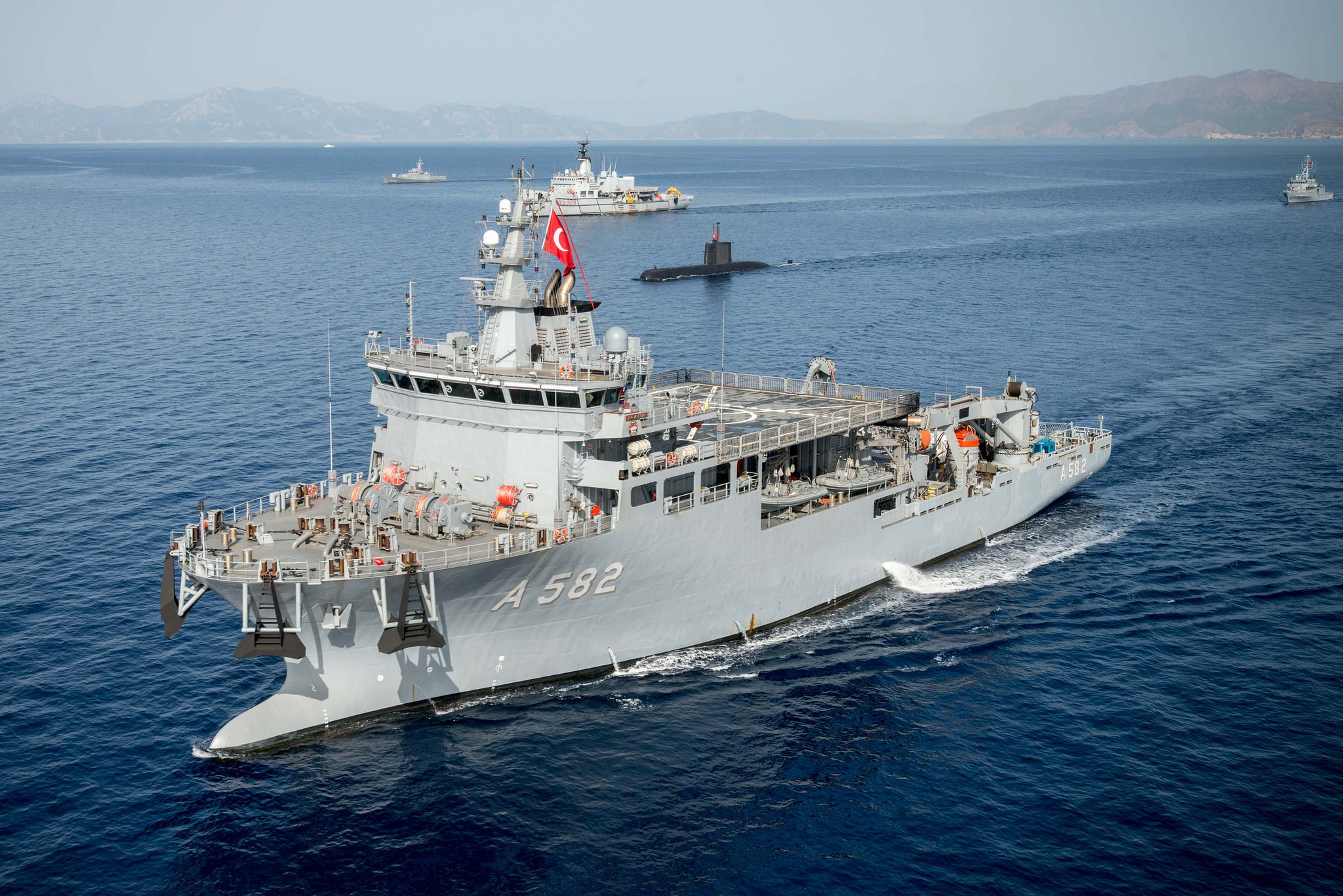

History

Turkey
- Name: TCG Alemdar
- Ordered: October 28, 2011
- Builder: Istanbul Naval Shipyard
- Launched: April 29, 2014
- Commissioned: January 28, 2017
- Identification: Hull number: A-582; MMSI number: 271035214; Callsign: TBDE
- Status: in active service

General characteristics
- Class & type: Alemdar-class submarine rescue mother ship
- Displacement: 4,200 tons
- Length: 91.0 m (298 ft 7 in)
- Beam: 18.5 m (60 ft 8 in)
- Draft: 7.8 m (25 ft 7 in)
- Propulsion: Stern thruster: 2 × 3,250 kW; Retractable thruster: 1 × 1,400 kW; Tunnel thruster: 2 × 770 kW
- Speed: 18 knots (33 km/h; 21 mph) max
- Range: 4,500 nmi (8,300 km; 5,200 mi) at 14 knots (26 km/h; 16 mph)
- Crew: 131

TCG Alemdar (A-582) is an Alemdar-class submarine rescue mother ship (MOSHIP) of the Turkish Navy. Ordered on October 28, 2011, and built by Istanbul Shipyard, she was launched on April 29, 2014.

She is designed to perform subsea and surface search and rescue missions under various sea conditions. Her main task is to rescue submarines that can not resurface by their own efforts. She is able to provide life support to the stranded crew of a distressed submarine at a maximum depth of 600 m (2,000 ft). She is equipped with remotely operated underwater vehicles (ROV) and atmospheric diving suits (ADS). A modern vessel with complex equipment on board, Alemdar will help maintain an appropriate level of salvage and recovery capability for the Turkish Navy's fleet of fourteen diesel-electric submarines.

TCG Alemdar is 91.0 m (298 ft 7 in) long with a beam of 18.5 m (60 ft 8 in) and a max. draft 7.8 m (25 ft 7 in). She has a speed of 18 knots (33 km/h; 21 mph) in service. At 14 knots (26 km/h; 16 mph) speed, she has a range of 4,500 nautical miles (8,300 km; 5,200 mi).

== See also ==
- Underwater Search and Rescue Group Command (Turkey)
