= Underwater Search and Rescue Group Command (Turkey) =

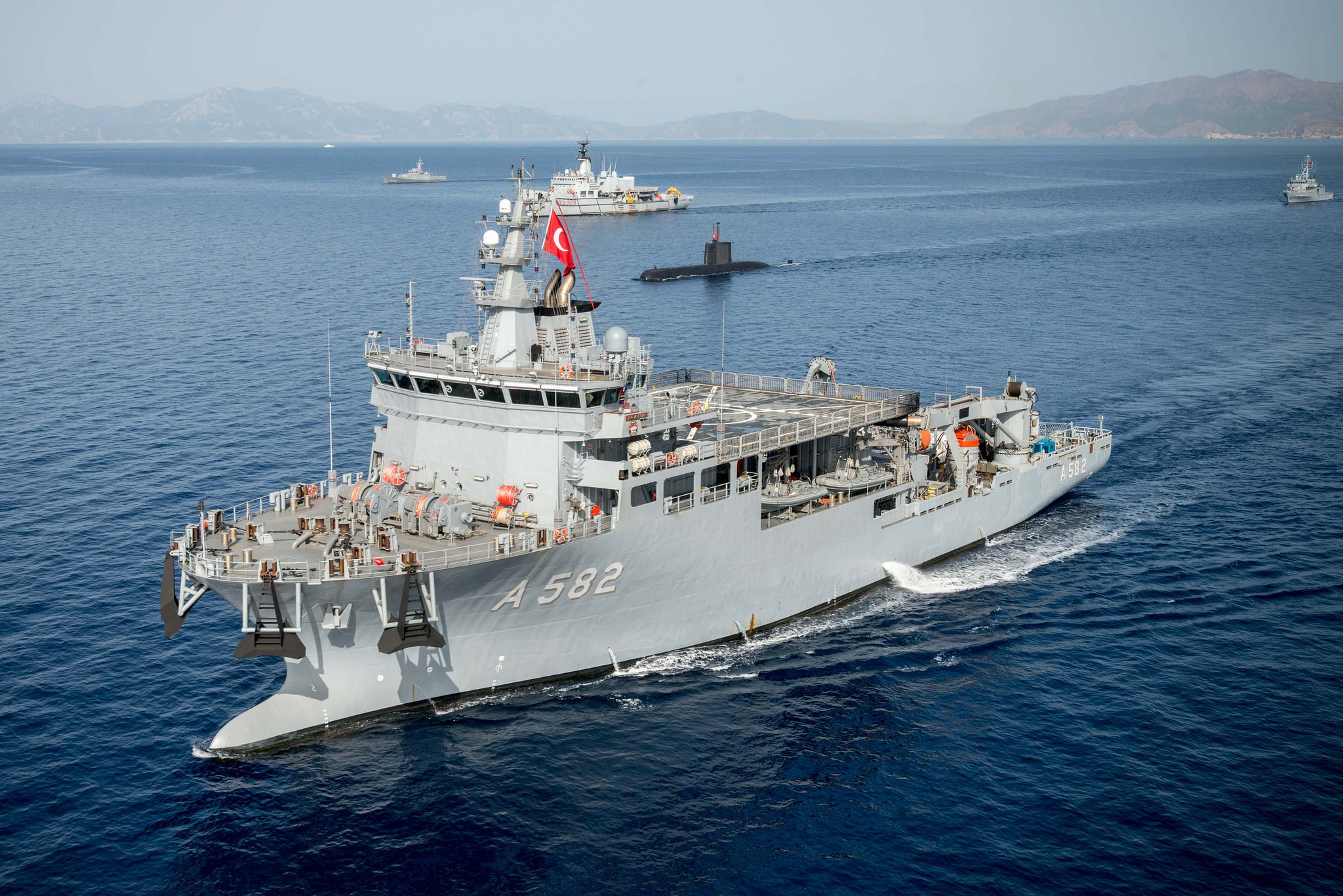
TCG Alemdar (A582)

The Underwater Search and Rescue Group Command is affiliated with the Turkish Naval Forces. Its duties are to carry out underwater training of the Naval Forces Command and other units, to train 1st class divers and underwater defense personnel, and to participate in search and rescue activities at times of war and peace. In 2017, the TCG Alemdar was put into service and the capabilities of the unit were upgraded.

Search and rescue activities can be carried out up to a depth of 600 meters.

With the Atmospheric Diving System, divers, who can go as far down as 365 meters, can provide life packages and air support to submarines.

== Affiliated Troops ==
- Underwater Defence (Turkish Armed Forces)
- Underwater Offence (Turkish Armed Forces)

== See also ==
- Turkish Naval Forces
- TCG Alemdar
- Underwater searches
