= USS Patroclus =

1944 LST-542-class tank landing ship

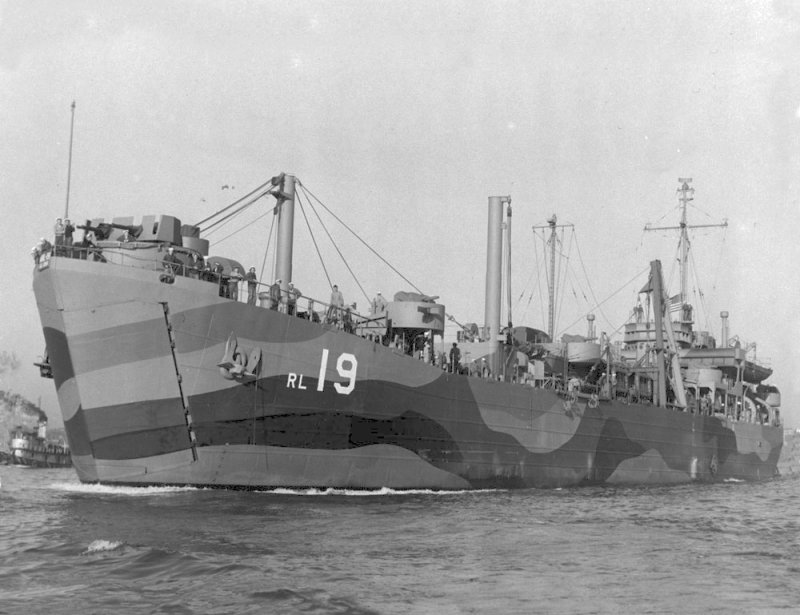
- USS Patroclus (ARL-19) in the harbor at Baltimore, Maryland, 18 April 1945, after completion of conversion from an LST to an ARL.

History

United States
- Name: LST-955; Patroclus
- Namesake: Patroclus
- Builder: Bethlehem-Hingham Shipyard, Hingham, Massachusetts
- Yard number: 3425
- Laid down: 22 September 1944
- Launched: 22 October 1944
- Commissioned: 13 November 1944, partial commission; 17 April 1945, full commission
- Decommissioned: 27 November 1944; 2 October 1946
- Stricken: 22 August 1952
- Identification: Hull symbol: LST-955; Hull symbol: ARL-19; Code letters: NKFI
- Fate: Laid up in the Atlantic Reserve Fleet, Green Cove Springs, Florida; Transferred to Turkey, 15 November 1952

Turkey
- Name: Basaran
- Namesake: City of Başaran, Kuyucak
- Acquired: 15 November 1952
- Identification: Hull symbol: A-582
- Fate: Scrapped, September 1993

General characteristics
- Class & type: LST-542-class tank landing ship; Achelous-class repair ship
- Displacement: 3,900 long tons (4,000 t) light; 4,100 long tons (4,200 t) full load
- Length: 328 ft (100 m) oa
- Beam: 50 ft (15 m)
- Draft: 11 ft 2 in (3.40 m)
- Installed power: 2 × 900 hp (670 kW) Electro-Motive Diesel 12-567A diesel engines; 1,800 shp (1,300 kW)
- Propulsion: 1 × Falk main reduction gears; 2 × Propellers
- Speed: 11.6 kn (21.5 km/h; 13.3 mph)
- Complement: 22 officers, 233 enlisted men
- Armament: 1 × 3 in (76 mm)/50 caliber dual purpose gun; 2 × quad 40 mm (1.57 in) Bofors guns (with Mark 51 director); 6 × twin 20 mm (0.79 in) Oerlikon cannons

USS Patroclus (ARL-19) was laid down as a United States Navy LST-542-class tank landing ship but converted to one of 39 Achelous-class repair ships that were used for repairing landing craft during World War II. Named for Patroclus (a Homeric character; a beloved of Achilles, slain by Hector while fighting in Achilles' armor), she was the only US Naval vessel to bear the name.

== Construction ==
LST–955 was laid down on 22 September 1944, at Hingham, Massachusetts, by the Bethlehem-Hingham Shipyard; launched 22 October 1944; and placed in reduced commission 13 November 1944, to proceed to Baltimore, Maryland; decommissioned on 27 November; converted to an ARL at the Bethlehem Key Highway Shipyard; and commissioned in full 17 April 1945.

== Service history ==
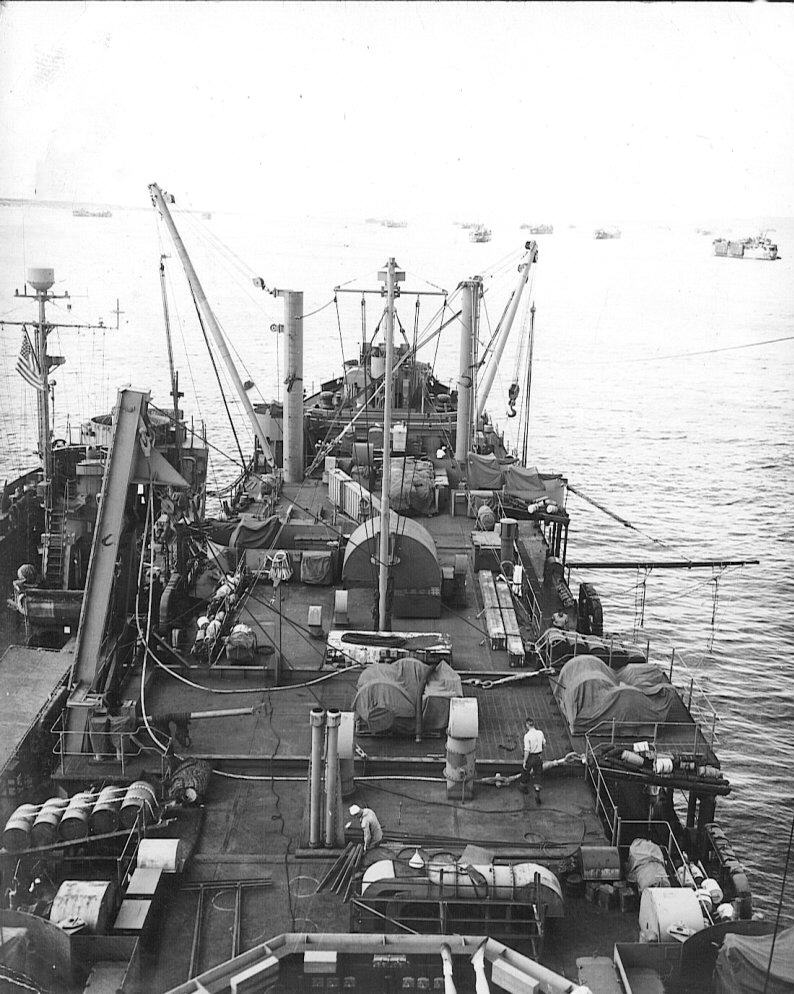
USS Patroclus (ARL-19) anchored at Tinian, Marianas Islands with an unidentified LSM alongside to port, date unknown. Prominent in this view is the ship's 15- and 20-ton booms as well as the 60-ton A-frame boom.

Following shakedown in Chesapeake Bay, Patroclus departed the east coast 22 May 1945, transited the Panama Canal, and steamed to San Francisco for final outfitting. Steaming westward 2 July, the landing craft repair ship arrived at Saipan 7 August, and reported for duty with Serv Div 103. On 27 August, she continued on to Tokyo Bay, to provide repair facilities for occupation force vessels. Assigned to Tokyo Bay, she witnessed the formal surrender of Japan on 2 September, then commenced repair work on all LSMs, LCIs, LCSs, and LSTs in the area. On 7 April 1946, Patroclus was relieved by USS Romulus and on 8 April, she departed for the east coast of the United States and inactivation.

Decommissioned 2 October 1946, Patroclus was berthed at Green Cove Springs, Florida, as a unit of the Atlantic Reserve Fleet until November 1951. Then, transferred to the custody of the 6th Naval District, she underwent conversion prior to transfer under the Military Assistance Program. Struck from the Naval Vessel Register 22 August 1952, she was transferred to Turkey, on 15 November 1952, where she served that nation as TCG Basaran (A 582). She was scrapped in September 1993.

== Bibliography ==
Online resources

- "Patroclus". Dictionary of American Naval Fighting Ships. Naval History and Heritage Command. 19 August 2015. This article incorporates text from this source, which is in the public domain.
- "Bethlehem-Hingham, Hingham MA". ShipbuildingHistory.com. 11 August 2011.
- "USS Patroclus (ARL-19)". NavSource. 6 December 2013.
