= Underwater Defence =

Special operations unit of the Turkish Navy

Underwater Defence Group Command
- Su Altı Savunma Grup Komutanlığı (SAS)
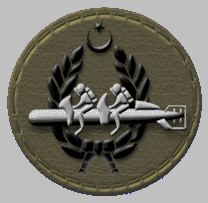
- Active: 1963–present
- Country: Turkey
- Allegiance: Turkish Armed Forces
- Branch: Turkish Naval Forces
- Type: Explosive Ordnance Disposal
- Role: Defuse mines or unexploded torpedoes; Disable enemy vessels; Amphibious Assault; Bomb Squad
- Mottos: "Fire, Gunpowder and Us."
- Engagements: Battle of Tillyria (allegedly) Operation Atilla Imia/Kardak Military crisis KFOR mine clearance operation UNIFIL Operation Euphrates Shield Operation Olive Branch Operation Peace Spring

Insignia
- Abbreviation: S.A.S.

The Underwater Defence (Turkish: Su Altı Savunma), or SAS, is the one and only EOD (Explosive Ordnance Disposal) unit of the Turkish Navy, based in the Foça Naval Base near İzmir, on the Aegean coast of Turkey

The missions of the Su Altı Savunma (SAS) include coastal defence operations, such as clearing mines or unexploded torpedoes, and disabling enemy IEDs.

== History ==
The first S.A.S. unit was established in 1964 in the city of Istanbul, The original name of the S.A.S. unit was Su Altı Müdafaa (S.A.M.) and is bound to the Kurtarma ve Sualtı Komutanlığı (K.S.K.), or Rescue and Underwater Command.

== Mission ==
Their main tasks are:

- Deactivation or disposal of explosive material, mines and/or unidentified ordnance under the water off the friendly ports and coasts.
- Deactivation or disposal of explosive material, mines and/or unidentified ordnance under the water off the target coasts or ports. That includes clearing of the target beaches of mines, explosives, booby traps and tank traps, prior to the amphibious assault of the friendly forces.
- Deactivation or disposal of explosives and mines that might be present on the course of the friendly troops and/or VIP military personnel.
- Consultancy in defending the strategic facilities against stealth assaults by enemy commandos.

SAS units do not perform assault, counter-terrorism, recon or CQC missions. A real-time duty executed by the SAS has been the clearing of the Girne Beach, Cyprus, prior to the amphibious assault of the Turkish Armed Forces to the island in 1974.

== Equipment ==
Handguns

- SIG P226
- Glock

Submachine Guns

- H&K MP5A3

Assault Rifles

- M4 carbine
- MPT-55

Machine Guns

- FN Minimi
- M60 machine gun
- M134

Sniper Rifles

- Barrett M82A1
- Barrett M95
- MKEK JNG-90
- Remington XM2010
- CheyTac Intervention
- McMillan TAC-50

Anti-Materiel Rifles

- Barrett M82A1
- MKEK JNG-90

Rockets & Explosives

- RPG7
- M72 LAW
- M203
- M79

== See also ==
- Underwater Offence (Turkish Armed Forces)
- Underwater Search and Rescue Group Command (Turkey)
