= CZ Scorpion Evo 3 =

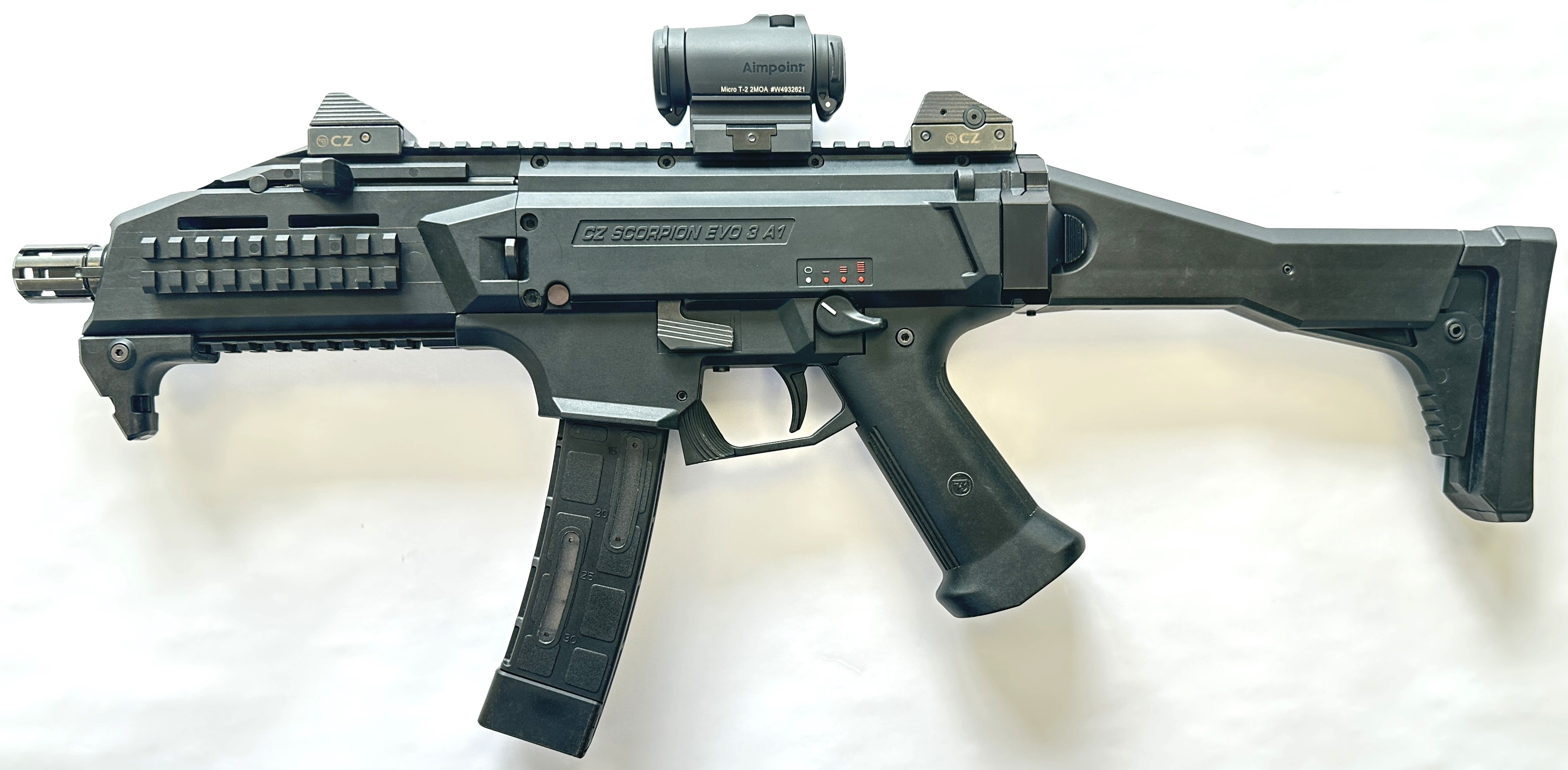
- CZ Scorpion EVO 3 A1
- Type: Submachine gun, pistol caliber carbine
- Place of origin: Czech Republic

Service history
- In service: 2009–present
- Used by: See Users

Production history
- Manufacturer: Česká zbrojovka Uherský Brod
- Produced: 2009–present

Specifications
- Mass: 2.61 kg (5.8 lb) with no magazine
- Length: 675 mm (26.6 in) (stock unfolded), 420 mm (17 in) (stock folded)
- Barrel length: 196 mm (7.7 in) pistol, 412 mm (16.2 in) carbine/rifle
- Width: 60 mm (2.4 in)
- Height: 215 mm (8.5 in) with sights folded and no magazine
- Cartridge: 9×19mm Parabellum; .22 long rifle
- Action: Blowback
- Rate of fire: 1150 rounds/min
- Muzzle velocity: 370 m/s (1,200 ft/s)
- Feed system: 10-, 20-, 30-, 35-round detachable box magazine, 50-round drum magazine, 100-round Beta C-Mag.
- Sights: Picatinny Rails for optics, backup iron sights

The CZ Scorpion EVO 3 is a 9mm firearm platform manufactured by Česká zbrojovka Uherský Brod with a variant S1 available as a pistol, a carbine, or a short-barreled rifle, and a select-fire submachine gun variant A1. The EVO 3 designation denotes that the firearm is a third generation of CZ's line of small submachine guns started by the Škorpion vz. 61, which is mechanically unrelated.

== Design details ==
The Scorpion EVO 3 is a blowback-operated carbine evolved from a Slovak prototype submachine gun developed by Laugo.

Chambered in 9×19mm Parabellum, the Scorpion EVO 3 is mostly polymer, making it a lightweight, compact submachine gun designed to be easily manoeuvred in confined spaces. It features a left-side non-reciprocating charging handle, although it can be switched to the right side during disassembly.

The select-fire A1 variant comes equipped with a folding, adjustable and fully removable stock for transport. The handguard is lined with multiple Picatinny rails for the addition of attachments such as grips, sights, flashlights, and lasers.

The handguard on the semi-automatic S1 variant features M-LOK attachment points, with a single Picatinny rail on top.

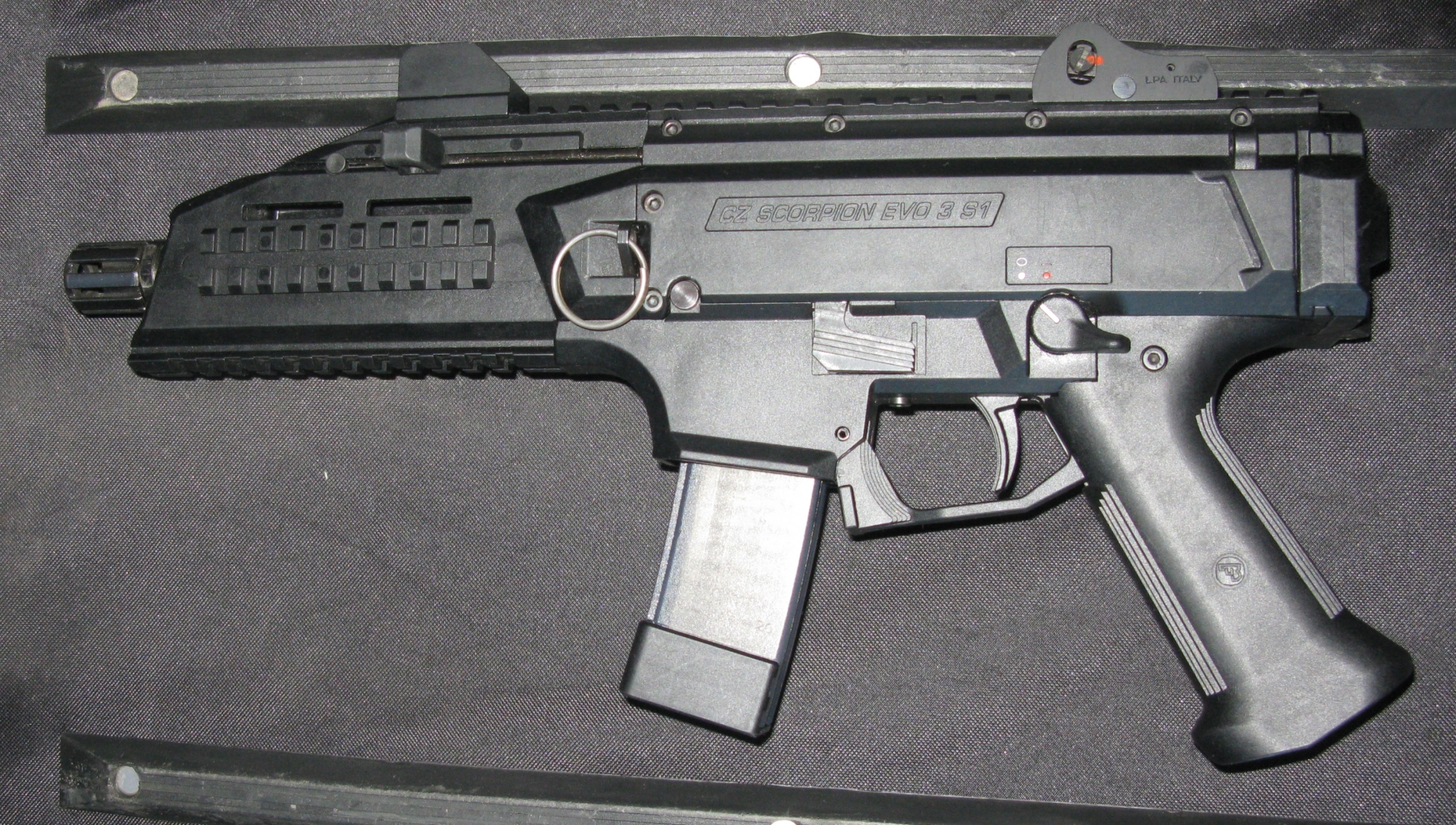
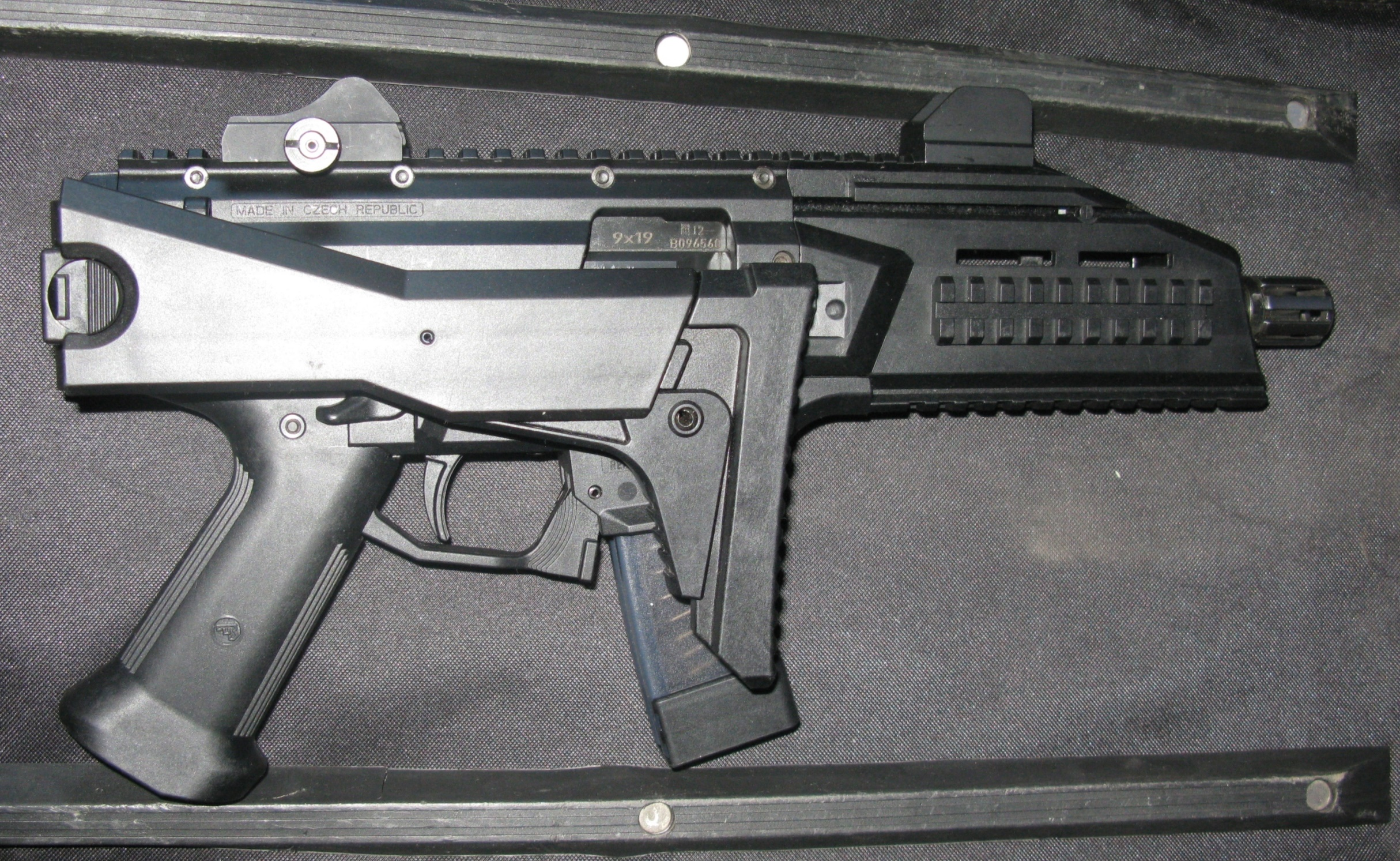
9 mm semi-auto CZ Scorpion EVO 3 S1 pistol, left-side and right-side views

== Users ==
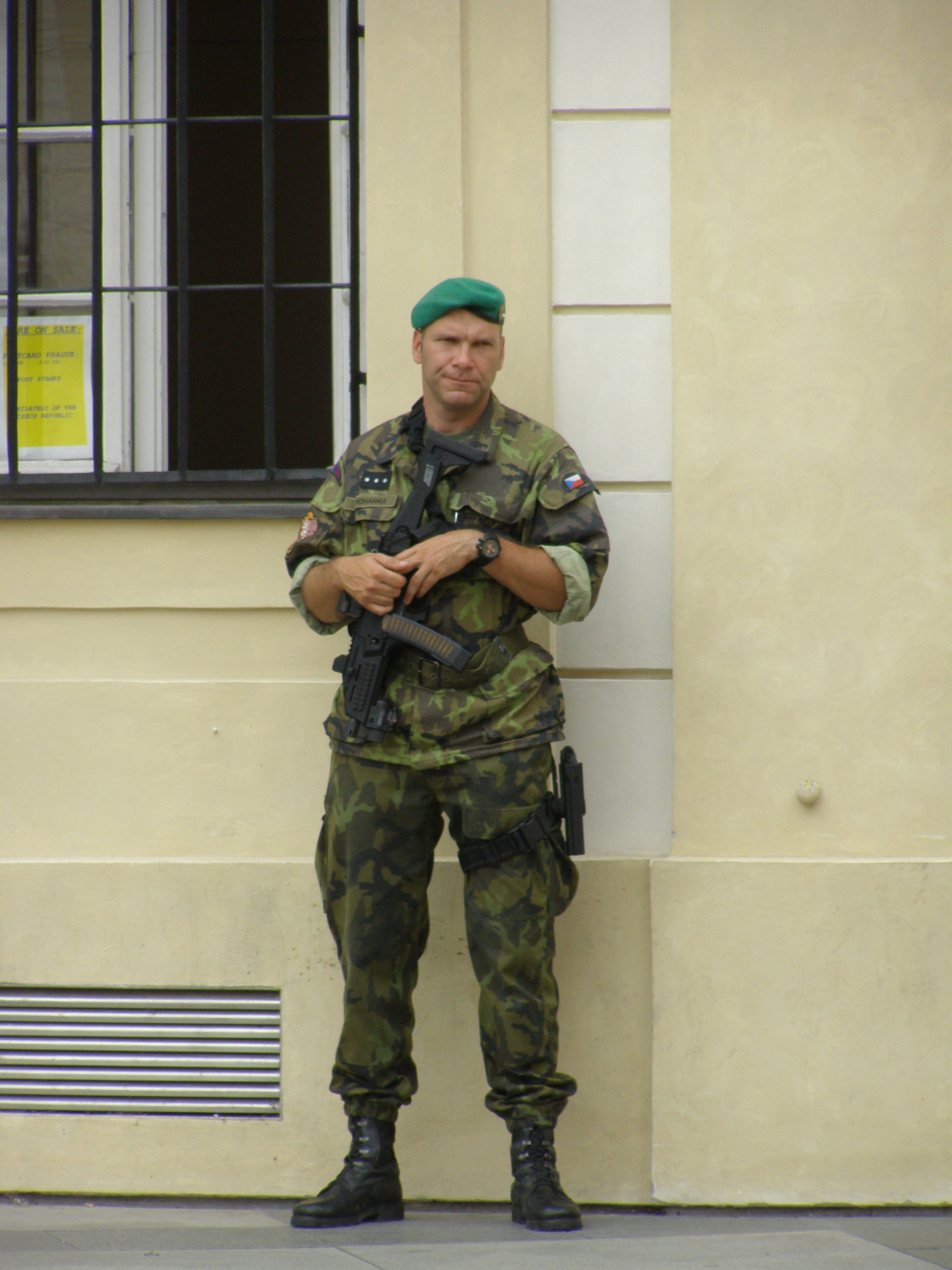
CZ Scorpion Evo 3 with Prague Castle Guard

=== Current users ===
- Argentina: Federal Law enforcement, Tucuman Police, San Juan Police
- Armenia: Water Patrol Service
- Bolivia: Armed Forces of Bolivia
- Canada: Toronto Police Service
- Chile: Carabineros de Chile
- Colombia: National Police of Colombia
- Czech Republic: Prague Castle Guard
- Egypt: Law enforcement Units
- Finland: Police of Finland, Finnish Border Guard
- Hungary: Hungarian Police, Hungarian Defence Forces
- India: Uttar Pradesh Police Uttar Anti-Terrorism Squad (UP ATS)
- Indonesia: Indonesian National Police and Indonesian Maritime Security Agency.
- Kenya: Kenya Police Service
- Malaysia: Royal Malaysia Police, Malaysian Maritime Enforcement Agency,
- Mauritius: Mauritius Police Force Special Support Unit, Special Mobile Force (GIPM)
- Philippines: Special Action Force, Philippine Coast Guard Special Operations Force
- Poland: Railway Security Guard (SOK)
- Portugal: Polícia Aérea of the Portuguese Air Force and Polícia Judiciária.
- Romania: Brigada Specială de Intervenție a Jandarmeriei
- Sri Lanka: Special forces
- Thailand: Royal Thai Police
- Turkey: Used by SAT.
- Ukraine: Unknown quantities delivered from the Czech Republic, deployed in combat in the 2022 Russian invasion of Ukraine.
- Uruguay: Used by Uruguayan Air Force
- Vietnam: People's Public Security drug enforcement unit (Bureau C47), Army's Competition Rifle Team, Guards Command (K01)

=== Non-State actors ===
- (Palestine) Izz adin Al-Qassam Brigades

=== Former users ===
- Islamic Republic of Afghanistan: Used by Afghan National Army Commando Corps.

=== Planned procurement ===
- Hong Kong: Planned to purchase about 1,000 submachine guns. Order cancelled by the Czech government due to US Executive Order 13936.
