= USNS Silas Bent =

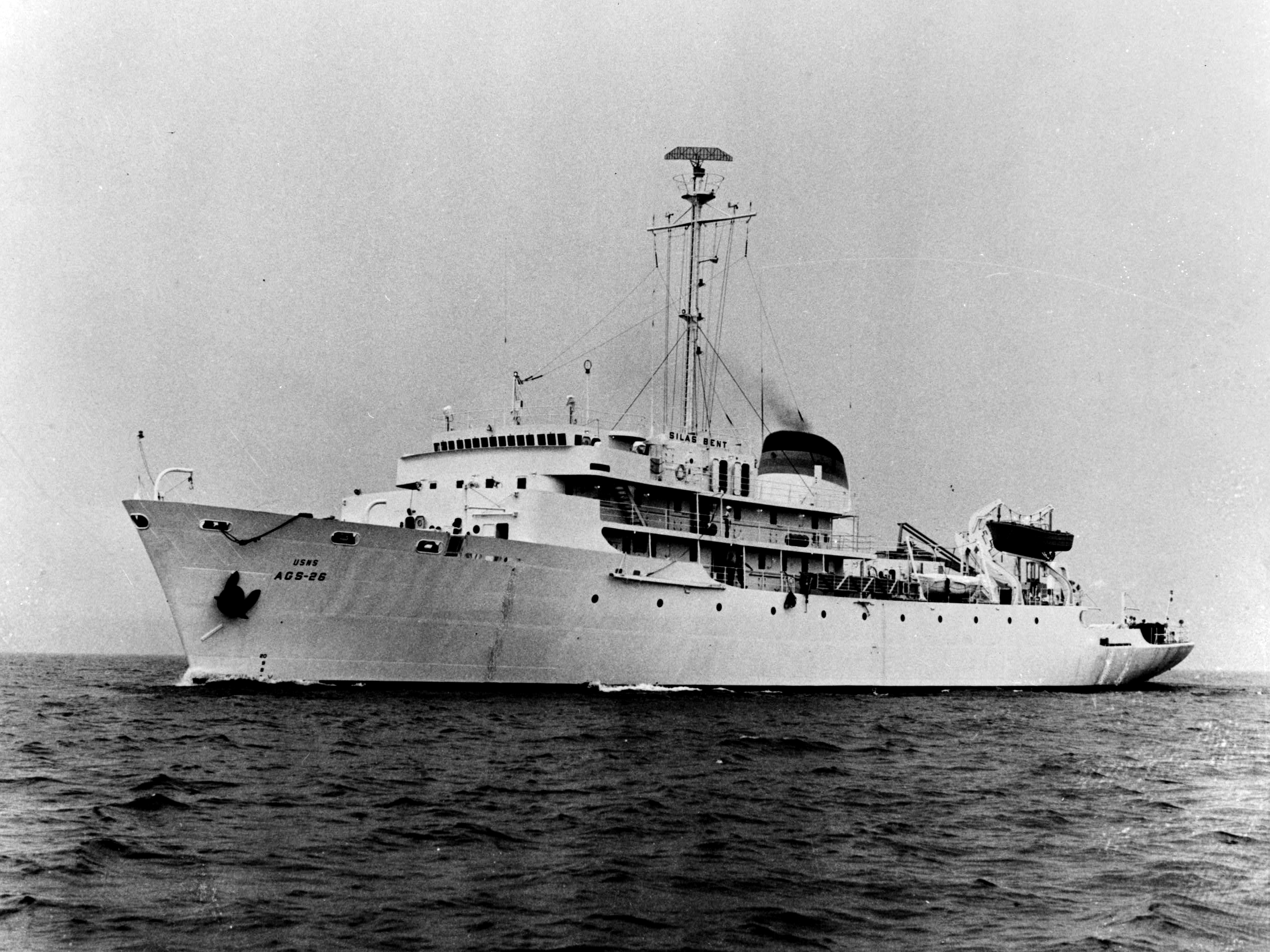
- Silas Bent (AGS-26), on builder's trials, July 1965

History

United States
- Name: Silas Bent
- Namesake: Silas Bent
- Builder: American Shipbuilding Corporation, Cleveland, Ohio
- Laid down: 2 March 1964
- Launched: 16 May 1964
- Sponsored by: Miss Nancy M. McKinley and Mrs. Jeffrey R. Grandy
- Acquired: by the United States Navy, 23 July 1965
- In service: as USNS Silas Bent (T-AGS-26)
- Out of service: 28 October 1999
- Stricken: 28 October 1999
- Identification: IMO number: 7738527
- Honours and awards: National Defense Service Medal
- Fate: transferred to the Navy of Turkey, 29 September 1999 as TCG Çeșme (A-599)

Turkey
- Name: TCG Çeşme
- Namesake: town of Çeşme
- Commissioned: 8 June 2000
- Identification: IMO number: 7738527
- Status: in active service

General characteristics
- Type: Silas Bent class survey ship
- Tonnage: 1,935 tons
- Displacement: 2,550 tons full load
- Length: 285 ft 3.5 in (87.0 m) LOA; 261 ft 4 in (79.7 m) LBP
- Beam: 48 ft (14.6 m)
- Draft: 15 ft (4.6 m)
- Depth: 26 ft 6 in (8.1 m)
- Propulsion: ALCO diesels, Allis-Chalmers electric drive, single shaft. SHP approx. 3000 + 350 SHP trainable and retractable, gas turbine powered, bow propulsion unit to assist station-keeping and ultra-quiet ship operations.
- Speed: 15 kn (17 mph; 28 km/h)
- Range: 12,000 nmi (14,000 mi; 22,000 km) at 12 kn (14 mph; 22 km/h)
- Complement: 12 officers, 32 crew; 34 scientific party
- Armament: None

USNS Silas Bent (T-AGS-26) was a Silas Bent class survey ship acquired by the United States Navy in 1964 and delivered to the Military Sealift Command in 1965. Silas Bent spent her career in the Pacific Ocean performing oceanographic surveys. The ship was equipped with the Oceanographic Data Acquisition System (ODAS) as were the later oceanographic survey ships USNS Kane (T-AGS-27) and USNS Wilkes (T-AGS-33).

== Construction ==
Silas Bent (AGS-26), an oceanographic survey ship, was laid down in March 1964 by the American Shipbuilding Co. at Lorain, Ohio and launched on 16 May 1964 sponsored by sisters and granddaughters of Silas Bent, Miss Nancy M. McKinley and Mrs. Jeffrey R. Grandy. The ship was delivered to the Military Sea Transportation Service (now the Military Sealift Command) in July 1965.

== Oceanographic survey operations ==
Silas Bent—the first of a new class of oceanographic survey ships—was manned by a Civil Service crew and operated by the Military Sealift Command as an integrated system for the gathering of vital oceanographic data in both underway and on-station modes. The data she collected was recorded in a form immediately usable by computers. She was under the technical control of the Naval Oceanographic Office then located in Suitland, Maryland. The oceanographic survey ship completed her shakedown cruise during the winter of 1965 and 1966. The ship was assigned operations including the Navy's ASW/USW Oceanwide Survey Project supporting antisubmarine and undersea warfare weapons systems, primarily in the northern Pacific.

=== Survey examples ===
The ship completed the first full year of ASW/USW Oceanwide Survey Project, an effort to perform comprehensive surveys of strategic ocean areas, during fiscal year 1967. The first of the year was spent in the Atlantic with work in the Labrador Sea followed by a search for the reported American Scout Seamount. The June 1966 survey found no evidence of a seamount with no soundings less than 2,362 fathoms (14,172 ft; 4,320 m) but did find strong returns from the Deep Scattering Layer that could be mistaken for shoals. Following additional surveys in the Gulf of Maine and north of Bermuda the ship was transferred to the Pacific in December 1966. The remainder of the fiscal year was spent surveying north of Hawaii into the Gulf of Alaska.

On 8 August 1968 Silas Bent departed Hakodate, Japan for surveys east of Kamchatka but was diverted on 12 August to an area south of Amchitka Island, Alaska to assist in the search, termed CHASE VI SALVOPS, for the Liberty ship Robert L. Stevenson which was to be scuttled with a load of ammunition but failed to immediately sink and sunk in an unknown position. After six days on station the survey ship located the lost ship using a deep towed magnetometer and narrow beam echosounder with confirmation by photographs using a deep sea camera. After the search the ship returned to Japan for regular survey operations with a limited survey in the Sea of Okhotsk before transit to San Francisco arriving 30 October. On departure from San Francisco to Sasebo, Japan between 15 and 28 March 1968 the ship conducted underway transit data and planted current meter and thermistor array buoys in the Sea of Japan. From 11 April to 14 May the ship conducted joint acoustic operations with the RV F. V. Hunt which was also assigned work for the ASW/USW Surveys Project. The two ships continued operations in the Sea of Japan and Sea of Okhotsk into June 1968.

In 1972, she visited Japan, for the 2nd annual Ocean Development Conference held at Tokyo. During the conference, there were numerous tours and briefings held on Silas Bent describing, for the ocean scientists of the world, her capabilities for measuring bathymetric depth, magnetic intensity, gravity, surface temperature, seismic reflection, sound velocity, ambient light, and salinity. As of mid-September 1974, Silas Bent engaged in special operations in the area of Kodiak, Alaska. The ship conducted surveys for about a month in the Sea of Okhotsk beginning on 25 September 1986.

USNS Silas Bent was transferred under the Security Assistance Program to the Republic of Turkey 29 September 1999 and stricken from the Naval Vessel Register on 28 October 1999.

== Turkish service ==
As TCG Çeșme (A-599) the ship continued work as a hydrographic and oceanographic survey ship and was joined by sister ship USNS Elisha Kent Kane (T-AGS-27) which was renamed Çandarli (A-588).

== Honors and awards ==
Qualified Silas Bent personnel were eligible for the following:

- Navy Battle "E" Ribbon
- National Defense Service Medal

== See also ==
Media related to IMO 7738527 at Wikimedia Commons

- NavSource: USNS Silas Bent (T-AGS-26) Introduction Brochure
- United States Navy
- Oceanography
