= USS Larch =

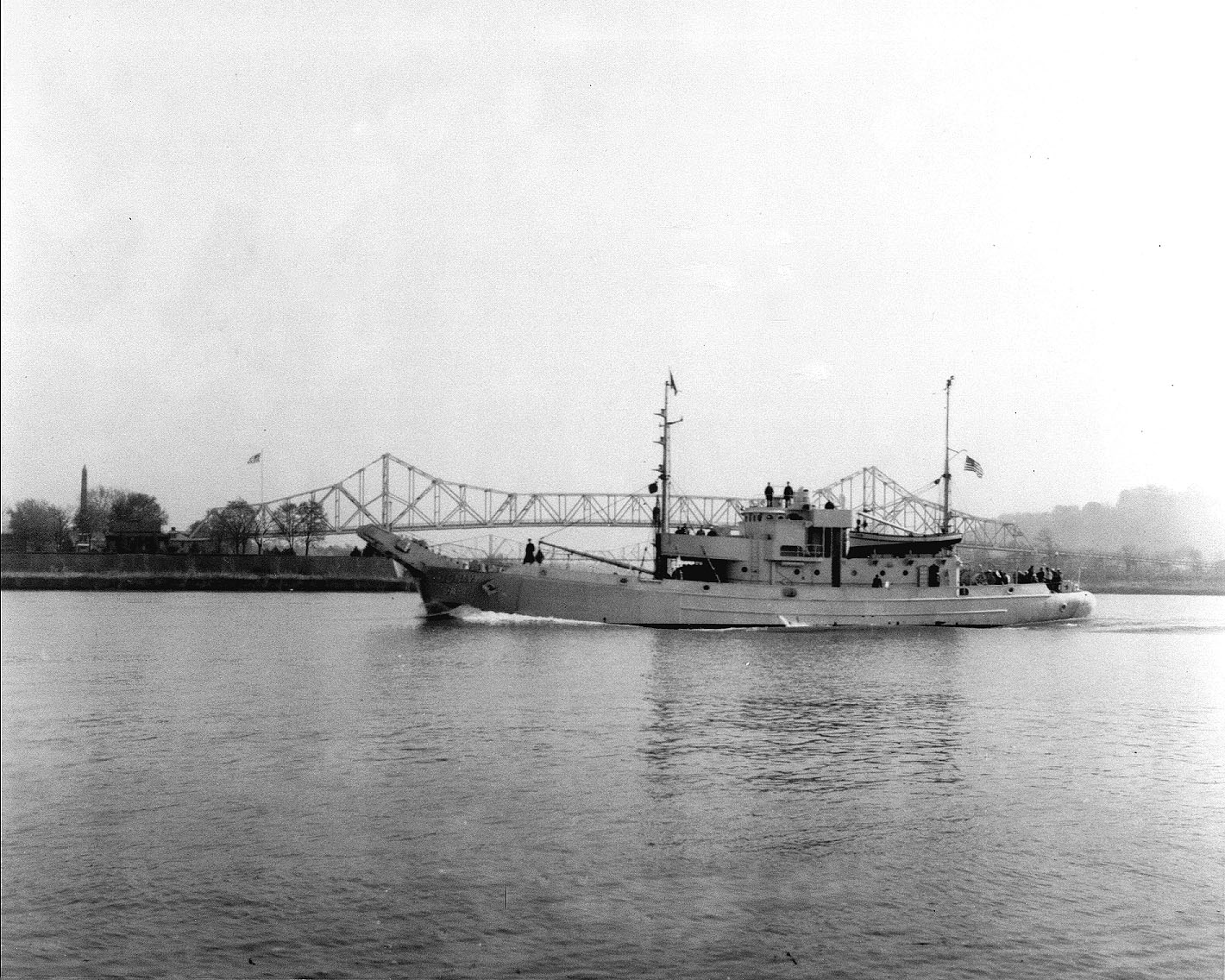
- Larch underway during her pre-commissioning trials in the Kanawha River

History

United States
- Name: USS Larch
- Namesake: Trees of the pine family distinguished by their short fascicled deciduous leaves and tough durable wood
- Builder: Marietta Manufacturing Co., Point Pleasant, West Virginia
- Laid down: 18 October 1940
- Launched: 2 July 1941
- Commissioned: 13 December 1942 as USS Larch (YN-16) at Trinidad
- Decommissioned: 28 June 1946, at Norfolk, Virginia
- In service: 13 December 1941 as Larch (YN-16)
- Reclassified: AN-21, 20 January 1944
- Stricken: 5 March 1947
- Fate: Transferred to the Turkish Navy 10 May 1948

General characteristics
- Type: Aloe-class net laying ship
- Tonnage: 560 tons
- Displacement: 850 tons
- Length: 157 ft 8 in (48.06 m)
- Beam: 30 ft 6 in (9.30 m)
- Draft: 10 ft 6 in (3.20 m)
- Propulsion: not known
- Speed: 14.5 knots
- Complement: 48 officers and enlisted
- Armament: one single 3 in (76 mm) gun mount, two 0.5 in (12.7 mm) machine guns, one y-gun

USS Larch (AN-21/YN-16) was an Aloe-class net laying ship which was assigned to serve the U.S. Navy during World War II with her protective anti-submarine nets.

== Built in West Virginia ==
Larch (YN-16) was laid down 18 October 1940 by Marietta Manufacturing Company, Point Pleasant, West Virginia; launched 2 July 1941; and placed in service 13 December 1941.

== World War II service ==
After shakedown, Larch was assigned to the 3d Naval District and operated on antisubmarine warfare (ASW) patrol out of New York Harbor. Departing New York City 12 April 1942, the net tender arrived Trinidad, 2 weeks later for patrol and net laying operations in the West Indies.

Larch was placed in full commission at Trinidad 13 December 1942 and was reclassified AN-21 on 20 January 1944. Playing a small but vital role, she laid, maintained, and removed anti-torpedo and antisubmarine nets in the West Indies throughout World War II. On 10 January 1945, Larch helped salvage a Pan American Clipper which had crashed in the Gulf of Paria, Venezuela, recovering six bodies and the plane fuselage.

== Post-war decommissioning ==
Departing Trinidad 25 September, Larch steamed toward Norfolk, Virginia, arriving there 12 October. She operated out of Norfolk until she decommissioned there 28 June 1946. She was struck from the Navy List 5 March 1947, and transferred to Turkey under the Military Assistance Program 10 May 1948. She served the Turkish Navy as AG-4 (P-304).
