= USNS Wyman =

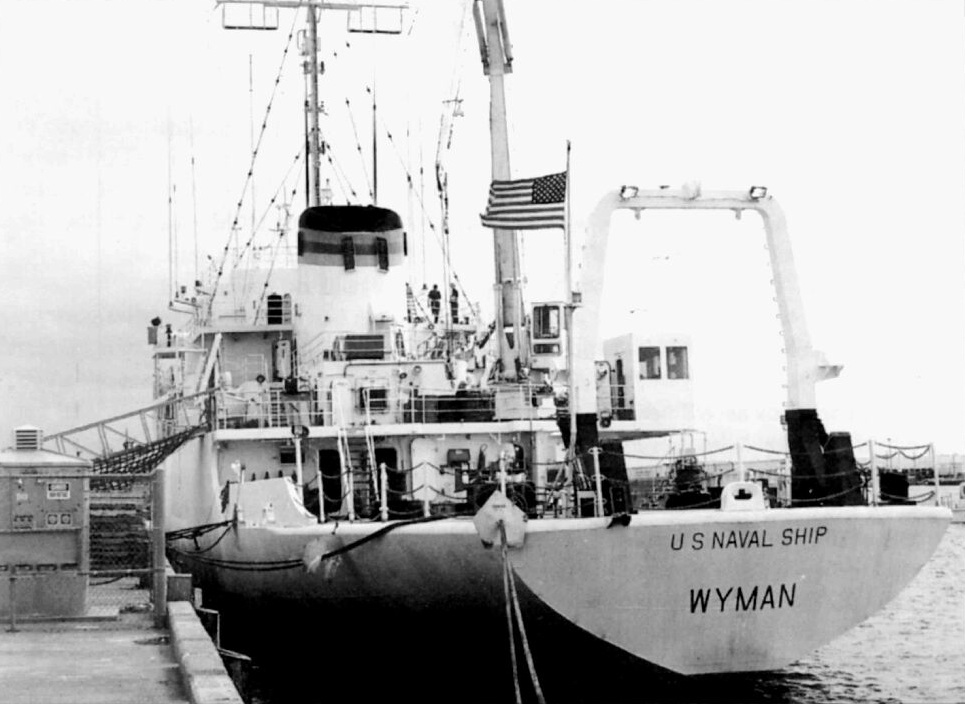
- NAVOCEANO (Naval Oceanographic Office) Bulletin, March 1994 photo of USNS Wyman (T-AGS-34) captioned: "Refurbishments provides ship with extensive shallow-water survey capability"

History

United States
- Name: USNS Wyman
- Namesake: Robert H. Wyman
- Builder: Defoe Shipbuilding Company, Bay City, Michigan
- Laid down: 18 July 1968
- Launched: 30 October 1969
- Acquired: 3 November 1971
- Stricken: 3 May 1999
- Identification: IMO number: 7738632
- Fate: Scrapping completed 1 October 2014

General characteristics
- Class & type: Silas Bent-class hydrographic survey ship
- Displacement: 2,596 long tons (2,638 t) light
- Length: 286 ft 7 in (87.35 m)
- Beam: 48 ft (15 m)
- Draft: 15 ft (4.6 m)
- Propulsion: ALCO diesel engines, General Electric electric drive, 3,000 shp (2,237 kW), single shaft
- Speed: 15.5 knots (28.7 km/h; 17.8 mph)
- Complement: 12 officers, 30 crew, 28 survey party
- Armament: None

USNS Wyman (T-AGS-34) was an oceanographic survey vessel laid down on 18 July 1968 by the Defoe Shipbuilding Company of Bay City, Michigan. Launched on 30 October 1969, sponsored by Mrs. Francis J. Blouin, wife of the Deputy Chief of Naval Operations, Vice Admiral Francis J. Blouin; she was accepted by the Military Sealift Command (MSC) on 19 November 1971 at the Boston Naval Shipyard.

Wyman, designed and built to conduct hydrographic and oceanographic studies and operated by a civilian crew, served with MSC under the technical direction of the Oceanographer of the Navy. In addition to the MSC crew, who operated and maintained the ship, there was a complement of civilian technicians and scientists aboard who were part of Naval Oceanographic Office (NAVOCEANO). Initially assigned to MSC Atlantic, the Wyman made several cruises in the North Atlantic, visiting such ports as Reykjavik, Tromso, Bergen, Rota, Lisbon, and Glasgow during the early 1970s. One of the first women to serve MSC at sea came aboard as the ship's Medical Officer in early 1974. The Wyman was transferred to MSC Pacific on 16 November 1974 for a brief tour of duty that lasted into the summer of 1975. She was returned to MSC Atlantic at Port Canaveral, Florida, on 21 August 1975 and remained active with that fleet into 1979.

The ship's original echo sounding equipment and Hydrographic Data Acquisition System (HDAS) consisted of a very early seagoing data processing system made up of two Digital Equipment Corporation PDP-9 computers that shared a central 'drum' disk drive. KSR-35 TTYs were used as the primary system consoles and a Calcomp flatbed plotter kept a real-time track of the ship's position. This equipment was all replaced in the mid-1970s by a new narrow beam swath system. The swath array, replacing the single beam system, was the Bottom Topography Survey Subsystem (BOTOSS) and the processing system, replacing HDAS, was the Bathymetric Survey System (BASS). The initial BOTOSS hull mounting was subject to air bubble interference so that a new arrangement on a fairing and foil mounted on the keel was required to house the array elements during a 1974-1975 period in a West Coast yard.

Wyman was struck from the Naval Vessel Register on 3 May 1999, and transferred to the Maritime Administration (MARAD), laid up at the National Defense Reserve Fleet (NDRF) at laid up 21 March 2001 at the National Defense Reserve Fleet (NDRF) at Suisun Bay, CA, California. The ship was under contract for scrapping by ESCO Marine, Inc. with scrapping completed 1 October 2014.
