= USS Chiwaukum =

Mettawee-class gasoline tanker

History

United States
- Name: USS Chiwaukum
- Namesake: Chiwaukum River in Washington
- Ordered: as T1-M-A2 tanker hull, MC hull 1523
- Laid down: date unknown
- Launched: 4 May 1944
- Commissioned: 25 July 1944
- Decommissioned: 31 May 1946
- Stricken: date unknown
- Fate: transferred to Turkey, 10 May 1948

General characteristics
- Tonnage: 1,228 long tons deadweight (DWT)
- Displacement: 846 tons(lt) 2,270 tons(fl)
- Length: 220 ft 6 in
- Beam: 37 ft
- Draught: 17 ft
- Propulsion: Diesel direct drive, single screw, 720 hp
- Speed: 10 knots (19 km/h)
- Complement: 62
- Armament: one single 3 in (76 mm) dual purpose gun mount, two 40 mm guns, three single 20 mm gun mounts

USS Chiwaukum (AOG-26) was a Mettawee-class gasoline tanker acquired by the U.S. Navy for the dangerous task of transporting gasoline to warships in the fleet, and to remote Navy stations.

Chiwaukum was launched 4 May 1944 by East Coast Shipyards, Inc., Bayonne, New Jersey, under a Maritime Commission contract; sponsored by Mrs. A. H. Moore; acquired by the Navy and commissioned 25 July 1944.

== World War service ==
Clearing Norfolk, Virginia, 23 September 1944, Chiwaukum sailed to load oil at Aruba, Netherlands West Indies, and reached Espiritu Santo, New Hebrides, 25 November.

She stood out of Espiritu Santo 2 December for the New Guinea area where she operated as a gasoline tanker until 18 January 1945 when she reported for similar duty in the Philippines. Departing Samar, Philippine Islands, 12 December 1945, Chiwaukum arrived at San Francisco, California, 9 February. She remained there until 17 April when she put out for Norfolk, arriving 16 May.

== Post-war decommissioning ==
Chiwaukum was decommissioned 31 May 1946 and transferred to Turkey 10 May 1948 and renamed TCG Akpınar. Final disposition: fate unknown.

== Military awards and honors ==
Chiwaukum’s crew was eligible for the following medals:

- American Campaign Medal
- Asiatic-Pacific Campaign Medal
- World War II Victory Medal
- Philippines Liberation Medal
