= USNS Kane =

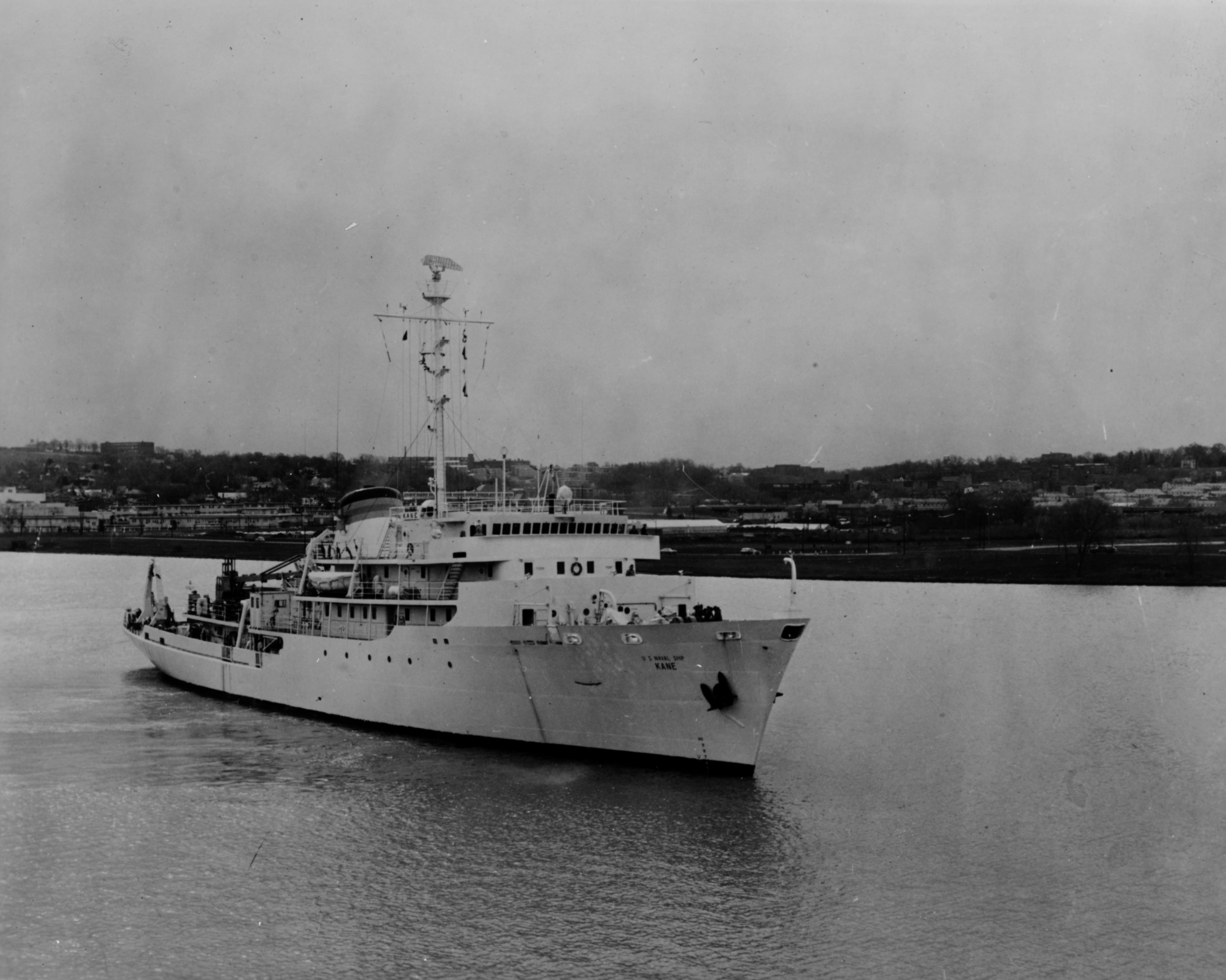
- USNS Kane (T-AGS-27)

History

United States
- Name: Kane
- Namesake: Elisha Kent Kane
- Awarded: 5 February 1964
- Builder: Christy Corporation, Sturgeon Bay, Wisconsin
- Laid down: 19 December 1964
- Launched: 20 November 1965
- Acquired: 19 May 1967
- In service: 26 May 1967
- Stricken: 14 March 2001
- Identification: IMO number: 7738644
- Fate: transferred to the Turkish Navy

Turkey
- Name: TCG Çandarlı
- Namesake: town of Çandarlı
- Commissioned: 25 July 2001
- Status: in active service

General characteristics
- Type: Silas Bent-class survey ship
- Tonnage: 1,935 tons (lt)
- Tons burthen: 2,580 tons (fl)
- Length: 285 feet 3 inches (86.94 m)
- Beam: 48 feet (15 m)
- Draft: 15 feet (4.6 m)
- Installed power: 3,000 SHP
- Propulsion: ALCO diesels, Allis-Chalmers electric drive, single shaft
- Speed: 15 knots (28 km/h)
- Complement: 44 crew, 26 scientific party

USNS Kane (T-AGS-27) was a Silas Bent-class survey ship acquired by the United States Navy and delivered to Military Sealift Command in 1967. Kane spent her career performing oceanographic surveys. The ship was equipped with the Oceanographic Data Acquisition System (ODAS) as were oceanographic survey ships USNS Silas Bent (T-AGS-26) and USNS Wilkes (T-AGS-33).

Kane was launched 20 November 1965 by the Christy Corporation, Sturgeon Bay, Wisconsin; sponsored by Mrs. Harold T. Duetermann, wife of Vice Admiral Deutermann; assigned to Military Sea Transportation Service; and placed in service 26 May 1967 for scientific operations in the Atlantic. Bruce Heezen was the chief scientist on Kane's maiden research voyage, a four-month survey of fracture zones to determine what route and through what periods of geologic time North America separated from Europe and Africa. Cartographer Marie Tharp was also on board and worked on revising the North Atlantic physiographic diagram while also producing a new physiographic map of the Pacific Ocean floor.

Besides conducting coastal hydrographic and oceanographic surveys, Kane also tended small survey craft, helicopters, and Marine Corps survey teams. She was capable of compiling and printing finished charts on the spot to meet fleet and landing force requirements and had accommodations for scientists.

== Decommissioning and fate ==
Kane was deactivated in Malaysia 14 March 2001, and transferred to the Republic of Turkey, renamed TGC Çandarli (A-588), joining her sister ship, ex-Silas Bent which was renamed TCG Çeșme (A-599).
