= Silas Bent-class survey ship =

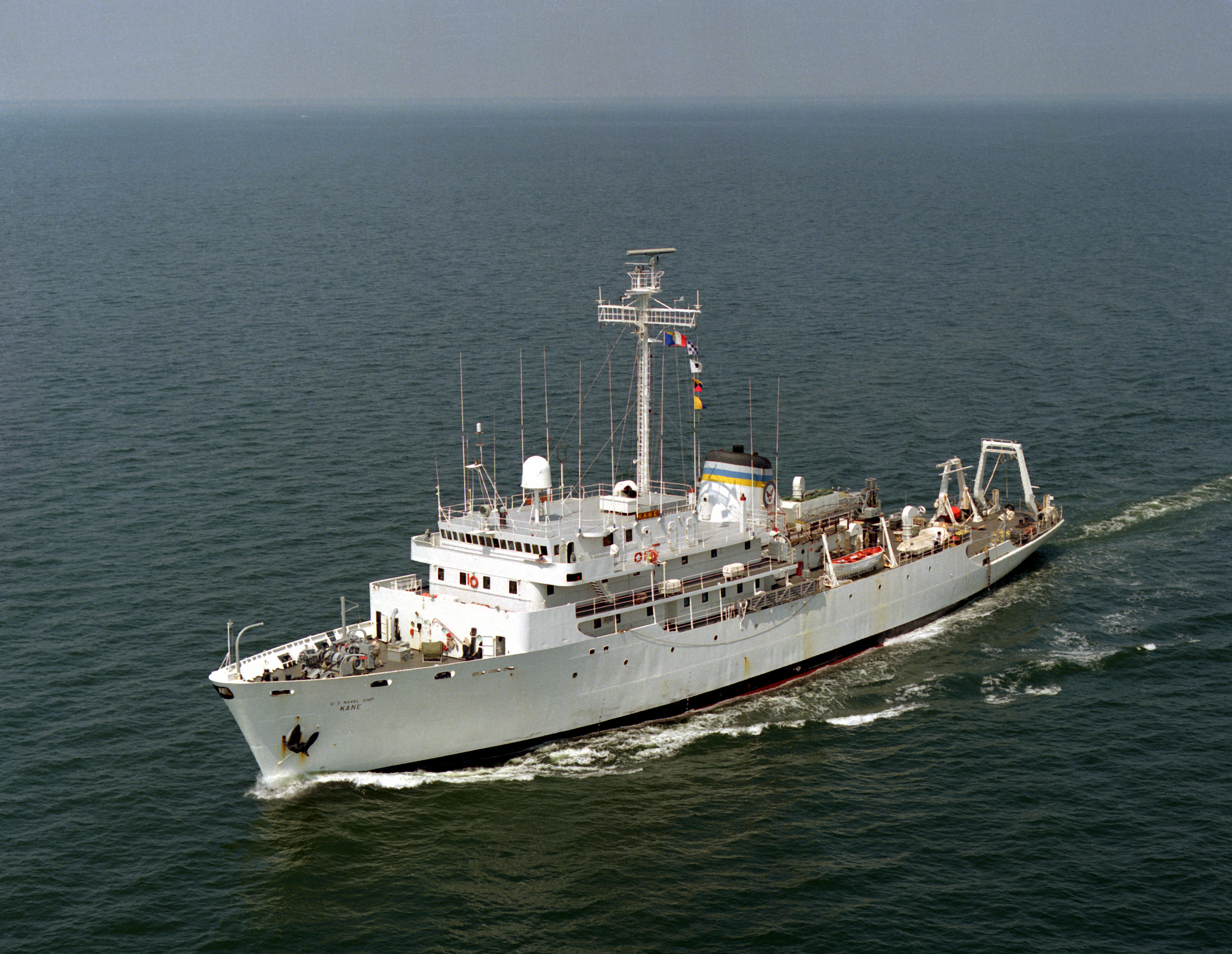
- USNS Elisha Kent Kane (T-AGS-27) underway in 1984

General characteristics
- Type: AGS-26 (Silas Bent) class survey ship
- Tonnage: 1,935 tons
- Displacement: 2,580 tons
- Length: 285 ft 3 in (86.94 m)
- Beam: 48 ft (15 m)
- Draft: 15 ft (4.6 m)
- Propulsion: ALCO diesels, Allis-Chalmers electric drive, single shaft. SHP approx. 3000 + 350 SHP trainable and retractable, gas turbine powered, bow propulsion unit to assist station-keeping and ultra-quiet ship operations.
- Speed: 15 knots
- Complement: 44 crew, 26 scientific party
- Armament: None

The Silas Bent class is frequently found applied to four ships though the Naval Vessel Register and some sources officially break them into the subclasses of AGS-26 and AGS-33. Silas Bent was the first of the first four purpose built ships for U.S. Navy surveys. Previous ships had been modifications of various naval types.

== Bent (AGS-26) and Kane (AGS-27) ==
Two ships were built to essentially the same design at two different yards.

- USNS Silas Bent (T-AGS-26) was laid down at the American Shipbuilding Corp, Cleveland, Ohio, 2 March 1964, launched, 15 May 1964 and delivered to the Navy 23 July 1965.
- USNS Kane (T-AGS-27) was laid down at Christy Corporation, Sturgeon Bay, Wisconsin, 19 December 1964, launched 20 November 1965 and delivered to the Navy, 19 May 1967.

== Wilkes (AGS-33) and Wyman (AGS-34) ==
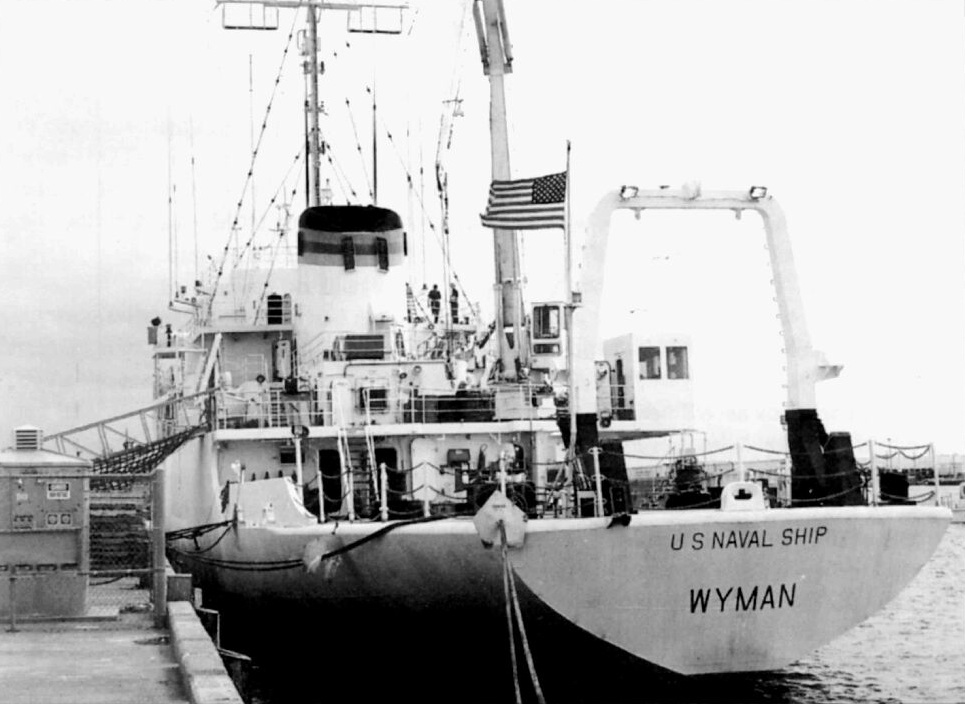
- NAVOCEANO (Naval Oceanographic Office) Bulletin, March 1994 photo of USNS Wyman (T-AGS-34) captioned: "Refurbishments provides ship with extensive shallow-water survey capability"

General characteristics
- Type: AGS-33 Wilkes class survey ship
- Tonnage: 1,935 tons
- Displacement: 2,540 tons
- Length: 286 ft 7 1/2 in (87.363 m)
- Beam: 48 ft (15 m)
- Draft: 17 ft (5.2 m) (including sonar domes)
- Propulsion: ALCO diesels, Allis-Chalmers electric drive, single shaft. SHP approx. 3400 + bow propulsion unit.
- Speed: 15 knots
- Complement: 42 crew, 28 scientific party
- Armament: None

The AGS-26 and AGS-33 (Wilkes) subclass ships were externally almost identical with slightly different modernized internal configuration reflecting their being laid down (July 1968) three years after Bent's delivery to the Navy 23 July 1965 (See photos at references). The two AGS-33 ships are USNS Wilkes (T-AGS-33) and USNS Wyman (T-AGS-34)

USNS Wilkes (AGS-33) and USNS Wyman (AGS-34) were laid down on the same day, 18 July 1968, at the same shipyard, Defoe Shipbuilding Company, Bay City, Michigan.

- USNS Wilkes was launched on 31 July 1969 & delivered to the Navy on 28 June 1971.
- USNS Wyman was launched on 30 October 1969, delivered to the Navy on 3 November 1971, and scrapped by 1 October 2014.

== Configuration and Data Systems ==
The ships were designed to be capable of surveys supporting hydrographic and bathymetric charting and oceanographic requirements. They differed chiefly in installed equipment and systems, particularly data acquisition systems.

The initial Bent installation was a prototype "Shipboard Survey System" based on a standard Navy AN/UYK computer.

Later Bent was equipped with the Oceanographic Data Acquisition System (ODAS), operational 1971, as were the later oceanographic survey ships Kane and Wilkes. The Wyman replaced USNS Sgt. George D Keathley (T-AGS-35) for geophysical, particularly gravity, and bathymetric surveys.

Wyman was equipped first with the Hydrographic Data Acquisition System (HYDAS) that was replaced in the mid-1970s by a new narrow beam swath system with its own specialized data acquisition system. The swath array, replacing the single beam system, was the Bottom Topography Survey Subsystem (BOTOSS) and the processing system, replacing HYDAS, was the Bathymetric Survey System (BASS).

== See also ==
- The Federal Ocean Program, April 1972
- Silas Bent (TAGS 26) Class
- NavSource: USNS Silas Bent (T-AGS-26) Introduction Brochure
- Photo gallery of Silas Bent-class survey ship at NavSource Naval History
- Silas Bent (TAGS 26) Class
