= Underwater Offence =

Special operations Forces of the Turkish Navy

Underwater Offence Group Command
- Su Altı Taarruz Grup Komutanlığı (SAT)
- Active: 1963–present
- Country: Turkey
- Allegiance: Turkish Armed Forces
- Branch: Turkish Navy
- Type: Special Forces
- Mottos: "Any time, any place!"; "I fight where I am commanded, I win where I fight"; "The only easy day was yesterday"
- Engagements: Turkish invasion of Cyprus; Lucky-S Drug Operation; Battle of Mogadishu; MV Avrasya Hostage Rescue Operation; Kardak Crisis; Kartepe Seabus Hostage Rescue Operation; Operation Euphrates shield; Operation Olive Branch

Insignia
- Abbreviation: SAT

The Underwater Offence (Turkish: Su Altı Taaruz), abbreviated SAT, is the special operations force of the Turkish Naval Forces. They are affiliated with the Naval Operation Directorate. During wartime, these units are responsible for carrying out stealthy attacks, sabotage, and raids on enemy strategic facilities including those located under water, over water, on land, or in the air. They also target floating platforms. The SAT participates in coastal reconnaissance tasked with obtaining information on coastal areas before deploying forces and maintaining control over foreign ports and underwater areas.

== History ==
The first SAT course was conducted on 1962 in the city of Iskenderun, with its first trainees graduating in 1963. The original name of the SAT unit was Su Altı Komando (S.A.K.) ("Underwater Commando") and was bound to the Kurtarma ve Sualtı Komutanlığı (K.S.K.), or Rescue and Underwater Command.

In 1974 the SAT group command became bound to the Turkish Navy's General Command, and participated in the Turkish invasion of Cyprus later that year. They conducted the beach reconnaissance missions prior to the amphibious landing of the Turkish Armed Forces at Pentamili beach near Kyrnia (20 July 1974). Other publicised operations of SAT commandos are as follows:

- SAT commandos took part in the Imia crisis in 1996.
- In 2012, the SAT participated in Operation Ocean Shield, organized by NATO against piracy and rescued 7 Yemeni seafarers.

== Mission ==
The SAT's main tasks are:

- Surveillance on enemy structures, facilities, defense systems or strategically relevant buildings.
- Covert sabotage against naval units and/or enemy structures.
- Covert landing and infiltration.
- Reconnaissance on behind-the-beaches being considered for amphibious landing operations.
- Determining secure landing paths.
- Direct action during first wave of landing missions.
- Counter-terrorism missions.
- Close quarters combat.

== Training ==
To specialize in SAT, individuals must successfully complete the 50-week SAT (Marine Commando) course. The first phase of the course is eight weeks dedicated to physical and fitness development. Trainees who pass the rigorous physical and sea exams move on to the underwater phase, which lasts eight weeks. During this phase, they undergo frog-man training. After these phases are successfully completed, the land phase begins. In the land phase, it is called "hell week" after training on gaining a high level of land condition, swimming long distances in the water and getting on the boat, practicing VBSS, performing the task under pressure, getting rid of captivity, sea threats, long distance in the land, and finding targets. After intensive training, the land phase is completed. With these trainings, SAT specialists have the skills to sneak, sabotage and raid the enemy's coastal and floating targets. Then, the training mostly consists of tactical floating platforms and aircraft. SAT trainees will train for about 15 hours a day.

== Equipment ==
Underwater Offence Command specialists' equipment includes:

Handguns

- SIG P226
- Glock

Submachine Guns

- CZ Scorpion Evo 3
- H&K MP5A3

Assault Rifles

- M4A1 carbine

Machine Guns

- FN Minimi
- M60
- M134

Sniper Rifles

- Barrett M82A1
- Barrett M95
- Remington XM2010
- CheyTac Intervention
- McMillan TAC-50

Rockets & Explosives

- PSRL-1
- RPG-7
- M72 LAW
- M203 grenade launcher

== Gallery ==
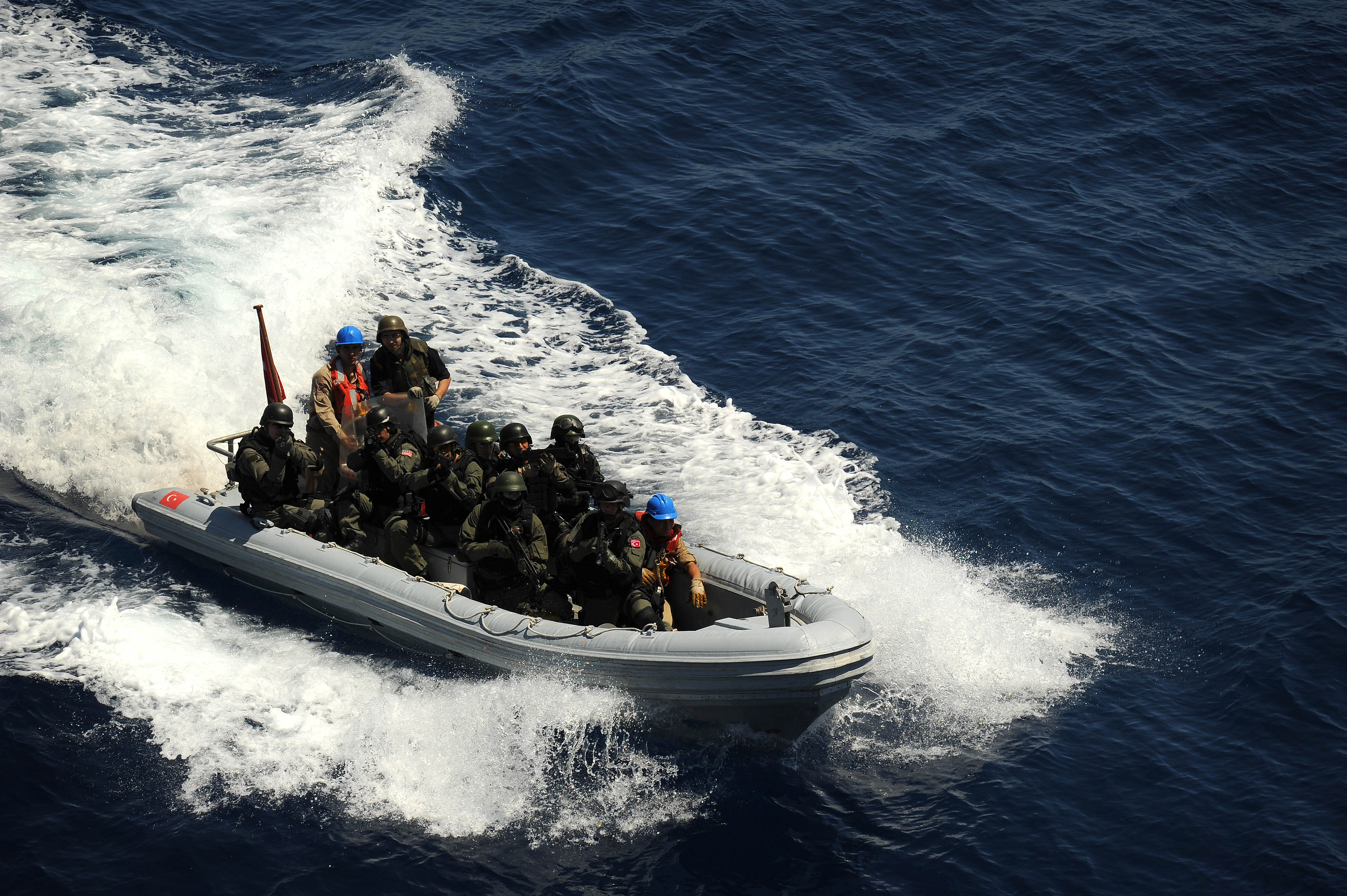
A rigid-hull inflatable boat operated by the SAT unit transfers members of a visit, board, search and seizure team to the Military Sealift Command maritime prepositioning and force container roll-on roll-off and tanker USNS LCPL Roy H. Wheat (T-AK 3016) during the at sea portion of exercise Phoenix Express (PE 10).

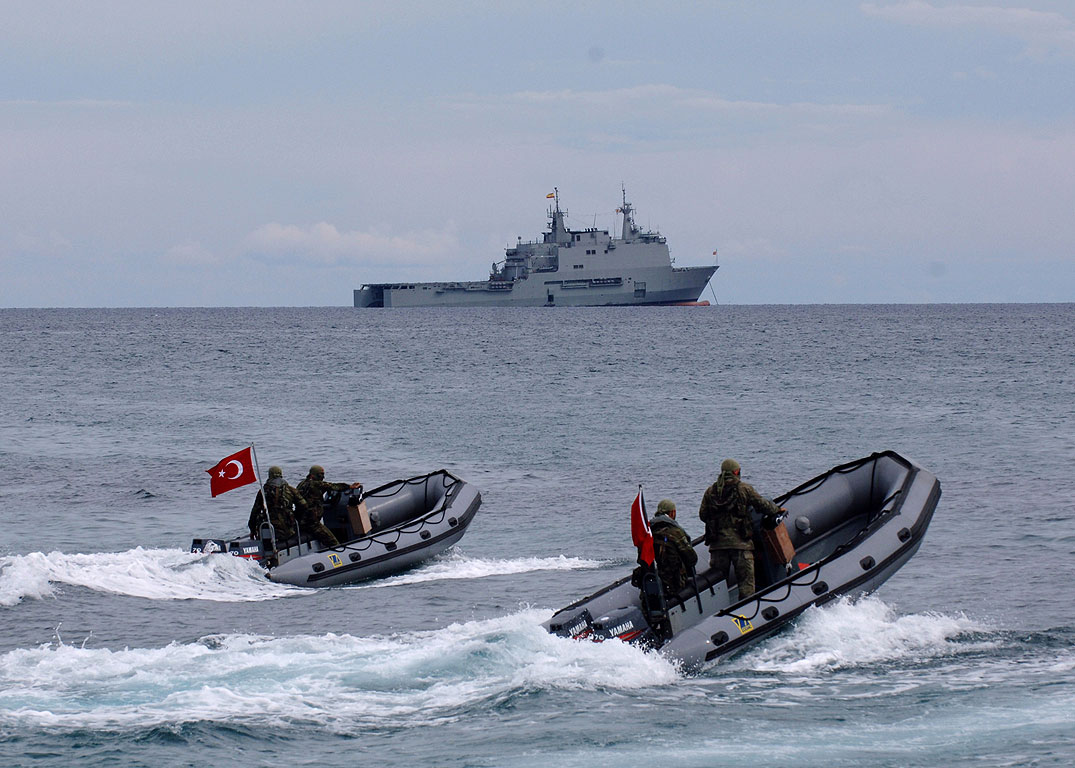
Turkish marines on F470 zodiac boats and Spanish landing platform dock Castilla (L-52) during Destined Glory 2005 (Loyal Midas) military exercise, October 7, 2005.

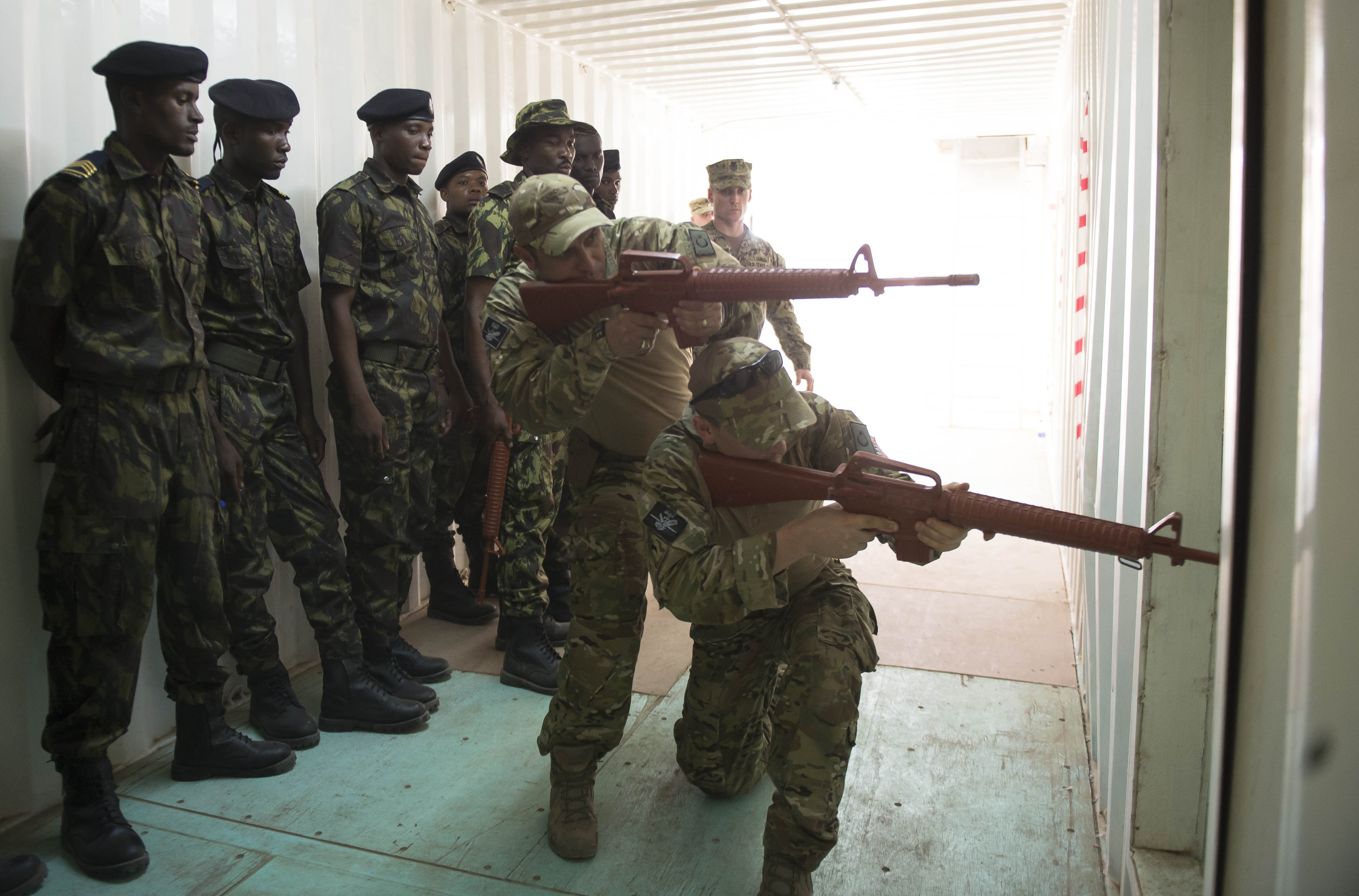
Djibouti (Feb. 2, 2017) - Turkish Navy SAT members demonstrate tactical movements to Mozambique Marines during exercise Cutlass Express 2017. Exercise Cutlass Express 2017, sponsored by U.S. Africa Command and conducted by U.S. Naval Forces Africa, is designed to assess and improve combined maritime law enforcement capacity and promote national and regional security in East Africa.

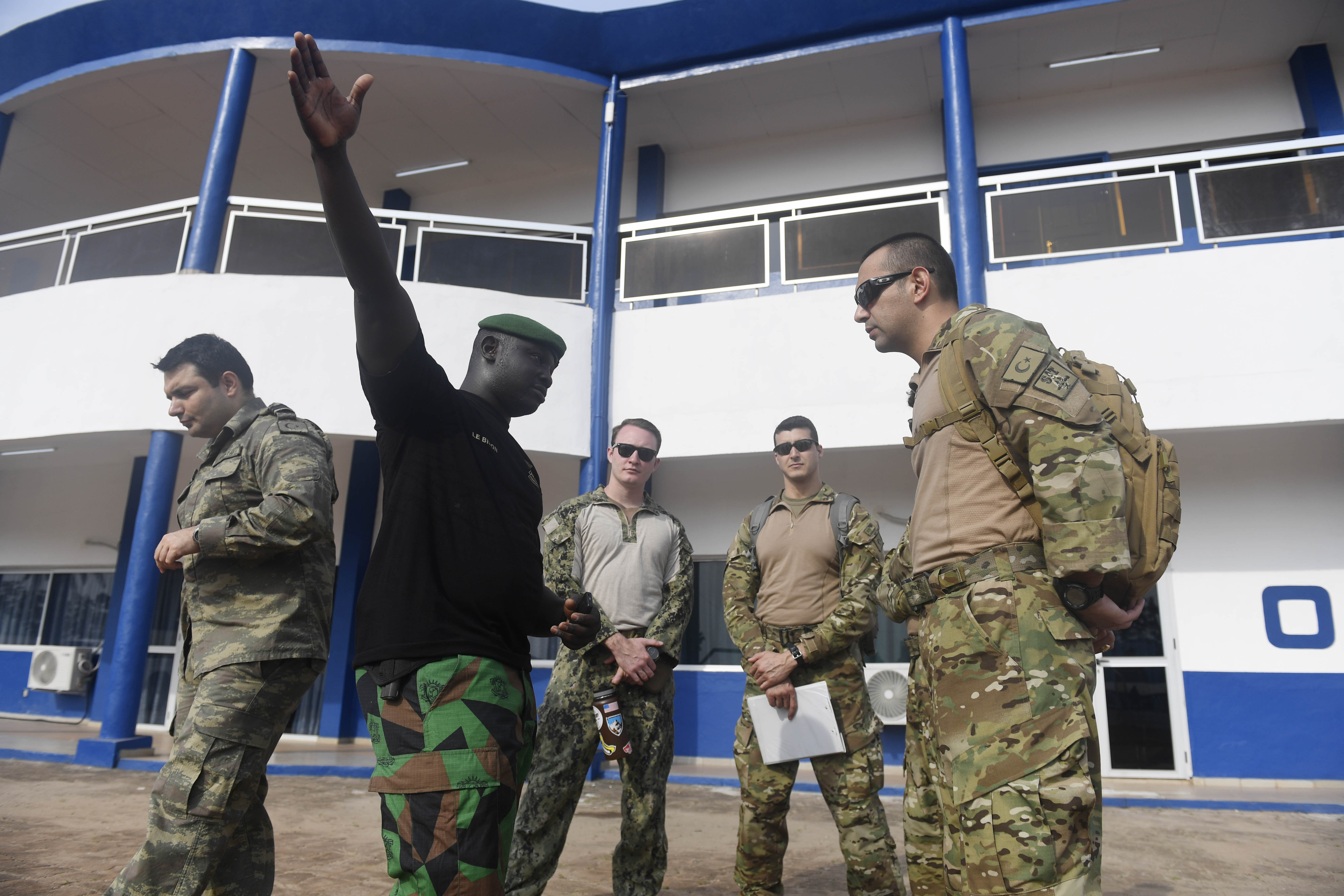
ABIJAN, Cote d'Ivoire An Ivorian Sailor gives directions to Turkish Navy SAT assigned to the Maritime Security Centre of Excellence Mobile Training Team at the initial training meeting at the Ivorian Naval Base March 20, 2017.
