= TCG İnebolu =

TCG İnebolu is the name of the following ships of the Turkish Navy:

- TCG İnebolu (A 575), ex-Bodensee, a tanker acquired from Germany
- TCG İnebolu (A 590), ex-USNS Powhatan, lead Powhatan-class tugboat acquired in 2008

== See also ==
- İnebolu
