= USNS Narragansett =

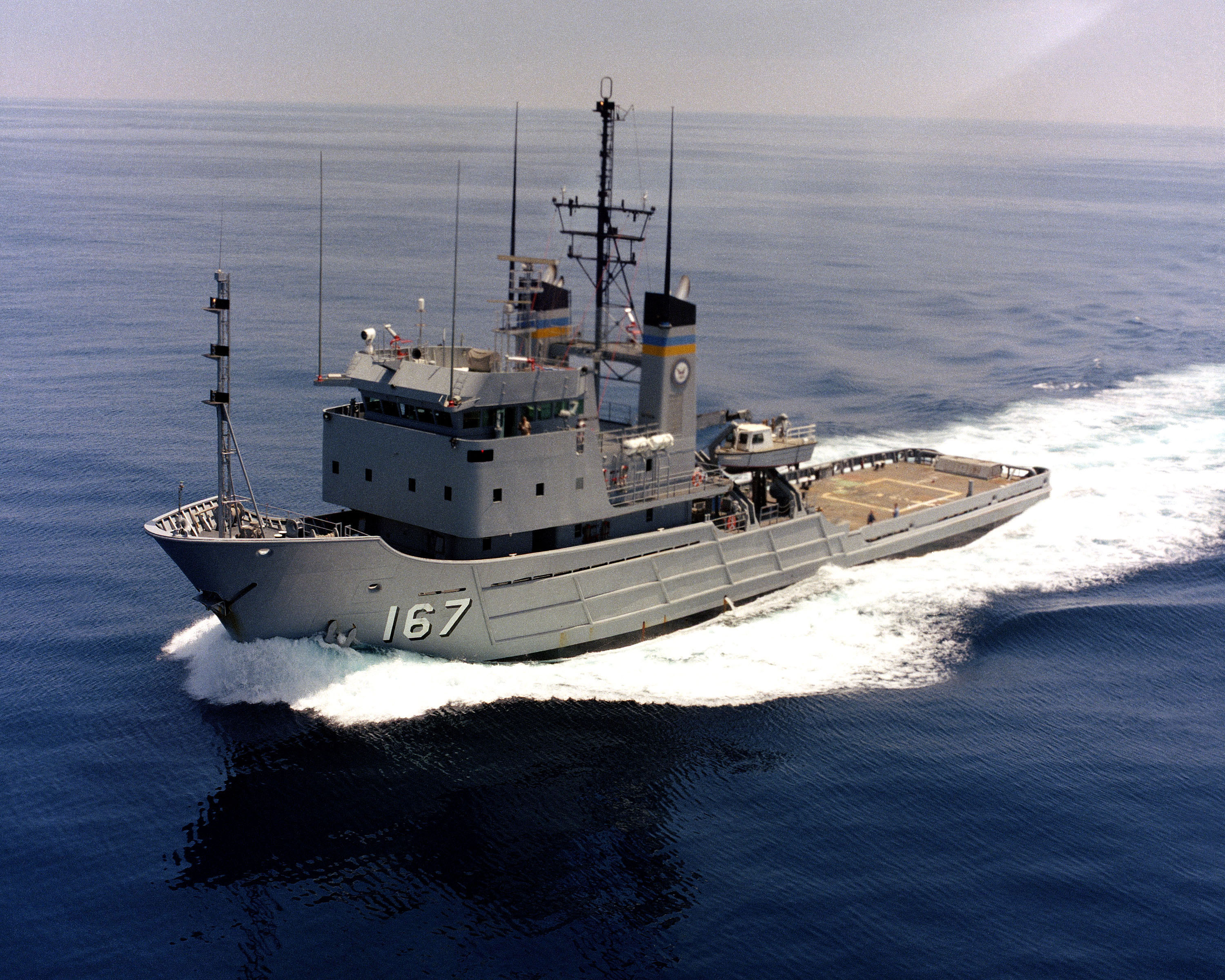
- USS Narragansett (T-ATF 167) underway

History

United States
- Name: USS Narragansett (T-ATF-167)
- Namesake: The Native American Narragansett tribe
- Builder: Marinette Marine, Marinette, Wisconsin
- Laid down: 5 May 1977
- Launched: 12 May 1979
- Acquired: 9 November 1979
- Out of service: 18 October 1999
- Stricken: 5 June 2002
- Identification: IMO number: 8834902; MMSI number: 367214000; Callsign: WDB2452
- Fate: in service as a training vessel

General characteristics
- Class & type: Powhatan-class tugboat
- Displacement: 2,260 long tons (2,296 t) fully loaded
- Length: 226 ft (69 m)
- Beam: 42 ft (13 m)
- Draft: 15 ft (4.6 m)
- Propulsion: 2 × GM EMD 20-645F7B diesels (5.73 MW sustained), two shafts, bow thruster, 300 hp (224 kW)
- Speed: 15 knots (28 km/h; 17 mph)
- Complement: 16 civilians, 4 navy (communications unit)

USS Narragansett (T-ATF-167) is a Powhatan-class fleet ocean tugboat of the US Navy. She was launched in 1979 and inactivated in 1999, but has since been employed in a number of roles. She is still in service as of 2023 as a training support vessel for Carrier Strike Group 4.

== Construction and characteristics ==
The ship was laid down on 5 May 1977 by the Marinette Marine Corp. of Marinette, Wisconsin. Narragansett was launched on 12 May 1979, and delivered to the Navy on 9 November 1979.

Her hull was built of welded steel plates. She is 225 feet 11 inches (68.86 m) long at the waterline and 240 feet 1 inch (73.18 m) overall, with a beam of 42 feet (13 m), and a draft of 15 feet (4.6 m). She displaces 2,260 tons fully loaded.

As originally built, Narragansett had two controllable-pitch Kort-nozzle propellers for propulsion. She had two 20-cylinder Diesel engines, GM EMD 20-645F7B, which provided 4,500 shaft horsepower. These would drive the ships at 15 knots. She also had a 300-horsepower bow thruster to improve maneuverability.

Electrical power aboard the ship was provided by three 400 Kw generators. These were powered by three Detroit Diesel 8v-71 engines.

Powhatan-class tugs had global range in order to support the U.S. fleet across oceans. Narragansett's tankage was consequently large. She can carry 206,714 U.S. gallons (782,500 L) of Diesel oil, 6,100 U.S. gallons (23,000 L) of lube oil, and 6,000 U.S. gallons (23,000 L) of drinking water. Her unrefueled range at 13 knots was 10,000 miles (16,000 km)

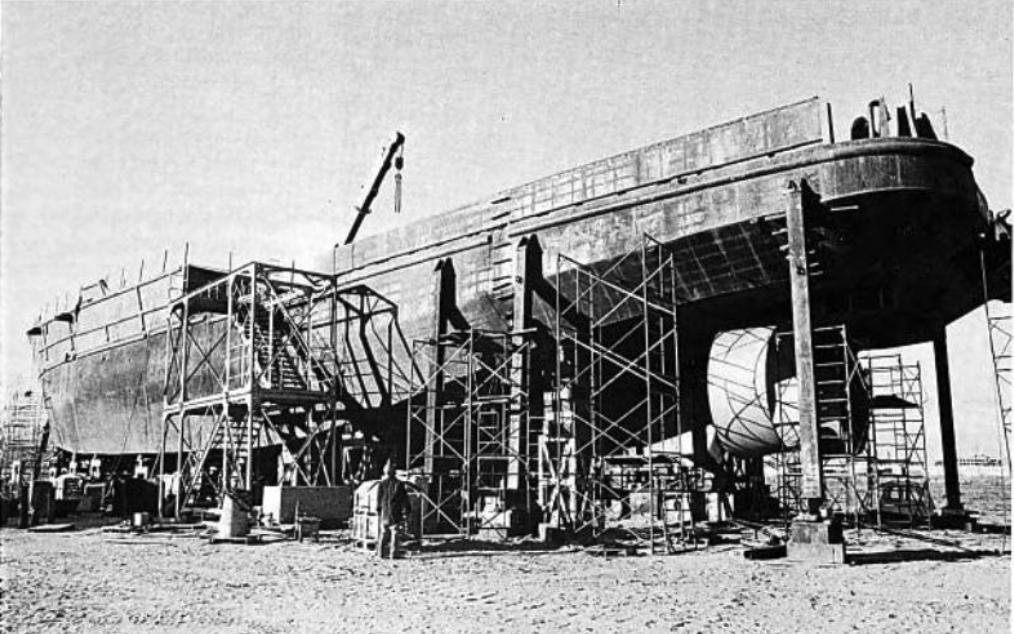
Narragansett under construction in 1978

Narragansett's aft deck is largely open to accommodate a number of different roles. It offers 4,000 square feet (370 m^{2}) of working space. One of the missions of a fleet tug was to tow damaged warships back to port. She is equipped with a SMATCO 66 DTS-200 towing winch for service as a towboat. The towing system can accommodate either wire rope or synthetic-fiber hawsers and produce as much as 90 short tons of bollard pull. She has a 10-ton capacity crane for moving loads on the aft deck. There were connections to bolt down shipping containers and other equipment.

Like all MSC ships, Narragansett was crewed by civilian mariners. At launch, her complement was 16 civilian crew and a 4-person military detachment of communications specialists. The ships could accommodate an additional 16 people aboard for transient, mission-specific roles.

All the ships of the Powhatan-class were named after Native American tribes. Narragansett was named after the Narragansett people, which had their historical center in the Rhode Island area.

== Military Sealift Command service (1979–1999) ==
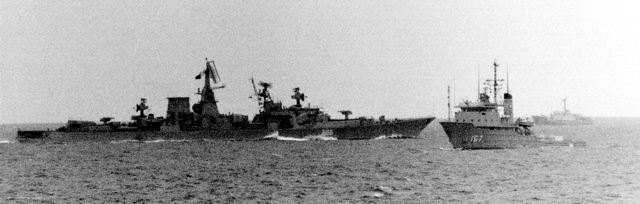
Narragansett was harassed by Soviet ships, including this guided missile cruiser, while searching for the wreckage of Korean Airlines Flight 007.

Narragansett was dispatched from Pusan, South Korea to assist in the search for the black box flight recorders of the downed Korean Air Lines Flight 007 in the Fall of 1983. Special electronic equipment was embarked to listen for the beacon signals produced by the flight recorders, as well as a deep-diving remotely controlled submersible. The tug was harassed by Soviet ships while executing her search patterns and was ultimately unsuccessful in recovering the flight recorders.

In April 1984 the ship assisted in refloating USS Barbour County which was beached at the Silver Strand Amphibious Boat Area in Coronado, California.

Narragansett towed the Ocean Construction Platform Seacon from Panama to San Diego in July 1984.

Narragansett rescued a family of six who had been drifting helplessly in a small sailboat for 32 days near Hawaii in October 1988.

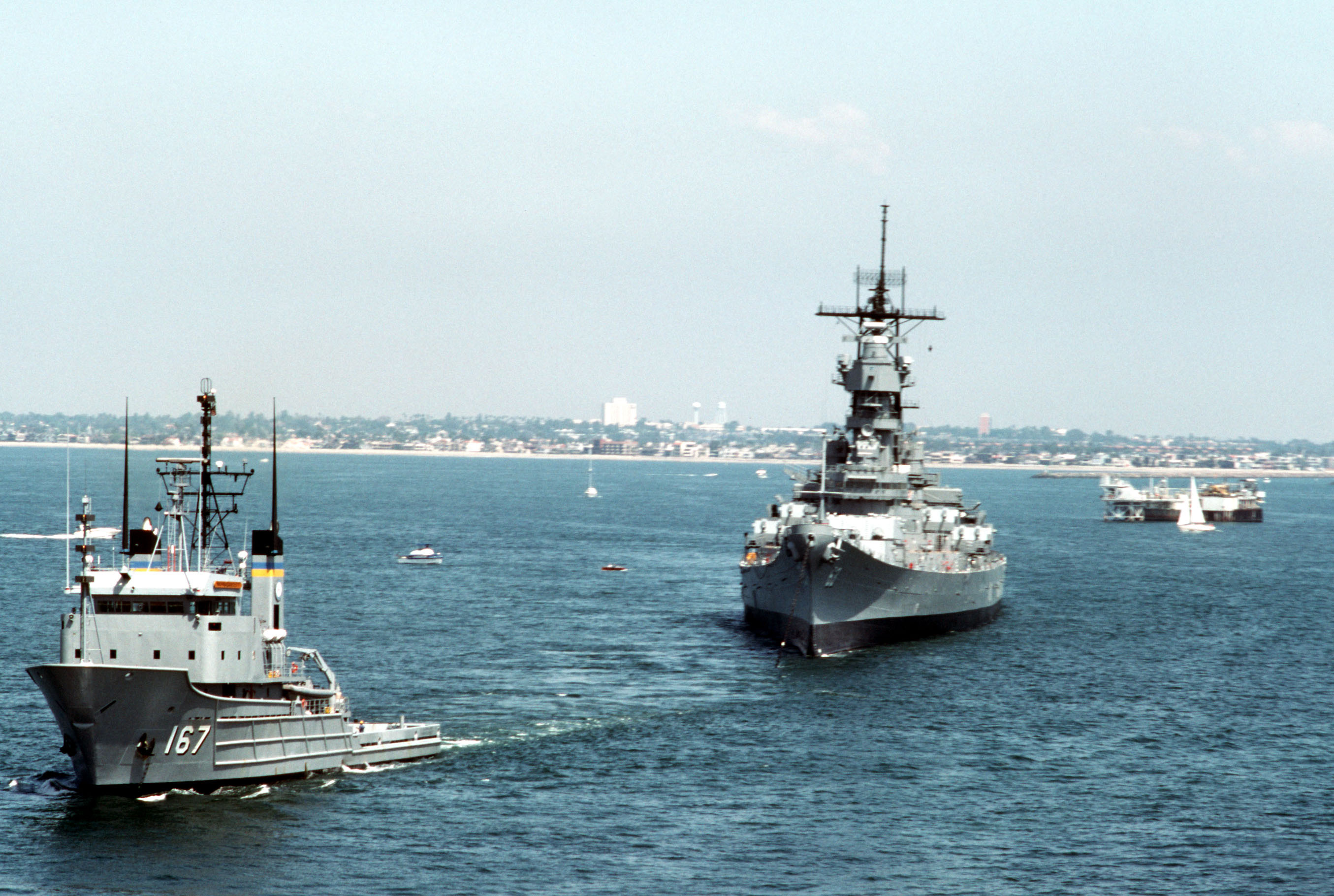
Narragansett tows ex-Missouri out of Long Beach Harbor in 1992

In 1990 she assisted in the investigation of another aircraft incident. Nine people were killed when the cargo door of United Airlines Flight 811 blew off shortly after the plane took off from Hawaii. The door fell into the sea and a search was initiated to find this important piece of evidence. Narragansett laid out a grid of eight transponders on the sea bed which were used to chart the movements of a Navy submersible hunting for the door. Narragansett also searched the area with an Orion side-scan sonar system which was embarked for this mission.

The ship accompanied USNS Navajo as she towed ex-New Jersey from Long Beach to the Naval Inactive Ship Maintenance Facility in Bremerton, Washington in April 1991. In 1992, Narragansett towed ex-Midway from San Diego, and ex-Missouri from Long Beach to Bremerton, Washington.

The ship was placed out of service on 18 October 1999, and assigned to the inactive reserve. She was struck from the Naval Vessel Register on 5 June 2002, and technically became the property of the U.S. Maritime Administration. Narragansett was loaned by her new owner back to the Navy on 2 August 2002.

== Naval Air Weapons Command service (2002–2015) ==
The Naval Air Weapons Command leased Narragansett to CSC Corporation, which in turn, subleased the vessel to Donjon Marine Company, Incorporated. Donjon Marine was also the lessee of a sister ship, Powhatan. The company was responsible for crewing, maintenance, and operations of the ship. Narragansett was used to tow ex-Tripoli to various points in the Pacific where she launched missiles as part of the development and testing programs for the THAAD ballistic missile defense program, the Navy's sea-based terminal missile defense program, and the Israeli Arrow missile program. During this period, Narragansett and ex-Tripoli were based at Pearl Harbor, Mare Island, and finally Pier 80, San Francisco.

In March 2015, Narragansett towed ex-Tripoli through the Panama Canal to be stored with the Beaumont Reserve Fleet.

Since she now operates under the US Navy, she now uses the prefix USS vice USNS.

== Carrier Strike Group 4 service (2016–present) ==
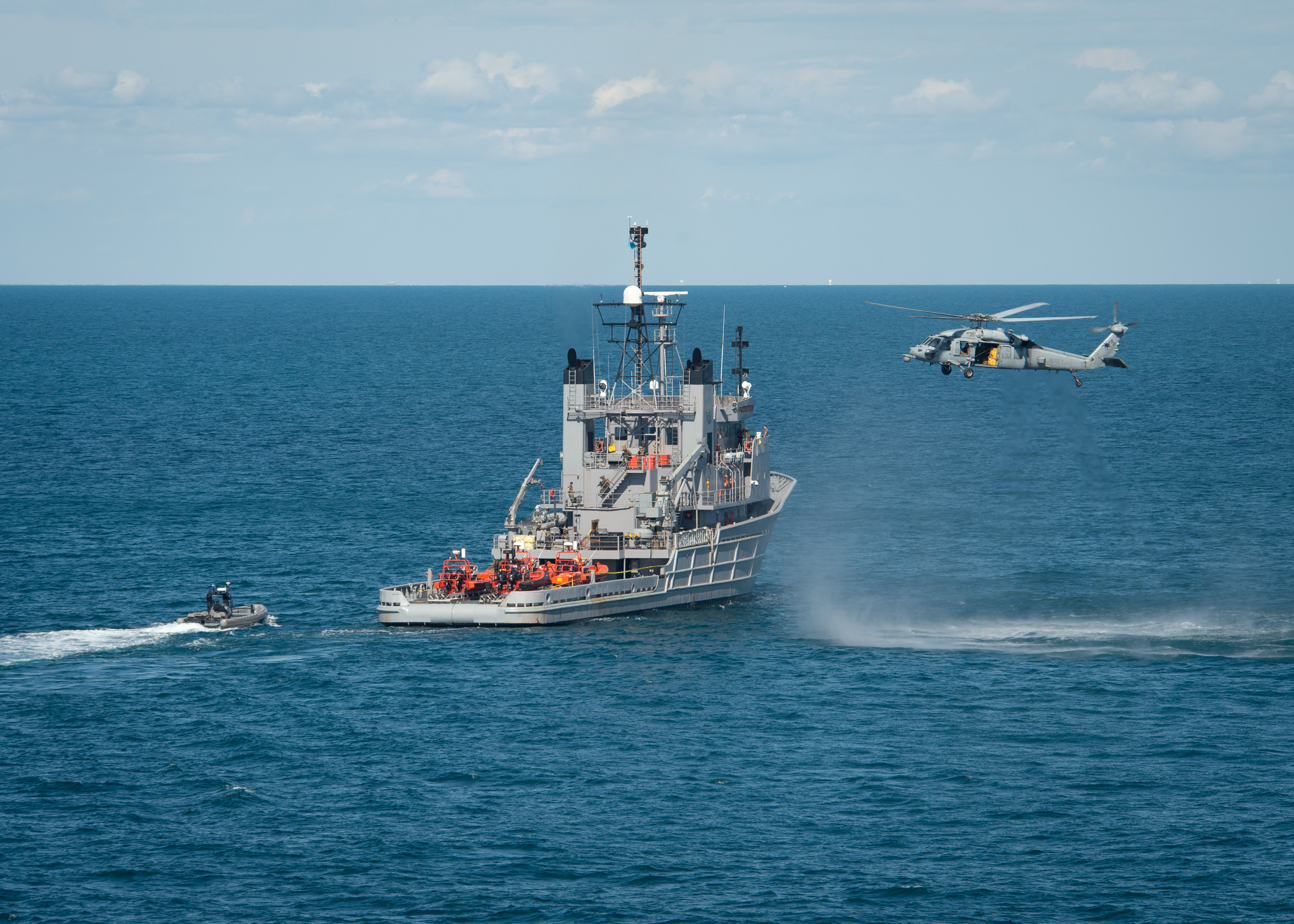
TSV-4 Narragansett during a training exercise in 2019

By 2016, Narragansett had been assigned to the training support vessel squadron of Carrier Strike Group 4 and is now based at JEB Little Creek. Her role is to provide realistic training scenarios for Navy and Marine units about to deploy.

Narragansett was reclassified from a fleet ocean tug (ATF) to a boat in 2009. While she retained her name, her hull number was changed from T-ATF-167 to 226NS7901. Boats do not typically display their hull numbers on their bows. Narragansett displays "TSV-4" on her bow today, a locally assigned pennant number.

Civilian mariners have continued to crew the ship, and private contractors have continued to operate and maintain her. PAE Applied Technologies, LLC was the first, while two other contractors ran the other ships in the training support vessel squadron. On 9 March 2018 Great Eastern Group, Inc. was awarded a contract to crew, maintain, and operate all the ships of the training support vessel squadron. On 12 April 2021 Great Eastern Group was awarded a new five-year contract for all the ships in the squadron, including Narragansett.

Narragansett underwent $7.6 million of maintenance in a Norfolk, Virginia shipyard in 2017. In June 2022, Lyon Shipyard in Norfolk, Virginia won a $13.5 million contract for maintenance. The work was expected to be complete by April 2023.

== Honors and awards ==
Narragansett and her crew earned a number of honors and awards during her service. These include:

Armed Forces Expeditionary Medal in 1994 for her service in Operation Restore Hope in Somalia

Navy Expeditionary Medal in 1980, and 1981 for service in the Iran/Indian Ocean area

Navy "E" Ribbon in 1983, 1984, and 1987

Meritorious Unit Commendation in 1983, for her service searching for the wreckage of Korean Airlines Flight 007.
