= USS Barbour County =

Newport-class tank landing ship

Coordinates: 22°57′20″N 160°05′01.5″W

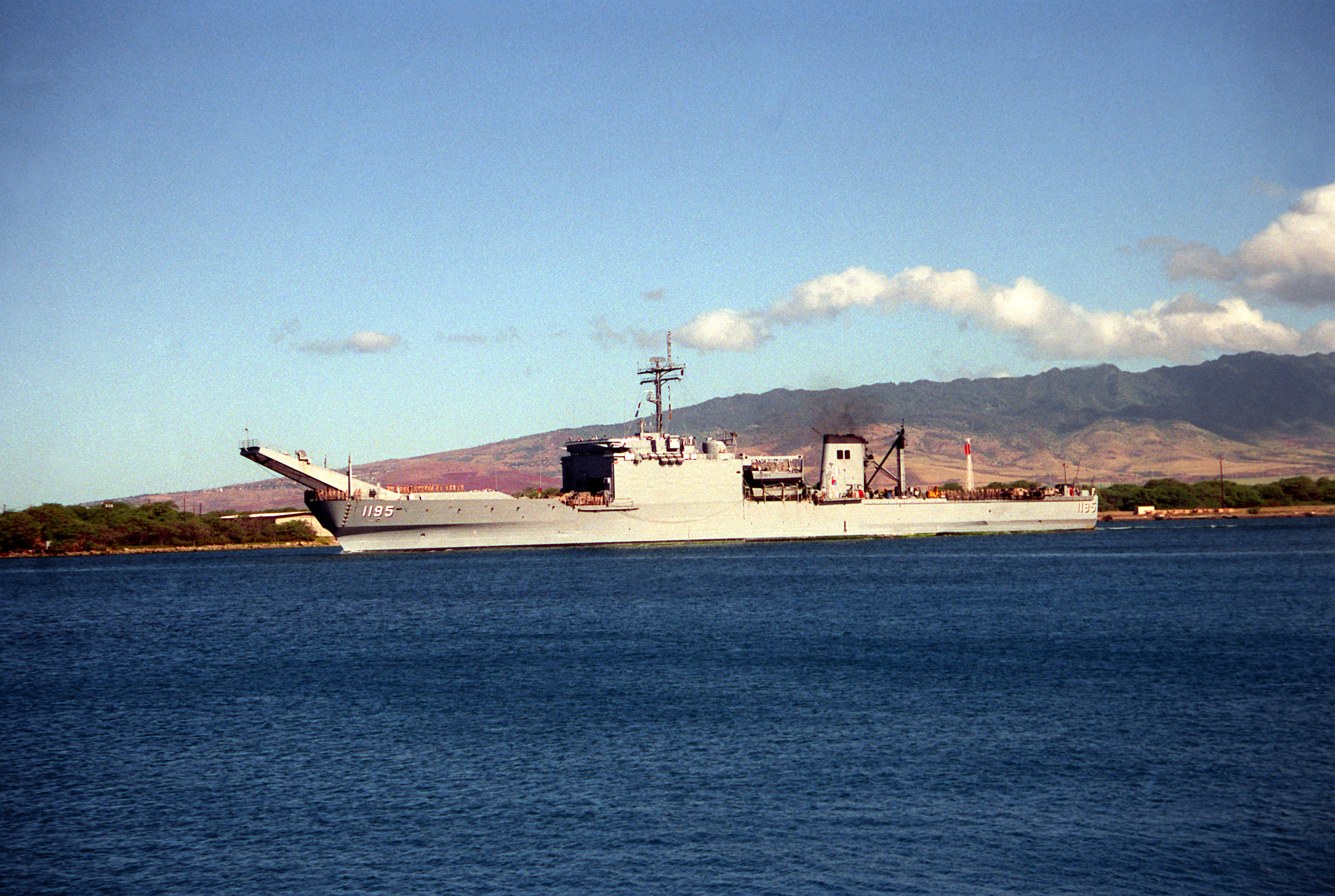
- USS Barbour County on 1 June 1991

History

United States
- Name: USS Barbour County
- Namesake: Barbour County, Alabama; Barbour County, West Virginia
- Builder: National Steel and Shipbuilding Company, San Diego, California
- Laid down: 7 November 1970
- Launched: 15 May 1971
- Commissioned: 12 February 1972
- Decommissioned: 30 March 1992
- Stricken: 31 July 2001
- Fate: Sunk as a target ship, 6 April 2004

General characteristics as built
- Class & type: Newport-class tank landing ship
- Displacement: 4,793 long tons (4,870 t) light; 8,342 long tons (8,476 t) full load
- Length: 522 ft 4 in (159.2 m) oa; 562 ft (171.3 m) over derrick arms
- Beam: 69 ft 6 in (21.2 m)
- Draft: 17 ft 6 in (5.3 m) max
- Propulsion: 2 shafts; 6 Alco diesel engines (3 per shaft); 16,500 shp (12,300 kW); Bow thruster
- Speed: 22 knots (41 km/h; 25 mph) max
- Range: 2,500 nmi (4,600 km; 2,900 mi) at 14 knots (26 km/h; 16 mph)
- Troops: 431 max
- Complement: 213
- Sensors & processing systems: 2 × Mk 63 GCFS; SPS-10 radar
- Armament: 2 × twin 3"/50 caliber guns
- Aviation facilities: Helicopter deck

USS Barbour County (LST-1195) was the seventeenth ship of the twenty Newport-class tank landing ships of the United States Navy (USN) which replaced the traditional bow door-design tank landing ships (LSTs). The vessel was named after two counties; one in Alabama, and the other in West Virginia. The LST was constructed by National Steel and Shipbuilding Company of San Diego, California. Barbour County was launched in 1971 and commissioned into the USN in 1972. Barbour County took part in the Vietnam War, including the evacuation of Saigon and the Gulf War. The LST also performed disaster relief in Bangladesh. The vessel was decommissioned in 1992 and laid up with plans to sell the ship. This did not happen and the vessel was struck from the Naval Vessel Register in 2001 and sunk as a target ship in 2004.

== Design and description ==
Barbour County was a Newport-class tank landing ship which were designed to meet the goal put forward by the United States amphibious forces to have a tank landing ship (LST) capable of over 20 knots (37 km/h; 23 mph). However, the traditional bow door form for LSTs would not be capable. Therefore, the designers of the Newport class came up with a design of a traditional ship hull with a 112-foot (34 m) aluminum ramp slung over the bow supported by two derrick arms. The 34-long-ton (35 t) ramp was capable of sustaining loads up to 75 long tons (76 t). This made the Newport class the first to depart from the standard LST design that had been developed in early World War II.

The LST had a displacement of 4,793 long tons (4,870 t) when light and 8,342 long tons (8,476 t) at full load. Barbour County was 522 feet 4 inches (159.2 m) long overall and 562 ft (171.3 m) over the derrick arms which protruded past the bow. The vessel had a beam of 69 ft 6 in (21.2 m), a draft forward of 11 ft 5 in (3.5 m) and 17 ft 5 in (5.3 m) at the stern at full load.

Barbour County was fitted with six Alco 16-645-ES diesel engines turning two shafts, three to each shaft. The system was rated at 16,500 brake horsepower (12,300 kW) and gave the ship a maximum speed of 22 knots (41 km/h; 25 mph) for short periods and could only sustain 20 knots (37 km/h; 23 mph) for an extended length of time. The LST carried 1,750 long tons (1,780 t) of diesel fuel for a range of 2,500 nautical miles (4,600 km; 2,900 mi) at the cruising speed of 14 knots (26 km/h; 16 mph). The ship was also equipped with a bow thruster to allow for better maneuvering near causeways and to hold position while offshore during the unloading of amphibious vehicles.

The Newport class were larger and faster than previous LSTs and were able to transport tanks, heavy vehicles and engineer groups and supplies that were too large for helicopters or smaller landing craft to carry. The LSTs have a ramp forward of the superstructure that connects the lower tank deck with the main deck and a passage large enough to allow access to the parking area amidships. The vessels are also equipped with a stern gate to allow the unloading of amphibious vehicles directly into the water or to unload onto a utility landing craft (LCU) or pier. At either end of the tank deck there is a 30 ft (9.1 m) turntable that permits vehicles to turn around without having to reverse. The Newport class has the capacity for 500 long tons (510 t) of vehicles, 19,000 ft^{2} (1,800 m^{2}) of cargo area and could carry up to 431 troops. The vessels also have davits for four vehicle and personnel landing craft (LCVPs) and could carry four pontoon causeway sections along the sides of the hull.

Barbour County was initially armed with four Mark 33 3-inch (76 mm)/50 caliber guns in two twin turrets. The vessel was equipped with two Mk 63 gun control fire systems (GCFS) for the 3-inch guns, but these were removed in 1977–1978. The ship also had SPS-10 surface search radar. Atop the stern gate, the vessels mounted a helicopter deck. They had a maximum complement of 213 including 11 officers.

== Construction and career ==
The LST was ordered as the eighth hull of the third group of the Newport class in Fiscal Year 1967 and a contract was awarded on 15 July 1966. The ship was laid down on 7 November 1970 at San Diego, California, by the National Steel and Shipbuilding Corporation. Named for two counties, one in Alabama, and the other in West Virginia, Barbour County was launched on 15 May 1971, sponsored by the wife of J. Victor Smith. The vessel was commissioned at Long Beach Naval Shipyard on 3 February 1972 and assigned to Amphibious Squadron (PhibRon) 7, based at Long Beach, California. Barbour County completed fitting out and trials in August. After a voyage to Callao, Peru, the LST concluded extended shakedown training in November.

In June 1973 Barbour County and USS Fort Fisher sailed on a training cruise to the Western Pacific for Naval Academy and Naval Reserve Officer Training Corps midshipmen. During the two-month cruise, the vessels visited Pearl Harbor, Hawaii, Yokosuka, Japan, coastal waters off Vietnam, and Hong Kong before returning to Long Beach on 3 August. Following an incident with another LST, Barbour County was sent back to the Western Pacific as its replacement. Once there, Barbour County was used to transport marines between the Philippines, Japan and Guam. On 20 January 1974 Barbour County was among the US vessels that sailed as part of Operation Eagle Pull, an emergency operation in the Gulf of Siam standing off the Cambodian coast ready to evacuate Americans and other foreigners from Phnom Penh, Cambodia. In mid-February the LST departed the gulf, returning to San Diego, on 14 March.

Barbour County began routine operations off the US west coast until early 1975 with the exception of September and early October 1974, when the LST took part in Exercise "Potlatch 1," an amphibious exercise with Canadian forces at the northern end of Vancouver Island. In April 1975, the ship departed for the western Pacific accompanied by sister ship Tuscaloosa. Once there, the two ships joined American naval forces off the coast of South Vietnam to participate in Operation Frequent Wind, the evacuation of Americans, other foreigners, and South Vietnamese from Saigon. The ship then returned to her normal schedule of troop lifts and exercises, calling at Okinawa, Taiwan and Subic Bay, before returning to the United States.

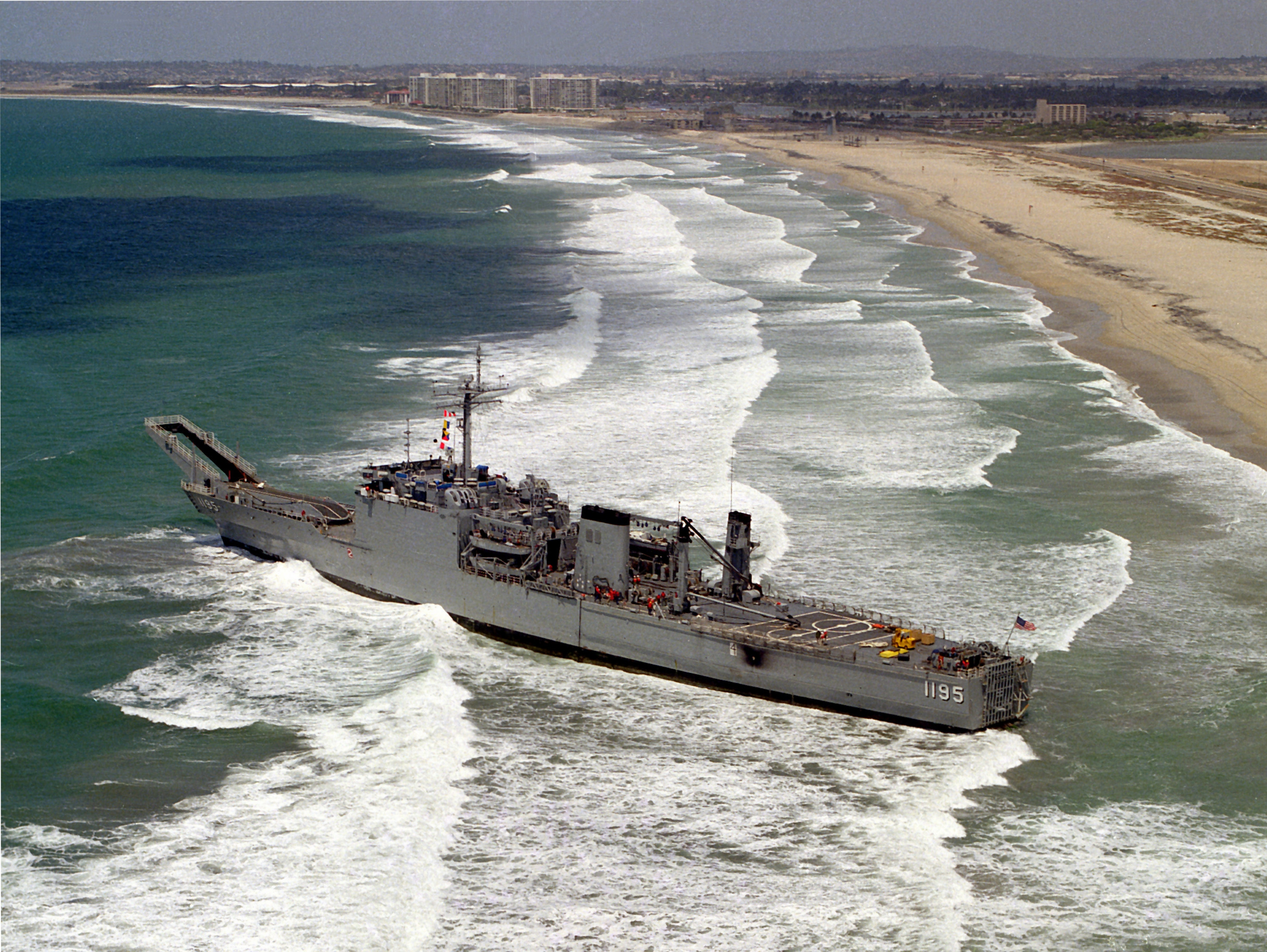
USS Barbour County aground on San Diego's Silver Strand in 1984.

After a nine-month overhaul that ended in March 1977, Barbour County resumed normal operations. From 1977 until 1990, the ship made regular deployments to the western Pacific, based at Subic Bay, taking part in exercises, and making calls to Japan, Thailand, Australia, Korea, and Singapore, before returning to San Diego. On 23 April 1984, while training off San Diego's Silver Strand, Barbour County suffered two small fires, both of which were extinguished. On 25 April, while extracting from a landing, the vessel ran aground. The fleet tugs Quapaw, Narragansett, and the rescue vessel Florikan towed Barbour County off the beach. The LST was taken to San Diego for repairs. While moored alongside on 2 June, the vessel suffered a serious fire. Repaired only enough to be towed, Barbour County was taken to San Pedro, California to undergo an extensive refit at the Todd Pacific Shipyard that would last into 1985. In September 1987, while sailing from Pearl Harbor to Subic Bay, the minesweeper USS Conquest collided with Barbour County during a refueling attempt. Damage to Barbour County was minor and the vessel continued on to Subic Bay. Conquest was forced to return to Pearl Harbor.

=== Gulf War ===
Following the invasion of Kuwait and the beginning of the Gulf War, Barbour County departed San Diego on 1 December 1990 and sailed west, shifting to Central Command's operational control on 12 January 1991. On 17 January, following the start of air operations in Operation Desert Storm, the ship took up a position off Oman. The LST took part in Exercise "Sea Soldier IV" on 26 January, launching and recovering 12 amphibious vehicles near Masirah anchorage. The ship also operated off Fujirah until putting into Dubai for upkeep on 9 February.

Barbour County sailed from Dubai on 20 February due to imminent start of the ground war. The two Military Sealift Command support ships for the 5th Marine Expeditionary Brigade, Flickertail State and Cape Girardeau, could not offload at Al Mishab and were sent south to unload their cargoes at Al Jubayl. Barbour County was sent with them and 253 marines landed on the ship via helicopter. Anchoring off Al Mishab on 25 February, the ship unloaded troops and equipment and returned to sea.

The ship returned to Al Mishab on 2 March and began embarking troops and equipment following the ceasefire in the region. The LST spent the next four weeks in the Persian Gulf on contingency operations. On 7 May, Barbour County sailed into the Arabian Sea. On 12 May, Barbour County was ordered to assist in disaster relief of typhoon in Bangladesh. Anchoring in the Bay of Bengal on 15 May, the ship operated for two weeks in support of Operation Sea Angel. The tank landing ship returned to San Diego on 30 June.

=== Fate ===
Barbour County was decommissioned at San Diego on 30 March 1992. The LST was later towed to the Naval Inactive Ship Maintenance Facility at Pearl Harbor for transfer to a foreign navy. This did not take place, and the ship was struck from the Navy list on 13 July 2001. On 6 April 2004 Barbour County was sunk as a target ship.

== Sources ==
- Blackman, Raymond V. B., ed. (1972). Jane's Fighting Ships 1972–73. London: Sampson Low, Marston & Company. OCLC 28197951.
- Brown, Ronald J., ed. (2000). U. S. Marines in the Persian Gulf, 1990–1991: With Marine Forces Afloat in Desert Shield and Desert Storm. Washington, D.C.: History and Museums Division, Headquarters, U.S. Marine Corps. ISBN 978-0-7881-8563-2.
- Couhat, Jean Labayle, ed. (1986). Combat Fleets of the World 1986/87. Annapolis, Maryland: Naval Institute Press. ISBN 0-85368-860-5.
- "Barbour County". Dictionary of American Naval Fighting Ships. Navy Department, Naval History and Heritage Command.
- Gardiner, Robert; Chumbley, Stephen & Budzbon, Przemysław, eds. (1995). Conway's All the World's Fighting Ships 1947–1995. Annapolis, Maryland: Naval Institute Press. ISBN 1-55750-132-7.
- Moore, John, ed. (1974). Jane's Fighting Ships 1974–75 (77th ed.). New York: Franklin Watts Incorporated. ISBN 0-531-02743-0.
- Moore, John, ed. (1975). Jane's Fighting Ships 1975–76 (78th ed.). New York: Franklin Watts Incorporated. ISBN 0-531-03251-5.
- Moore, John, ed. (1976). Jane's Fighting Ships 1976–77 (79th ed.). New York: Franklin Watts Incorporated. ISBN 0-531-03261-2.
- Moore, John, ed. (1978). Jane's Fighting Ships 1978–79 (81st ed.). New York: Franklin Watts Incorporated. ISBN 0-531-03297-3.
- Sharpe, Richard, ed. (1990). Jane's Fighting Ships 1990–91 (93 ed.). Surrey, United Kingdom: Jane's Information Group. ISBN 0-7106-0904-3.
