= USNS Catawba =

Tugboat of the United States Navy

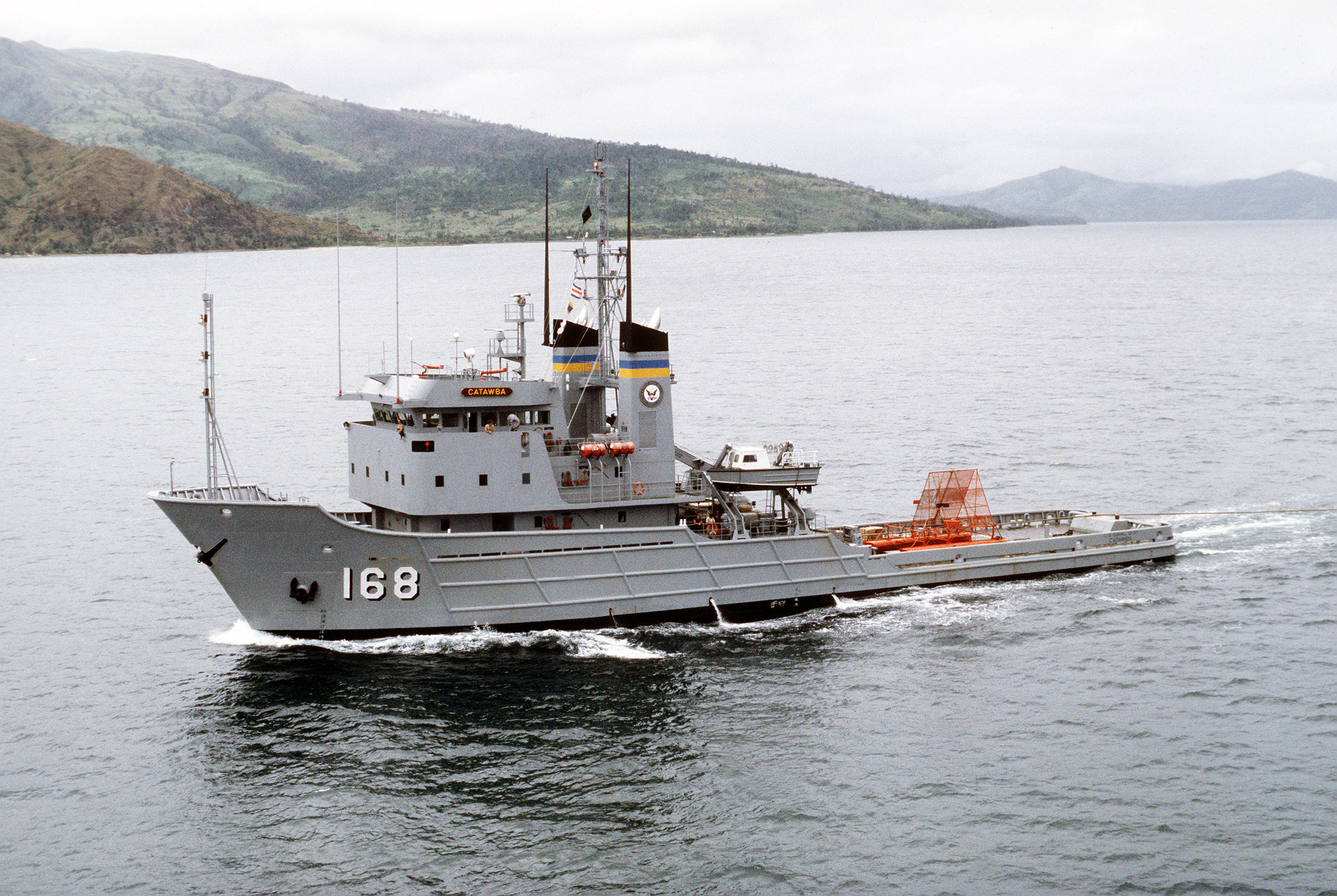
- USNS Catawba underway

History

United States
- Name: USNS Catawba (T-ATF-168)
- Namesake: The Catawba tribe, a Native American people of the southeast United States
- Owner: United States Navy
- Operator: Military Sealift Command
- Awarded: 12 September 1975
- Builder: Marinette Marine
- Laid down: 14 December 1977
- Launched: 22 September 1979
- Acquired: 28 May 1980
- Identification: IMO number: 8835487; MMSI number: 367846000; Callsign: NCDS
- Status: in active service

General characteristics
- Class & type: Powhatan-class tugboat
- Displacement: 2,260 tons full
- Length: 226 ft (69 m)
- Beam: 42 ft (13 m)
- Draft: 15 ft (4.6 m)
- Complement: 16 civilian, 4 navy

USNS Catawba is a Powhatan-class tugboat operated by the Military Sealift Command for the United States Navy. It is currently based in Manama, Bahrain. It was launched in 1979 and is the last ship of its class still in service. In December 2020, the Navy announced its intention to retire Catawba during fiscal year 2023.

== Construction and characteristics ==
The contract for the first four Powhatan-class tugs was awarded to Marinette Marine on 12 September 1975. Catawba was the third of these vessels to be launched. The contract price for the four ships was $30.5 million.

Catawba's keel was laid down on 14 December 1977 at Marinette's shipyard. She was launched on 22 September 1979, and christened by Mrs. James R. Derusha, wife of the president of Marinette Marine. The ship was delivered to the Navy on 28 May 1980.

Catawba's hull is built of welded steel plates. The ship is 225 feet 11 inches (68.86 m) long, with a beam of 42 feet (13 m), and a draft of 15 feet (4.6 m). She displaces 2,260 tons fully loaded.

Catawba has two controllable-pitch Kort-nozzle propellers for propulsion. She has two 20-cylinder Diesel engines, GM EMD 20-645F7B, which provide 4,500 shaft horsepower. These can drive the ship at 15 knots. She also has a 300-horsepower bow thruster to improve maneuverability.

Electrical power aboard the ship is provided by three 400 Kw generators. These are powered by four Detroit Diesel 8v-71 engines.

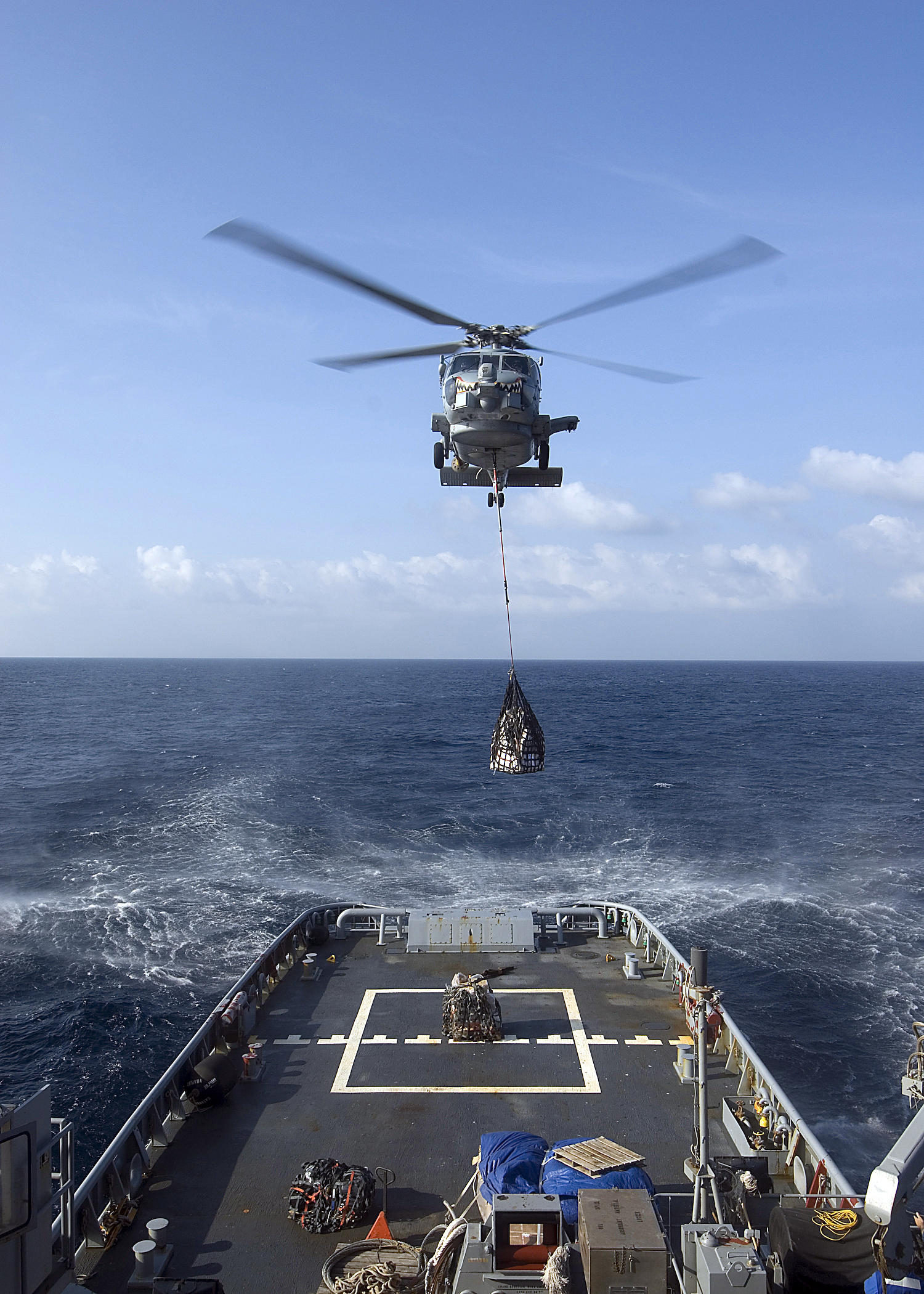
Vertical Replenishment operations aboard Catawba

The ship is expected to have global range in order to support the U.S. fleet across oceans. Her tankage is consequently large. She can carry 206,714 U.S. gallons (782,500 L) of Diesel oil, 6,100 U.S. gallons (23,000 L) of lube oil, and 6,000 U.S. gallons (23,000 L) of drinking water.

Like all MSC ships, Catawba is crewed by civilian mariners. Her complement includes 16 civilian crew. There is also a 4-person military detachment of communications specialists aboard. The ship can accommodate an additional 16 people aboard for transient, mission-specific roles.

Catawba's aft deck is largely open and accommodates a number of different roles. One of the original missions of a fleet tug was to tow damaged warships back to port. The ship's aft deck is equipped with a SMATCO 66 DTS-200 towing winch for service as a towboat. She has a 10-ton capacity crane for moving loads on her aft deck. There are connections to bolt down shipping containers. The deck space has been used to receive supplies from helicopter vertical replenishment operations. Unmanned underwater vehicles have been launched and recovered from Catawba's deck.

All the ships of the Powhatan-class are named after Native American tribes. Catawba's namesake tribe was the Catawba people, a leading tribe of the Carolinas. She is the fifth U.S. Navy ship to bear this name.

== Ship history ==
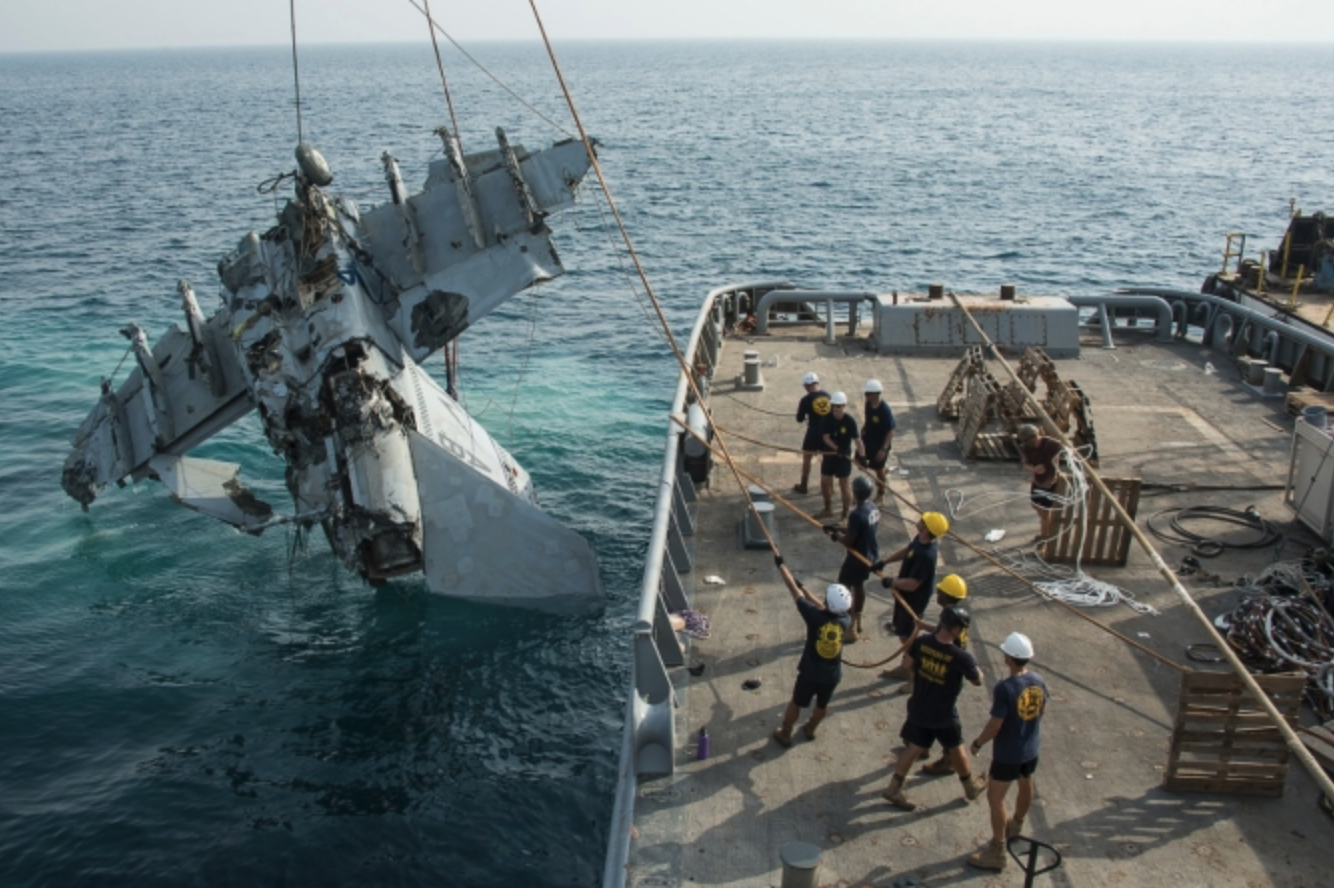
USNS Catawba recovering an F/A-18 in the Persian Gulf on 22 July 2015

In 1983, the ship participated in a joint exercise with the Korean military in "Team Spirit '83".

Catawba towed ex-Grayback from Subic Bay, Philippines where she was sunk in an exercise in August 1986.

In April 1993, Catawba moored in Mombasa, Kenya. She took aboard a containerized version of the Navy's Cable-controlled Underwater Vehicle (CURV), a deep diving salvage and recovery vehicle. Catawba and CURV formed the hub of a salvage effort to recover a Marine Corps CH-46E Sea Knight helicopter that crashed off the coast of Somalia. The effort was successful, and the helicopter reached the surface on 1 May 1993.

In 1994 the ship participated in the recovery of an F/A-18C that crashed into Persian Gulf.

In August 2000, Catawba assisted Bahraini authorities in recovering wreckage and bodies from the crash of Gulf Air Flight 072.

In October 2000, the ship towed the bomb-damaged USS Cole away from Aden to the heavy-lift ship that would carry her back to the United States.

USNS Catawba was deployed to the Northern Persian Gulf during the second Gulf War (Feb-Mar 2003). Her divers provided critical assistance in recovering the bodies of aircrew from two 849 Naval Air Squadron Sea King ASaC.7 helicopters which had collided on 22 March 2003 off the Al-Faw Peninsula, while operating from HMS Ark Royal.

In May 2008, Catawba participated in the "Goalkeeper III" fleet exercise in the Persian Gulf.

In 2009, Catawba provided MV Faina with food, water, and medical supplies after that ship was released by Somali pirates.

She participated in the International Mine Countermeasures Exercise in the Persian Gulf in 2013.

Catawba served as a salvage base to recover an F/A-18 Super Hornet that crashed in the Persian Gulf in July 2015.

The ship participated in "Artemis Trident '19" a multi-national fleet exercise in the Persian Gulf in 2019.

== Awards and honors ==
Catawba and her crew have earned a number of honors and awards during her service. These include:

- Armed Forces Expeditionary Medal: 1993, 1996, 1997, 1998
- Navy Expeditionary Medal: For service in the Indian Ocean/Iran 1981,1991
- Meritorious Unit Commendation: 1983
- Navy "E" Ribbon: 1981-1982
- Southwest Asia Service Medal: 1991
