= USNS Mohawk =

Tugboat of the United States Navy

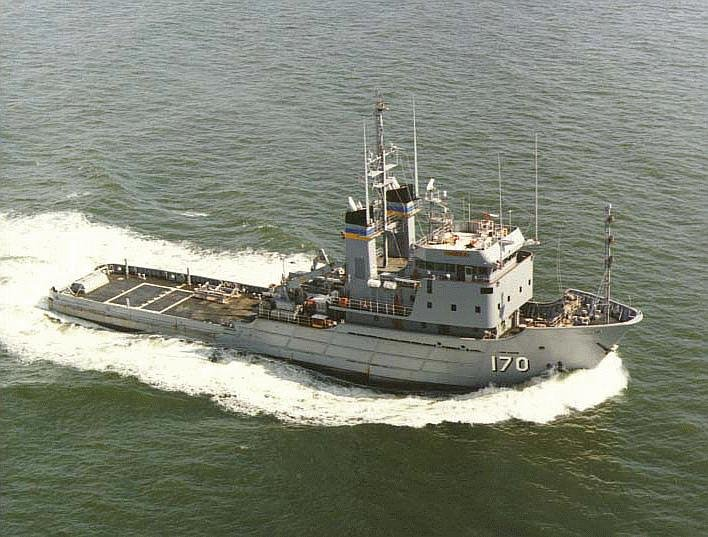
- USNS Mohawk at sea, 5 July 1989.

History

United States
- Name: USNS Mohawk
- Namesake: The Mohawk people, a Native American tribe
- Builder: Marinette Marine Corporation, Marinette, Wisconsin
- Laid down: 22 March 1979
- Launched: 5 April 1980
- In service: 16 October 1980
- Out of service: 15 August 2005
- Stricken: 31 August 2015
- Fate: Scrapped in Brownsville, 2023

General characteristics
- Class & type: Powhatan-class tugboat
- Displacement: 2,260 tons
- Length: 226 ft (68.9 m)
- Beam: 42 ft (12.8 m)
- Draft: 15.1 ft (4.6 m)
- Propulsion: 2 GM EMD 20-645F7B diesels
- Speed: 15 knots (28 km/h)
- Complement: 16 civilians and 4 naval communications technicians

USNS Mohawk (T-ATF-170) was a United States Navy Powhatan-class tugboat operated by the Military Sealift Command from 1980 to 2005.

== Construction and characteristics ==
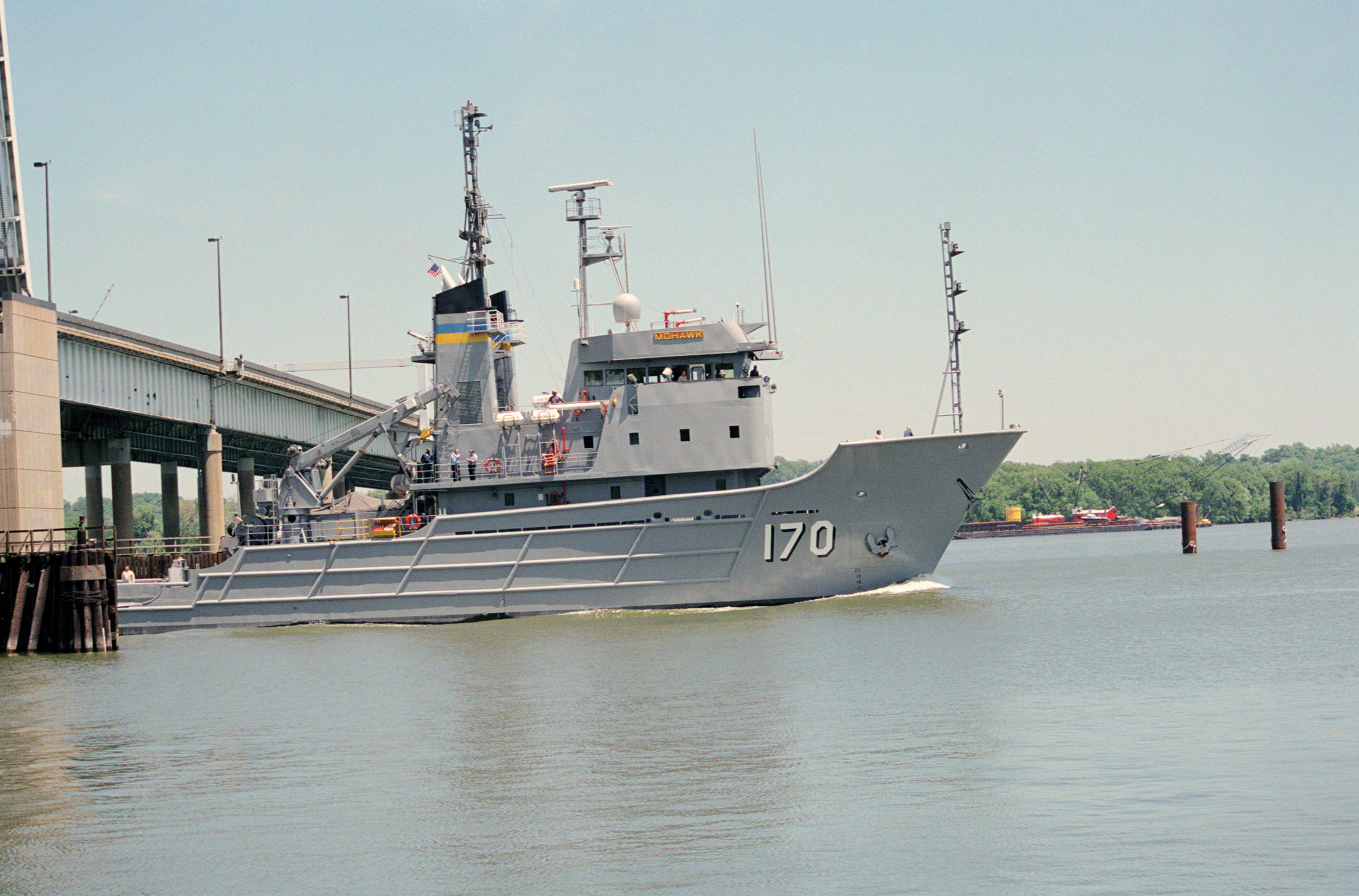
USNS Mohawk passes under the Woodrow Wilson Memorial Bridge between Maryland and Virginia on the Potomac River just south of Washington, D.C.

The contract for the first four Powhatan-class tugs was awarded to Marinette Marine Co. on 12 September 1975. The Navy exercised its option to buy an additional three ships under this contract on 27 February 1978. Mohawk was the first ship delivered under the contract extension.

Mohawk was laid down on 23 March 1979 at the company's Marinette, Wisconsin shipyard. She was launched on 5 April 1980, and delivered to the Navy on 16 October 1980.

Her hull was built of welded steel plates. She was 225 feet 11 inches (68.86 m) long at the waterline and 240 feet 1 inch (73.18 m) overall, with a beam of 42 feet (13 m), and a draft of 15 feet (4.6 m). She displaced 2,260 tons fully loaded.

As originally built, Mohawk had two controllable-pitch Kort-nozzle propellers for propulsion. She had two 20-cylinder Diesel engines, GM EMD 20-645F7B, which provided 4,500 shaft horsepower. These would drive the ships at 15 knots. She also had a 300-horsepower bow thruster to improve maneuverability.

Electrical power aboard the ship was provided by three 400 Kw generators. These were powered by four Detroit Diesel 8v-71 engines.

Powhatan-class tugs had global range in order to support the U.S. fleet across oceans. Mohawk's tankage was consequently large. She could carry 206,714 U.S. gallons (782,500 L) of Diesel oil, 6,100 U.S. gallons (23,000 L) of lube oil, and 6,000 U.S. gallons (23,000 L) of drinking water. Her unrefueled range at 13 knots was 10,000 miles (16,000 km)

Mohawk's aft deck was largely open to accommodate a number of different roles. It had 4,000 square feet (370 m^{2}) of working space. One of the missions of a fleet tug was to tow disabled warships back to port. She was equipped with a SMATCO 66 DTS-200 towing winch for service as a towboat. The towing system could accommodate either wire rope or synthetic-fiber hawsers and produce as much as 90 short tons of bollard pull. She had a 10-ton capacity crane for moving loads on the aft deck. There were connections to bolt down shipping containers and other equipment.

Like all MSC ships, Mohawk was crewed by civilian mariners. At launch, her complement was 16 civilian crew and a 4-person military detachment of communications specialists. The ship could accommodate an additional 16 people aboard for transient, mission-specific roles.

All the ships of the Powhatan-class were named after Native American tribes. Mohawk was named after the Mohawk people, of southeastern Canada and northern New York.

== Service history ==
In February 1982 Mohawk was used as a dive platform to investigate the crash of an F-4E Phantom II in shallow water 30 miles southeast of Charleston, South Carolina. The sea was so stormy that two dives had to be abandoned because the ship was dragging her 2,500 pound stern anchor. She came back to Charleston and borrowed a 4-ton anchor from USCGC Escape before heading back to the crash site. Mohawk was ultimately successful in recovering portions of the plane.

She towed floating drydock pontoons from Charleston, South Carolina to Holy Loch, Scotland in 1982.

During the Fall of 1985 and the winter of 1985-1986 Mohawk was deployed to the Caribbean to track and report on suspicious vessels as part of the war on drugs.

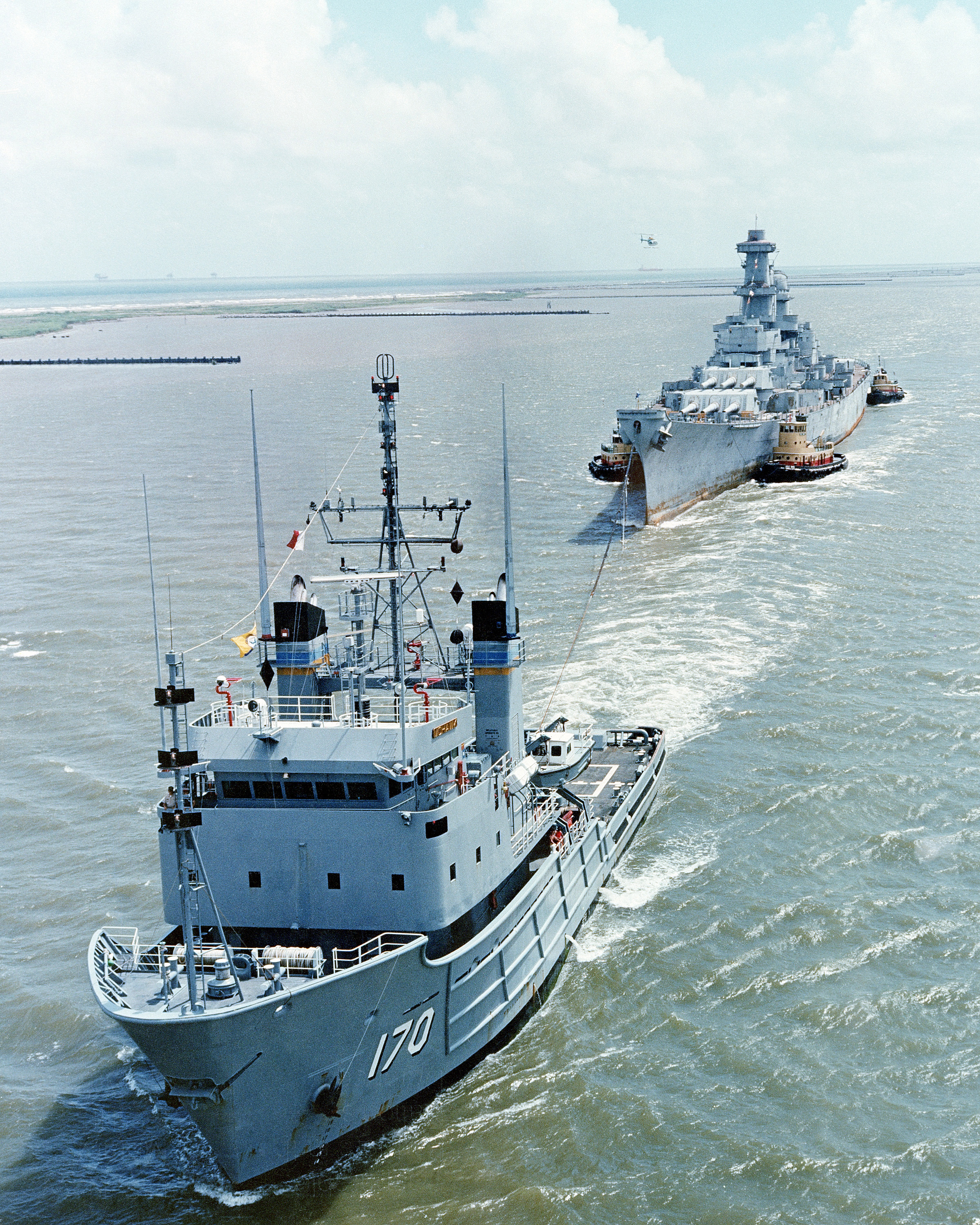
Mohawk towing ex-Wisconsin in August 1986

Mohawk departed the Philadelphia Naval Shipyard on 1 August 1986 with ex-Wisconsin in tow. They were accompanied by USS Edenton. They arrived in New Orleans on 15 August where ex-Wisconsin was put into drydock at the Avondale shipyard as a step towards reactivation.

On 15 December 1987 the Kuwaiti oil tanker Qarouh collided with the Panamanian freighter Explorer about 700 miles off the coast of Florida. Mohawk was the first vessel on the scene of the accident and took all 29 members of the tanker's crew aboard since Qarouh appeared to be sinking.

On 28 January 1989, Mohawk worked with USNS Grasp to pull the grounded USS Spruance off a coral reef near Andros Island, in the Bahamas.

Public tours of Mohawk were offered on 24–25 March 1990 at the Port Canaveral Seafood Festival, on 19 May 1991 at the Washington Navy Yard, and in October 1992 as part of the Wilmington, North Carolina Riverfest. This was an effort to recruit mariners into the Military Sealift Command.

In the fall of 1992, Mohawk exercised with the Royal Navy frigate HMS Lancaster off Virginia Beach. Mohawk towed Empress II, which generated high-power microwave pulses, in order to test the electronic hardening of the British ship. Over the course of 12 days, Lancaster was able to operate within 200 yards of Empress II without significant damage.

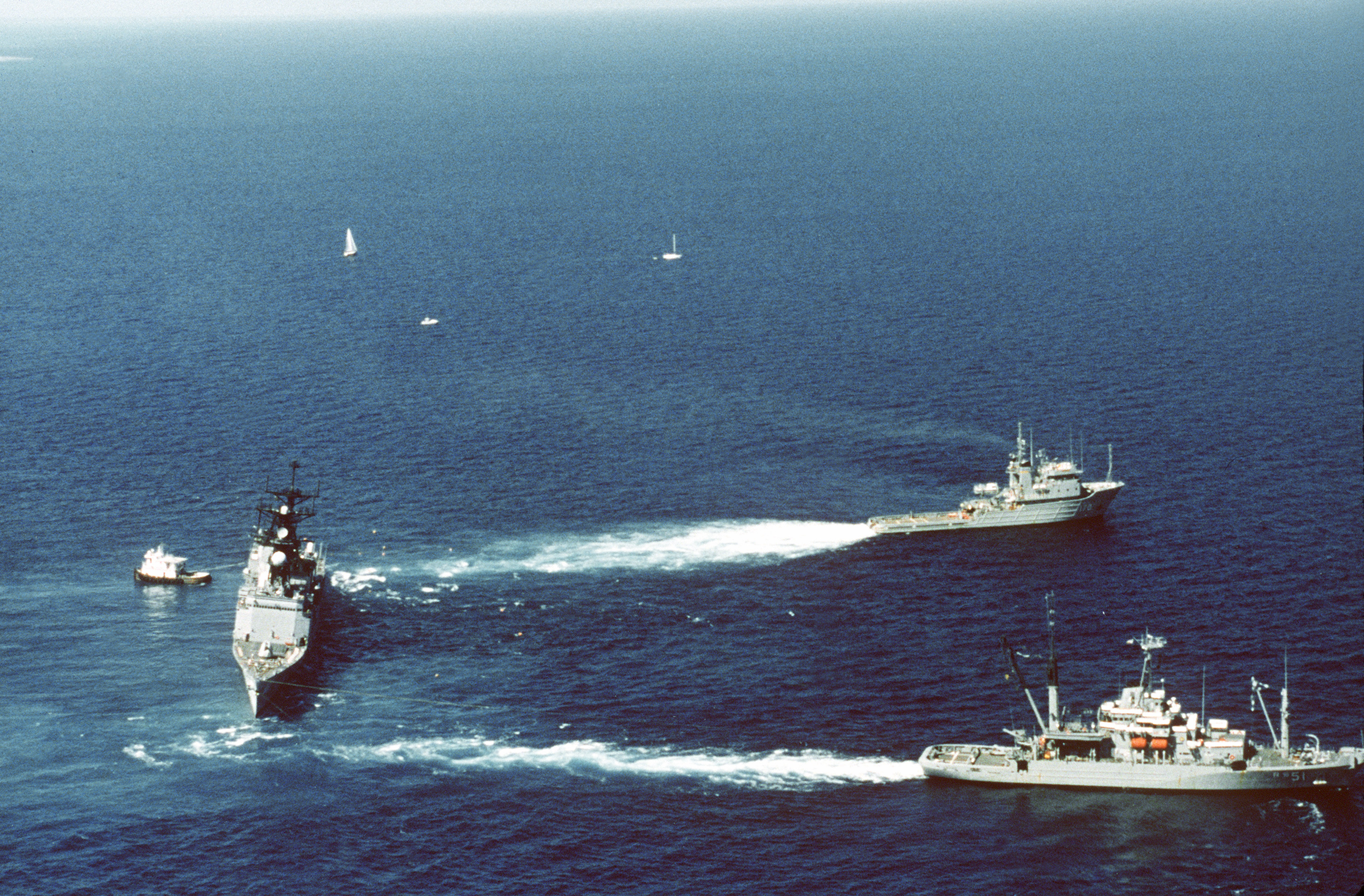
Mohawk and USS Grasp pull USS Spruance off a coral reef in the Bahamas in 1989

During the spring of 1993, Mohawk worked with USNS Grasp, USNS Grapple, and Mobile Diving and Salvage Unit Two to raise the coastal freighter Wendy. The wreck was leaking fuel which threatened the world's second largest coral reef system and blocked a harbor mouth on the Honduran island Roatan.

On 3 April 1993, Mohawk recovered the wreckage of an F-15 that crashed in the Gulf of Mexico. The parts of the aircraft were loaded onto LCAC 058 which brought them to Tyndall Air Force Base for the crash investigation.

In February 1995, Mohawk recovered the wreckage of a T-34C Turbo Mentor that crashed in the Gulf of Mexico off Corpus Christi.

In June 1995, Mohawk towed ex-Inchon from Naval Station Ingleside, Texas to the Naval Inactive Ship Maintenance Facility in Philadelphia.

Mohawk towed ex-Mississippi from Norfolk to the Panama Canal in March 1998. Here the tow was taken over by USNS Navajo which took the ship on to Bremerton, Washington. The ship returned to Norfolk to take USS Sam Rayburn (MTS-635) under tow on 31 March 1998.

On 10 October 1999 Mohawk took ex-Guadalcanal in tow at the Naval Inactive Ship Facility in Philadelphia with the intent to move her to Hampton Roads, Virginia. The tow was mishandled and Mohawk's tow-guide assembly broke apart and injured one of her crew.

Mohawk was dispatched to waters off Nantucket in November 1999 to investigate the crash of EgyptAir Flight 990. On this mission she teamed with USNS Grapple, and NOAAS Whiting.

Mohawk towed ex-Guam from Norfolk Naval Shipyard to an exercise area in the Atlantic. The old amphibious assault ship was sunk by the carrier air wing of USS John F. Kennedy on 16 October 2001.

During June 2004, Mohawk towed ex-Leahy from the Panama Canal to the Naval Inactive Shipp Maintenance Facility in Beaumont, Texas.

=== Sixth Fleet deployments ===
Mohawk was regularly deployed to the Mediterranean to support Sixth Fleet operations as a towing, diving, and salvage asset.

1995: In September, Mohawk moored in Constanta, Romania in support of Exercise Poseidon '95. The embarked Detachment Bravo of Mobile Diving and Salvage Unit Two trained with its Romanian counterparts on diving and salvage techniques. Other port calls included Mahon, Spain.

1998: Port calls included Rhodes, Greece.

2000-2001: The deployment was for six months. Detachment Alpha of Mobile Diving and Salvage Unit Two was embarked. Mohawk completed a joint exercise with Bulgarian divers in the waters off Varna, Bulgaria, and similar exercises in Egypt, and Croatia. Other port calls included La Maddelena, Sardinia, Valletta, Malta, and Palma de Majorca.

2003: Port calls included Valletta, Malta.

2005: Port calls included La Spezia, Italy.

== Deactivation ==
Mohawk was taken out of service on 16 August 2005 and placed in reserve in the Naval Inactive Ship Maintenance Facility at Philadelphia, Pennsylvania. At one point, the Defense Security Cooperation Agency authorized her sale to the Chilean Navy for $3 million under the Excess Defense Article program. On 16 May 2016 this authority was revoked. As of January 2018, the U.S. Maritime Administration, which manages retired Navy ships, was planning to scrap Mohawk.

On 1 September 2023, Mohawk was removed from the Philadelphia NIMSF and began its journey to Brownsville, Texas, where it will be scrapped.

== Awards and honors ==
Mohawk and her crew earned a number of awards and honors. These include:

- Armed Forces Service Medal in 1996
- Navy Meritorious Unit Commendation award in 1995
- Navy "E" ribbon in 1981, 1982, and 1989
- Military Sealift Command's "Smart Ship" award in 1982 as the top ship of her class.
