= USNS Navajo (T-ATF-169) =

Tugboat of the United States Navy

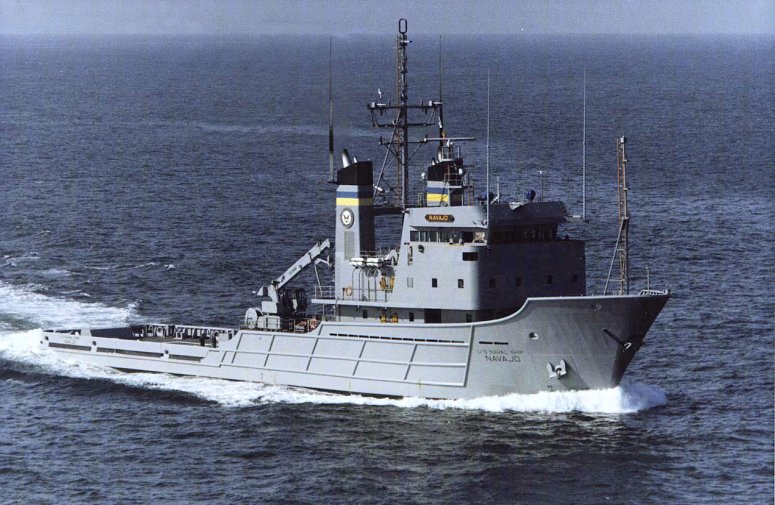
- USNS Navajo off Southern California on 10 September 1997.

History

United States
- Name: USNS Navajo (T-ATF-169)
- Namesake: The Navajo people of the southwestern United States
- Builder: Marinette Marine Corporation, Marinette, Wisconsin
- Laid down: 14 December 1977
- Launched: 20 December 1979
- Acquired: 13 June 1980
- In service: 1980
- Out of service: 1 October 2016
- Identification: Callsign: NOYK
- Fate: Deactivated to Naval Inactive Ship Maintenance Facility
- Status: Deactivated
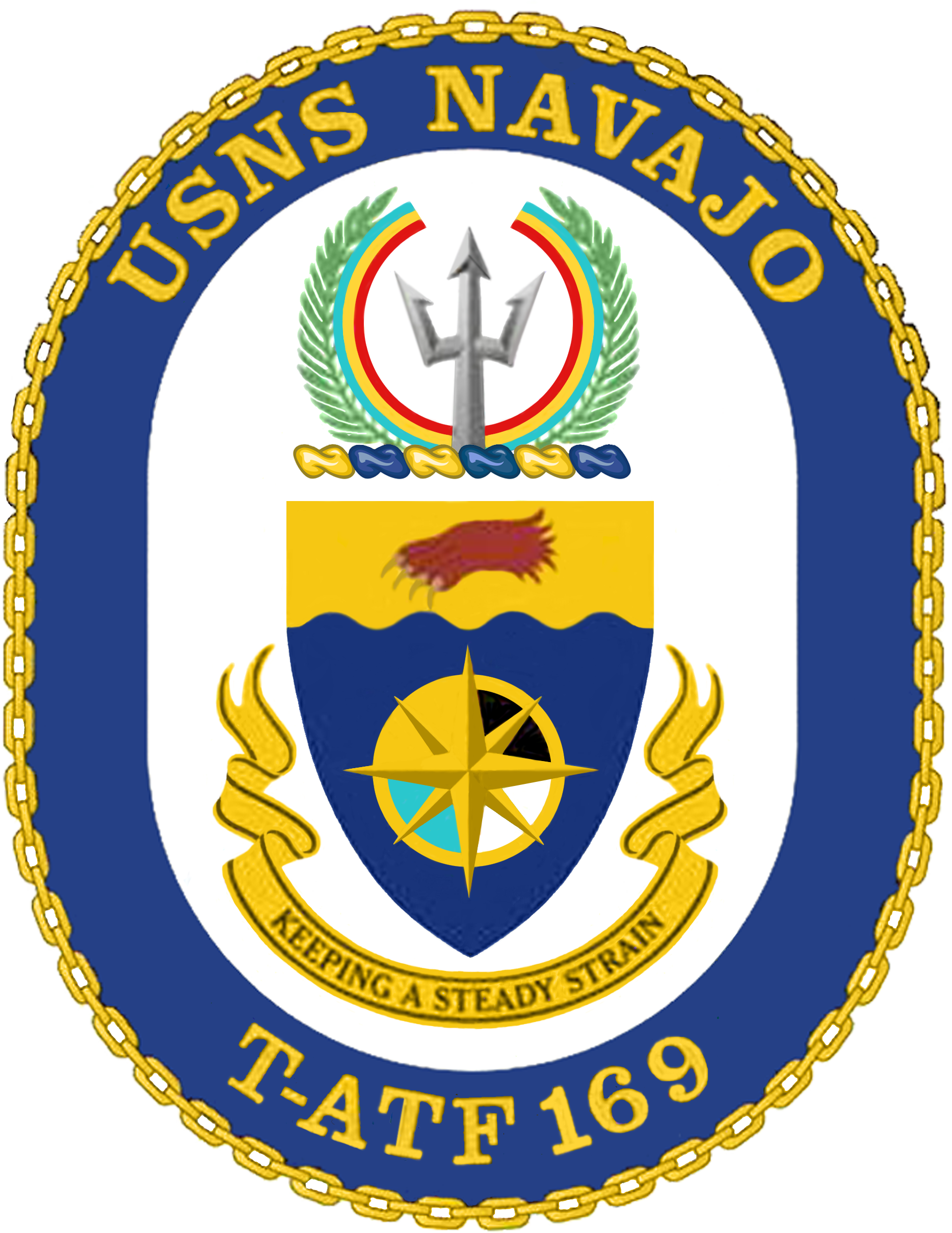
- Badge

General characteristics
- Class & type: Powhatan-class tugboat
- Displacement: 2,260 long tons (2,296 t) full load
- Length: 226 ft (69 m)
- Beam: 42 ft (13 m)
- Draft: 15 ft (4.6 m)
- Installed power: 5.73 megawatts (4,280 horsepower) sustained
- Propulsion: 2 × General Motors EMD 20-645F7B diesel engines, two shafts; bow thruster, 300 hp (224 kW)
- Speed: 15 knots (28 km/h; 17 mph)
- Complement: 16 civilians plus 4 U.S. Navy personnel (communications unit)

USNS Navajo (T-ATF-169) is a United States Navy Powhatan-class tugboat which was operated by the Military Sealift Command from 1980 to 2016. She spent the bulk of her career in the Pacific and is currently moored in Pearl Harbor, awaiting disposal.

== Construction and characteristics ==
The contract for the first four Powhatan-class tugs was awarded to Marinette Marine Co. on 12 September 1975. The contract price for the four ships was $30.5 million. Navajo was the fourth ship built under this initial contract award. The ship was laid down on 14 December 1977 at the company's Marinette, Wisconsin shipyard. Navajo was launched on 20 December 1979, and delivered to the Navy on 13 June 1980.

Her hull was built of welded steel plates. She was 225 feet 11 inches (68.86 m) long at the waterline and 240 feet 1 inch (73.18 m) overall, with a beam of 42 feet (13 m), and a draft of 15 feet (4.6 m). She displaced 2,260 tons fully loaded.

As originally built, Navajo had two controllable-pitch Kort-nozzle propellers for propulsion. She had two 20-cylinder Diesel engines, GM EMD 20-645F7B, which provided 4,500 shaft horsepower. These would drive the ships at 15 knots. She also had a 300-horsepower bow thruster to improve maneuverability.

Electrical power aboard the ship was provided by three 400 Kw generators. These were powered by four Detroit Diesel 8v-71 engines.

Powhatan-class tugs had global range in order to support the U.S. fleet across oceans. Navajo's tankage was consequently large. She could carry 206,714 U.S. gallons (782,500 L) of Diesel oil, 6,100 U.S. gallons (23,000 L) of lube oil, and 6,000 U.S. gallons (23,000 L) of drinking water. Her unrefueled range at 13 knots was 10,000 miles (16,000 km)

Navajo's aft deck was largely open to accommodate a number of different roles. It had 4,000 square feet (370 m^{2}) of working space. One of the missions of a fleet tug was to tow damaged warships back to port. She was equipped with a SMATCO 66 DTS-200 towing winch for service as a towboat. The towing system could accommodate either wire rope or synthetic-fiber hawsers and produce as much as 90 short tons of bollard pull. She had a 10-ton capacity crane for moving loads on the aft deck. There were connections to bolt down shipping containers and other equipment.

Like all MSC ships, Navajo was crewed by civilian mariners. At launch, her complement was 16 civilian crew and a 4-person military detachment of communications specialists. The ships could accommodate an additional 16 people aboard for transient, mission-specific roles.

All the ships of the Powhatan-class were named after Native American tribes. Navajo was named after the Navajo people, of the United States southwest.

== Service history ==
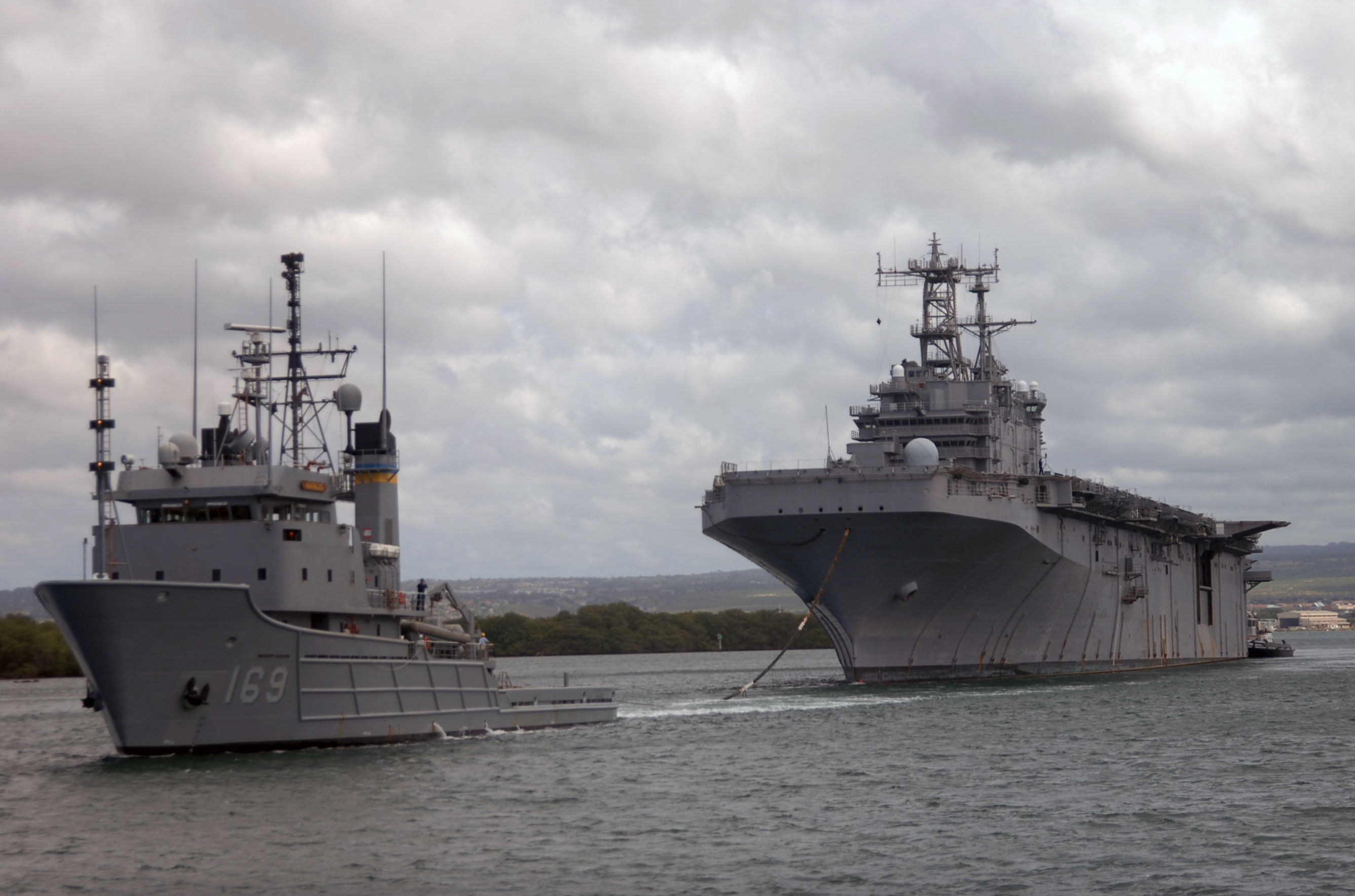
Navajo tows ex-Belleau Wood from Pearl Harbor for RIMPAC 2006

An engine room fire disabled USNS Taluga northwest of San Diego in April 1981. Navajo was dispatched to bring her back to port. On 10 June 1981, Navajo, took USNS Hudson under tow. She was dead in the water off San Nicholas Island at the time.

The large, open aft deck of the Powhatan-class tugs, combined with the 10-ton crane made them capable platforms for salvage missions. Navajo was called upon several times in this role. In July 1988 she assisted in the recovery of a MH-53E Sea Dragon helicopter which crashed off San Francisco. In 2016 she assisted USNS Salvor in recovering the wreckage of two MH-53E helicopters that crashed off Hawaii.

On 1 September 1992, Navajo towed USS White Plains into deeper water after the ship broke her moorings and went aground in Apra Harbor, Guam during Typhoon Omar.

Unexploded ordnance from World War II was discovered off Hilo Bay, Hawaii. Navajo served as a dive platform for Navy crews collecting and detonating the rounds in September 2000.

In September 2008 Navajo exercised with the Chilean Navy's submarine CS Simpson with the Navy's new submarine rescue diving and recompression system.

Navajo was used as a dive platform in a joint US Navy/Indian Navy salvage exercise, SALVEX 2009, in November 2009.

In December 2010 and January 2011, the Navy's deep-ocean recovery system CURV-21 was embarked on Navajo. She was able to determine that a deep water sensor was not stuck on its anchor on the sea bottom at more than 16,000 feet (4,900 m) deep. In a second mission, she was unable to locate an Air Force asset.

In 2003 Navajo towed the Navy's Floating Instrument Platform into San Diego Harbor.

On 28 July 2012 the ship was conducting training near the entrance to Pearl Harbor, Hawaii when a parted mooring line caused the ship to dump 8,000 pounds of expensive anchor, chain, and heavy rope on the ocean floor 150 feet below. The equipment was recovered on 9 August 2012.

In May 2016, Navajo towed the missile tracking barge Mobile Area Targeting Support System (IX524) into Pearl Harbor.

=== Decommissioned ship tows ===
Vessels which are retired from Navy service are often towed to various inactive ship maintenance facilities where they are held in reserve. Ultimately, they are towed on to their final fate. These decommissioned ships do not have full crews and cannot sail under their own power. Navajo was frequently employed to tow decommissioned ships.

Tow	From	To	Date	Notes
ex-New Jersey	Bremerton, Washington	Long Beach	August 1981	The battleship was reactivated. Navajo was accompanied by USNS Sioux on this tow.
Arthur M. Huddel	Guam	Panama Canal	14 December 1982	The tow was expected to take between 40 and 50 days and was one of the longest ever achieved by a fleet tug at the time.
ex-New Jersey	Long Beach	Bremerton, Washington	April 1991	Towed to the Naval Inactive Ship Maintenance Facility, accompanied by USNS Narragansett.
ex-Missouri	Long Beach	Bremerton, Washington	April 1992	USNS Narragansett towed the ship, with Navajo accompanying.
ex-Duncan	Pearl Harbor		January 1995	
ex-Mississippi	Panama Canal	Bremerton, Washington	1998	USNS Mohawk towed the ship from Norfolk to the Panama Canal.
ex-Narwhal	Panama Canal	San Diego	2001	Navajo was accompanied by USNS Sioux on this tow.
ex-Leahy	Suisun Bay	Panama Canal	2004	Leahy was taken in tow on the Atlantic side of the canal by USNS Mohawk to reach the Naval Inactive Ship Maintenance Facility in Beaumont, Texas.
ex-New Orleans	Suisun Bay	Pearl Harbor	19 October 2006	Sunk in RIMPAC 2010
ex-Jouett	Suisun Bay	Pearl Harbor	January 2007	Sunk in fleet exercise Valiant Shield 2007
ex-Knox	Pearl Harbor	Guam	2007	Sunk in fleet exercise Valiant Shield 2007
ex-Fresno	Pearl Harbor	Guam	2014	Sunk in fleet exercise Valiant Shield
ex-Gary	San Diego	Pearl Harbor	16 September 2015	The frigate was ultimately transferred to the Republic of China Navy.

=== RIMPAC participation ===
"Rim of the Pacific" (RIMPAC) is a multinational naval exercise hosted every two years in Hawaiian waters. It typically includes a live-fire exercise during which a decommissioned ship is sunk. Navajo towed several of these vessels on their final voyage, and has participated in other RIMPAC exercises as well.

RIMPAC 2006: Navajo towed ex-Belleau Wood from Pearl Harbor to be sunk.

RIMPAC 2008: Navajo towed ex-Horne from Suisun Bay, California to waters off Hawaii where she was sunk.

RIMPAC 2010: She towed ex-Monticello and ex-Anchorage from Pearl Harbor to where they were sunk.

RIMPAC 2012: She towed ex-Kilauea from San Francisco to Hawaiian waters where she was sunk. She also served as a dive platform for Royal Australian Navy divers.

RIMPAC 2014. Participated

RIMPAC 2016: Navajo towed ex-Thatch from Pearl Harbor to be sunk in the exercise.

== Awards and honors ==
Navajo and her crew earned both the Navy Meritorious Unit Commendation and the U.S. Coast Guard Unit Commendation.

== Deactivation ==
USNS Navajo was deactivated and stricken from the naval vessel register on 1 October 2016. After deactivation Navajo was moored at Pearl Harbor pending final disposition.
