= Powhatan-class tugboat =

U.S. Navy tugboat class

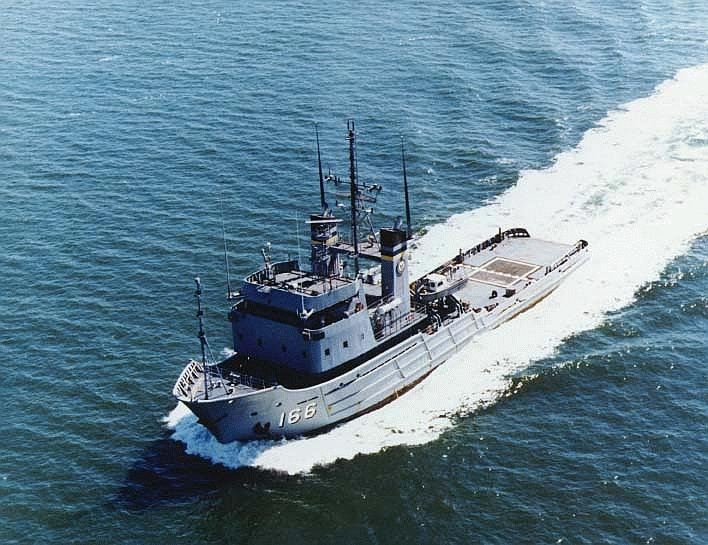
- USNS Powhatan (T-ATF-166) at sea, 16 April 1981.

Class overview
- Name: Powhatan class
- Builders: Marinette Marine Corporation
- Operators: (United States) Military Sealift Command; (Turkey) Turkish Naval Forces
- Preceded by: Abnaki-class fleet ocean tug
- Succeeded by: Navajo-class salvage and rescue ship
- Cost: 11.5–17.6 million USD (1980)
- Built: 1976–1981
- In service: 1979–1981
- In commission: 1979–present
- Completed: 7
- Active: 1
- Retired: 6

General characteristics
- Type: Fleet ocean tug
- Displacement: 2,260 long tons (2,296 t) full load
- Length: 226 ft (69 m)
- Beam: 42 ft (13 m)
- Draft: 15 ft (4.6 m)
- Installed power: (4,280 hp (3,190 kW) sustained
- Propulsion: 2 × General Motors EMD 20-645F7B Diesel engines, two shafts; bow thruster, 300 hp (224 kW)
- Speed: 15 knots (28 km/h; 17 mph)
- Complement: 16 civilians plus 4 U.S. Navy personnel (communications unit)

The Powhatan class of fleet ocean tugs consists of seven ships built for the United States Navy, and operated by the Military Sealift Command (MSC). The lead ship of the class was launched in 1978 and the last ship in MSC service will be deactivated in 2023. During their service life, the Powhatan's were the most powerful tugs owned by the Navy.

== Origins ==
The experiences of World War II influenced the design of Powhatan class.

First, fleet tugs had to be powerful ships, able to tow the Navy's largest combatants when they were damaged in battle or were unable to proceed under their own power. Fleet tug USS Vireo took the bomb-damaged aircraft carrier USS Yorktown under tow during the Battle of Midway in June 1942. She was so under-powered for the task that she could barely keep the carrier on course. Navy aircraft carriers had tripled in displacement by the time the Powhatan class was conceived, requiring much greater towing power than previous fleet ocean tugs.

Second, fleet tugs had to be capable of transoceanic voyages. In July 1944, USS Abnaki sailed from New York to Oran, Algeria towing barges of equipment. On her return voyage to New York, she towed the Free French frigate Senegalais, which had been torpedoed by a U-boat. During World War II, America's military expanded to a global presence, requiring the Powhatan class to have greater range than previous generations of fleet tugs.

The Navy built 22 Abnaki-class fleet tugs during World War II. By the mid-1970's even the youngest was thirty years old, and their capabilities were falling behind the size and range of the ships in the fleet. The Navy Ship Characteristics Board considered a plan for an improved fleet ocean tug to replace the Abnaki class in 1967. Project SCB 724.67 was ultimately cancelled. A modernized fleet tug was taken up again by the Ship Acquisition and Improvement Board, the SCB's successor, in 1973. Its plan SAIB 744.75, dated 28 December 1973, was ultimately approved as part of the fiscal year 1975 budget.

The contract for the first four Powhatan-class tugs was awarded to Marinette Marine on 12 September 1975. The contract price for the four ships was $30.5 million. The contract for the last three ships was awarded 27 February 1978. The total cost of the seven tugs was estimated at $108 million. The Navy originally wanted ten Powhatan-class ships, but cancelled three, saving $51 million in initial procurement costs.

== Construction and characteristics ==
All seven ships of the Powhatan class were built at Marinette Marine's shipyard in Marinette, Wisconsin. Their hull's were built of welded steel plates. The ships were 225 feet 11 inches (68.86 m) long at the waterline and 240 feet 1 inch (73.18 m) overall, with a beam of 42 feet (13 m), and a draft of 15 feet (4.6 m). They displaced 2,260 tons fully loaded.

As originally built, Powhatan-class ships had two controllable-pitch Kort-nozzle propellers for propulsion. They had two 20-cylinder Diesel engines, GM EMD 20-645F7B, which provided 4,500 shaft horsepower. These would drive the ships at 15 knots. They also had a 300-horsepower bow thruster to improve maneuverability.

Electrical power aboard the ships was provided by three 400 Kw generators. These were powered by four Detroit Diesel 8v-71 engines.

Powhatan-class tugs had global range in order to support the U.S. fleet across oceans. Their tankage was consequently large. They could carry 206,714 U.S. gallons (782,500 L) of Diesel oil, 6,100 U.S. gallons (23,000 L) of lube oil, and 6,000 U.S. gallons (23,000 L) of drinking water. Their unrefueled range at 13 knots was 10,000 miles (16,000 km)

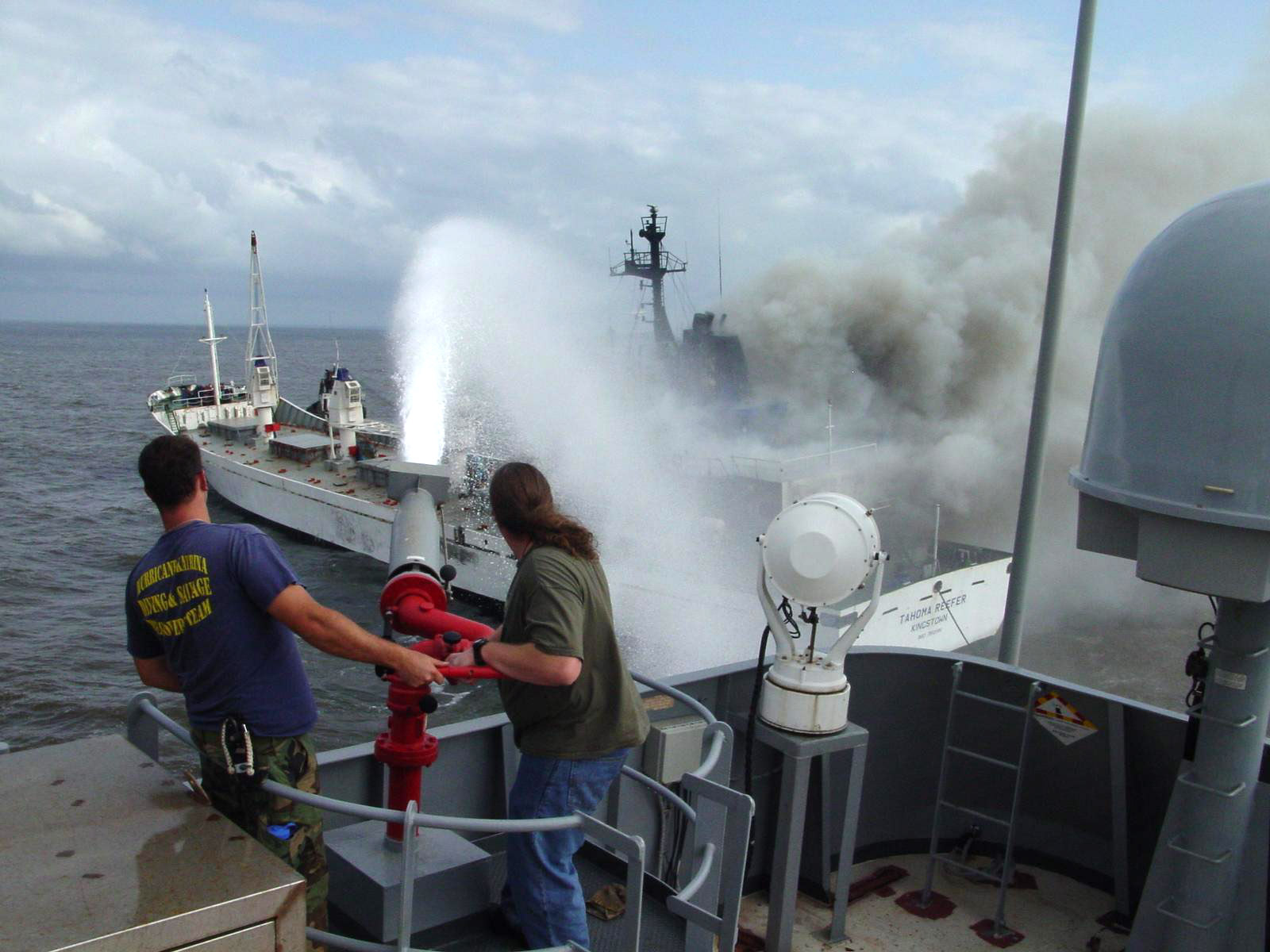
USNS Apache fighting fire aboard Tahoma Reefer

While not combatants themselves, Powhatan-class tugs were designed for deployment to areas of active fighting in order to assist damaged ships. Since battle-damaged ships are often burning, the tugs were equipped with three fire monitors which could pump 2,200 gallons of fire-fighting foam per minute. These were powered by two Detroit Diesel 8v-71 engines. The tugs' powerful pumps could assist damaged ships dewater flooded compartments. Although none of the ships have been armed, there were provisions in their design for mounting two 20-mm guns and two .50 caliber machines guns in time of war.

The aft deck of the Powhatan-class ships was largely open to accommodate a number of different roles. It offers 4,000 square feet (370 m^{2}) of working space. One of the missions of a fleet tug was to tow damaged warships back to port. The ships' aft deck was equipped with a SMATCO 66 DTS-200 towing winch for service as a towboat. The towing system could accommodate either wire rope or synthetic-fiber hawsers and produce as much as 90 short tons of bollard pull. They had a 10-ton capacity crane for moving loads on the aft deck. There were connections to bolt down shipping containers and other equipment. The deck space has been used to receive supplies from helicopter vertical replenishment operations. Unmanned underwater vehicles have been launched and recovered from their decks. A portable diving/decompression module can be embarked to support salvage operations.

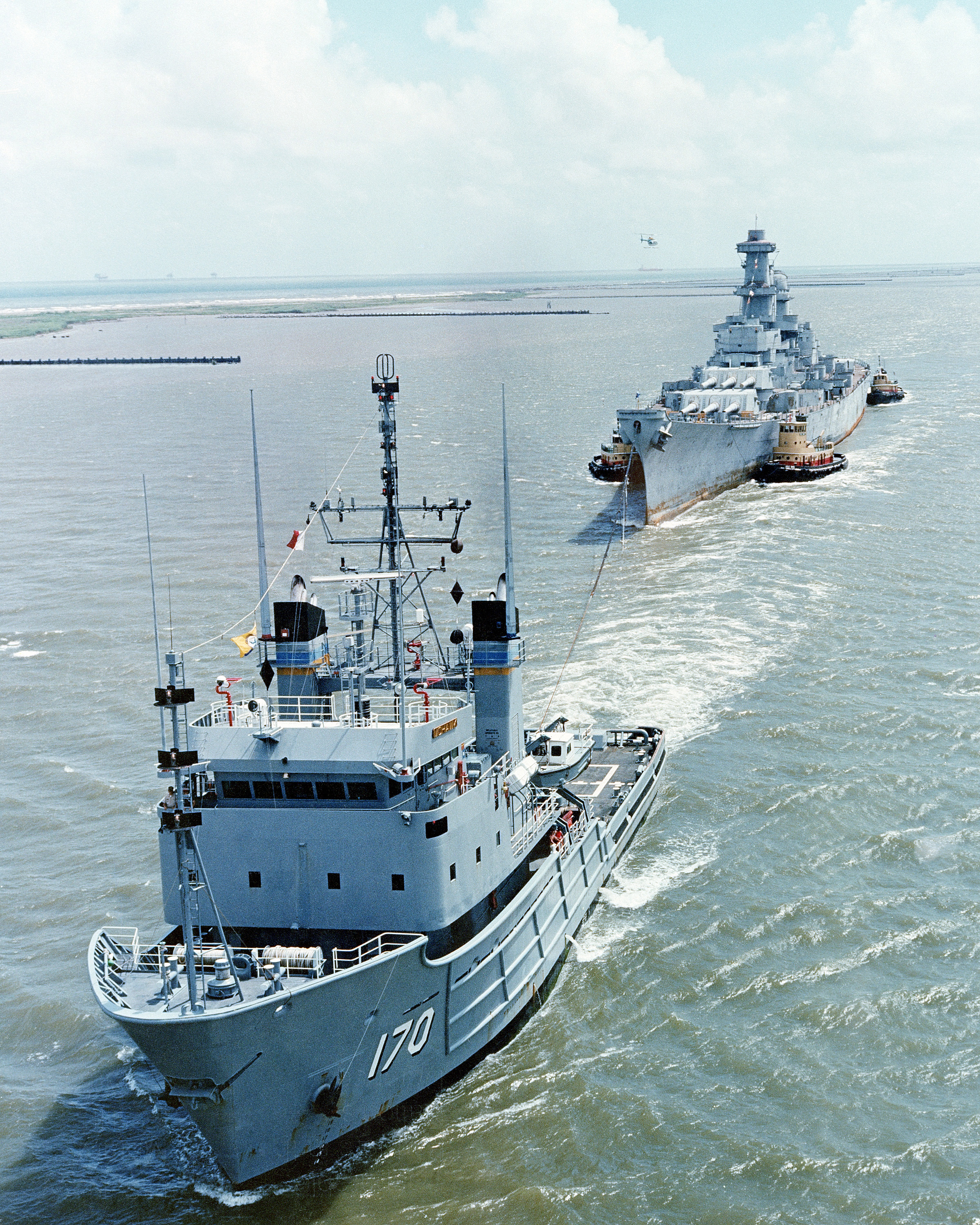
USNS Mohawk towing USS Wisconsin

Like all MSC ships, the Powhatan-class ships were crewed by civilian mariners. At launch, their complement was 16 civilian crew and a 4-person military detachment of communications specialists. The ships could accommodate an additional 16 people aboard for transient, mission-specific roles.

All the ships of the Powhatan-class were named after Native American tribes.

== Retirement and replacement ==
All the Powhatan-class tugs have been retired by MSC, except Catawba, and she is due for retirement in 2023. They will be replaced by the Navajo-class rescue and salvage ships. These will have substantially greater bollard pull, 176 tons, in order to effectively tow the Navy's largest aircraft carriers. Their aft deck will be larger and have more capable connections to support a wide variety embarked equipment for different missions. The crane on the aft deck will be doubled in capacity to 40 tons. They will be equipped with a dynamic-positioning system in order to hover over a lost submarine for rescue operations.

== Ships in the Powhatan class ==
Powhatan-class fleet ocean tugs served as non-commissioned ships assigned to the Military Sealift Command. The activation and deactivation dates below reflect their service with MSC. Several of them served and continue to serve with other organizations.

Name	Penant Number	Keel Laid	Launched	Activated	Deactivated	Notes	Photo
Powhatan	T-ATF-166	30 September 1976	24 June 1978	15 June 1979	26 February 1999	After deactivation, she was leased to Donjon Marine company. At the end of the lease in 2008, she was acquired by the Turkish Navy and commissioned as TCG Inebolu.	
Narragansett	T-ATF-167	5 May 1977	12 May 1979	9 November 1979	30 September 1999	Narragansett has been redesignated TSV-4, a target towing vessel. She is assigned to Carrier Strike Group 4.	
Catawba	T-ATF-168	14 December 1977	22 September 1979	28 May 1980		The Navy has announced its intention to retire Catawba in fiscal year 2023.	
Navajo	T-ATF-169	14 December 1977	20 December 1979	13 June 1980	1 October 2016	Stricken 1 October 2016.	
Mohawk	T-ATF-170	22 March 1979	17 May 1980	16 October 1980	16 August 2005	Stricken 31 August 2015. Scrapped 2023.	
Sioux	T-ATF-171	22 March 1979	15 November 1980	1 May 1981	30 September 2021	Stricken 30 September 2021.	
Apache	T-ATF-172	22 March 1979	28 March 1981	23 July 1981	30 September 2022	Stricken 30 September 2022.	
