= USNS Powhatan =

Tugboat of the United States Navy

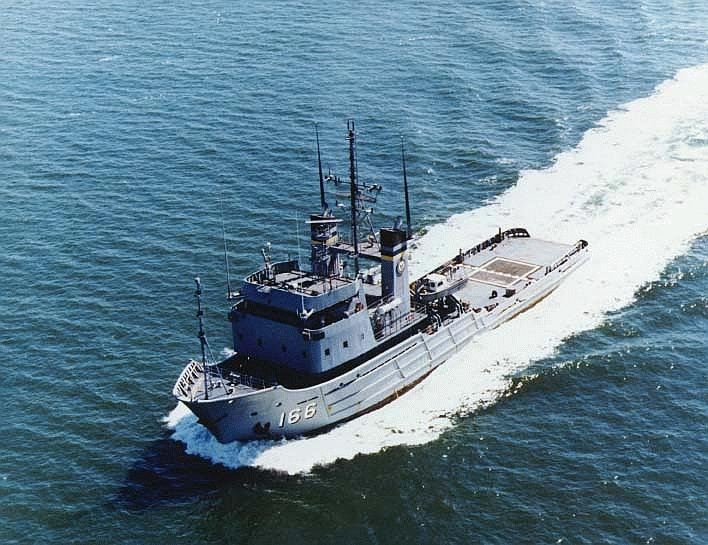
- USNS Powhatan (T-ATF-166) at sea, 16 April 1981.

History

United States
- Name: USNS Powhatan (T-ATF-166)
- Namesake: The Powhatan, a native people of eastern Virginia
- Builder: Marinette Marine Corporation, Marinette, Wisconsin
- Laid down: 30 September 1976
- Launched: 24 June 1978
- Acquired: 15 June 1979
- Out of service: 26 February 1999
- Stricken: 25 February 2008
- Identification: IMO number: 8835578; Call sign NKXR
- Fate: Leased for commercial service 26 February 1999; Sold to Turkey 26 February 2008

Turkey
- Name: TCG İnebolu
- Acquired: 26 February 2008
- Identification: Call sign TBDE
- Status: in active service

General characteristics
- Class & type: Powhatan-class tugboat
- Displacement: 2,260 tons, fully loaded
- Length: 225 ft 11 in (68.86 m)
- Beam: 42 ft (13 m)
- Draft: 15 ft (4.6 m)
- Propulsion: 2 × General Motors EMD 20-645F7B Diesel engines, two shafts; bow thruster, 300 hp (224 kW)
- Speed: 15 knots (28 km/h; 17 mph)
- Complement: 16 civilian mariners plus 4 U.S. Navy personnel

USNS Powhatan (T-ATF-166) was the lead ship of the United States Navy Powhatan-class fleet ocean tugboats. She was in service with the U.S. Navy from 1979 to 1999, and then was leased to a private towing and salvage company. At the end of the lease in 2008, the ship was sold to the Turkish Navy which recommissioned her as TCG Inebolu.

== Construction and characteristics ==
The contract for the first four Powhatan-class tugs was awarded to Marinette Marine on 12 September 1975. Powhatan was the first of these vessels to be launched. The contract price for the four ships was $30.5 million. Powhatan was laid down on 30 September 1976 at Marinette Marine's Marinette, Wisconsin shipyard. She was launched on 24 June 1978. The ship was christened at a ceremony in Marinette on 28 October 1978. Her sponsor was Alice Stratton, who was a Navy wife for 19 years at the time, including six during which her husband, Lieutenant Commander Richard Stratton was a prisoner of war in North Vietnam. Commander Stratton was the principal speaker at the ceremony. Powhatan was delivered to the U.S. Navy on 15 June 1979, and was assigned to the Military Sealift Command (MSC).

Powhatan's hull was built of welded steel plates. The ship is 225 feet 11 inches (68.86 m) long, with a beam of 42 feet (13 m), and a draft of 15 feet (4.6 m). She displaces 2,260 tons fully loaded.

Powhatan has two controllable-pitch Kort-nozzle propellers for propulsion. As originally built, she had two 20-cylinder Diesel engines, GM EMD 20-645F7B, which provided 4,500 shaft horsepower. These could drive the ship at 15 knots. She also had a 300-horsepower bow thruster to improve maneuverability.

Electrical power aboard the ship was provided by three 400 Kw generators. These were powered by four Detroit Diesel 8v-71 engines.

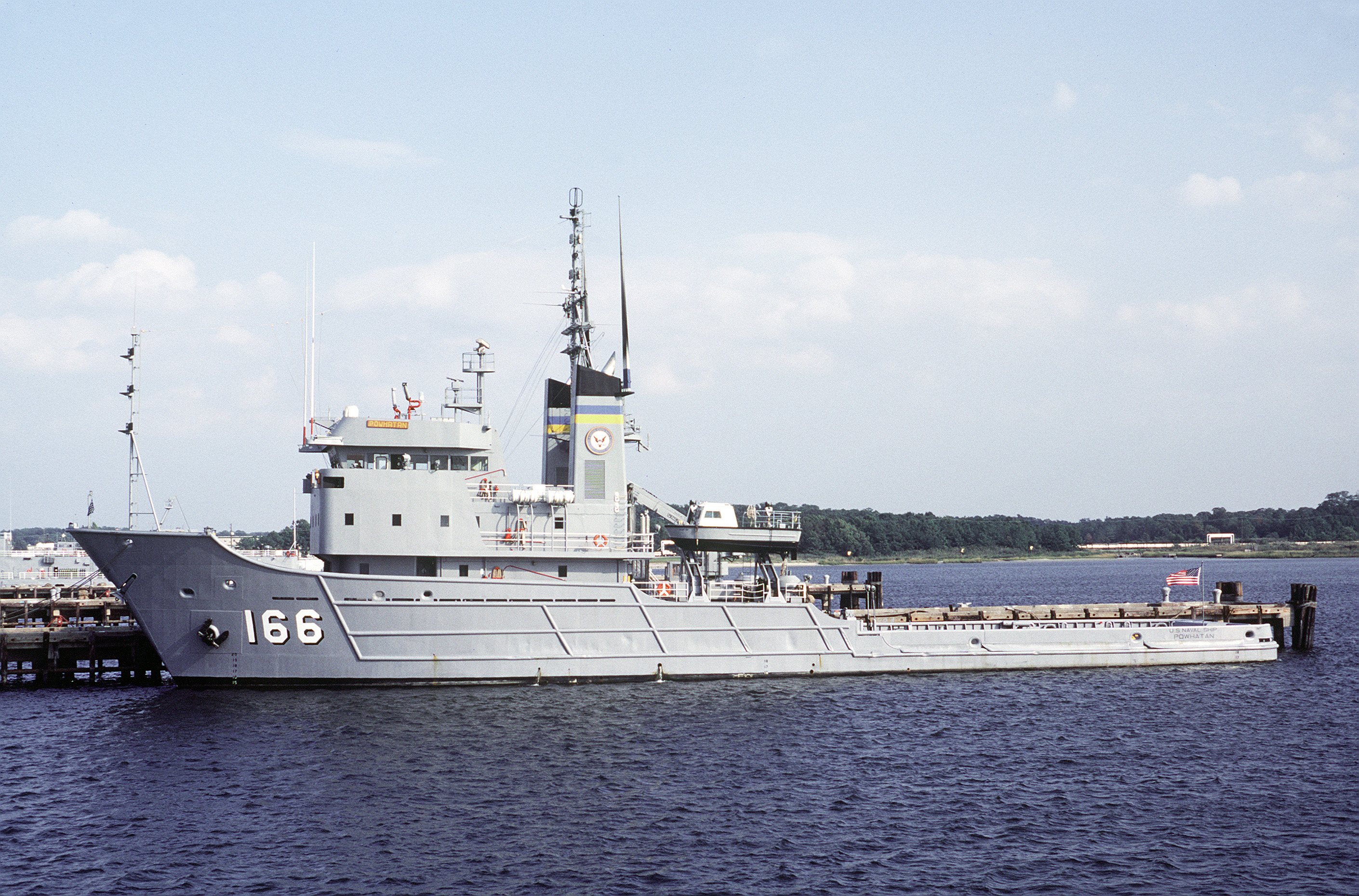
USNS Powhatan in 1983

The ship was expected to have global range in order to support the U.S. fleet across oceans. Her tankage is consequently large. She can carry 206,714 U.S. gallons (782,500 L) of Diesel oil, 6,100 U.S. gallons (23,000 L) of lube oil, and 6,000 U.S. gallons (23,000 L) of drinking water.

Like all MSC ships, Powhatan was crewed by civilian mariners. Her complement included 16 civilian crew. There was also a 4-person military detachment of communications specialists aboard. The ship could accommodate an additional 16 people aboard for transient, mission-specific roles.

Powhatan's aft deck is largely open and accommodates a number of different roles. One of the original missions of a fleet tug was to tow damaged warships back to port. The ship's aft deck is equipped with a SMATCO 66 DTS-200 towing winch for service as a towboat. She has a 10-ton capacity crane for moving loads on her aft deck. There are connections to bolt down shipping containers.

All the ships of the Powhatan-class were named after Native American tribes. Powhatan's namesake was the Powhatan people, a leading tribe of eastern Virginia. A notable member of this tribe was Pocahontas. The tug was the sixth U.S. Navy ship to bear this name.

== U.S. Navy service (1979–1999) ==
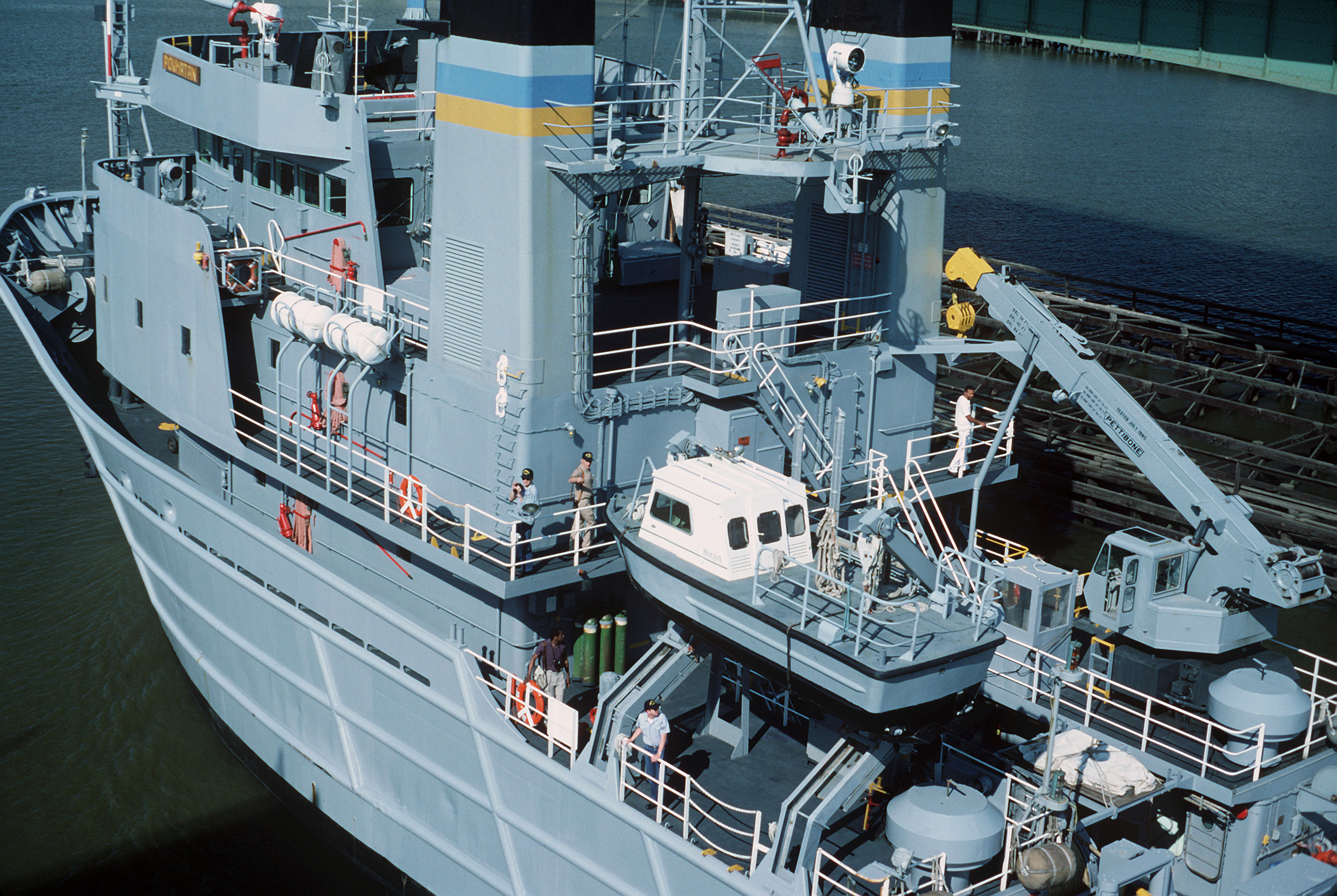
USNS Powhatan showing 10-ton capacity crane

In April 1981, Powhatan played a minor role in the first launch of the space shuttle Columbia. USNS General Hoyt S. Vandenberg, a missile range instrumentation ship, was detailed to support the flight. Regrettably, she had engine trouble and was unable to complete her mission under her own power. Powhatan towed her to her station in time for the flight.

A dive team was embarked, and in July 1985 Powhatan assisted in refloating the beached USS Boulder.

In November 1985 Powhatan was assigned to tow ex-Salmon from Panama to Norfolk, Virginia where the decommissioned submarine was to be used for testing antisubmarine techniques and equipment. While en route, off the coast of Haiti, the rudder locking device on the submarine broke, threatening the tug's ability to tow the hulk. Temporary repairs were made at sea and the two vessels made port at Guantanamo Bay, Cuba, where permanent repairs were completed. The two ship departed Cuba on 20 November 1985.

In October 1986 the ship was in the area of Soviet ballistic missile submarine K-219 that had suffered an explosion and fire approximately 480 miles northeast of Bermuda. The Pentagon announced that Powhatan was standing by to assist, if asked, but the Soviets ordered the tug to stand clear of the sub. The sub sank as Powhatan watched. Water samples taken by the ship showed no release of radioactive elements.

In May 1995, Powhatan towed ex-Saratoga from its former base in Mayport, Florida to the Naval Inactive Ship Maintenance Facility in Philadelphia.

In September 1998, the ship towed ex-Forrestal from Philadelphia to Naval Station Newport in Rhode Island.

Budget cuts forced the Navy to reduce the number of fleet tugs it operated. Powhatan was leased to Donjon Marine Company, Inc of Hillside, New Jersey on 26 February 1999. The initial lease term was five years, but it was ultimately extended a further four years. The terms of the lease allowed the Navy to recall the ship if needed.

== Donjon Marine Company service (1999–2008) ==
The government of Turkey contracted with Donjon Marine to tow four decommissioned U.S. Navy ships from ports on the east coast of the United States to the Gölcük Naval Shipyard. In 1999, Powhatan was responsible for at least two of the tows, including that of ex-Miller.

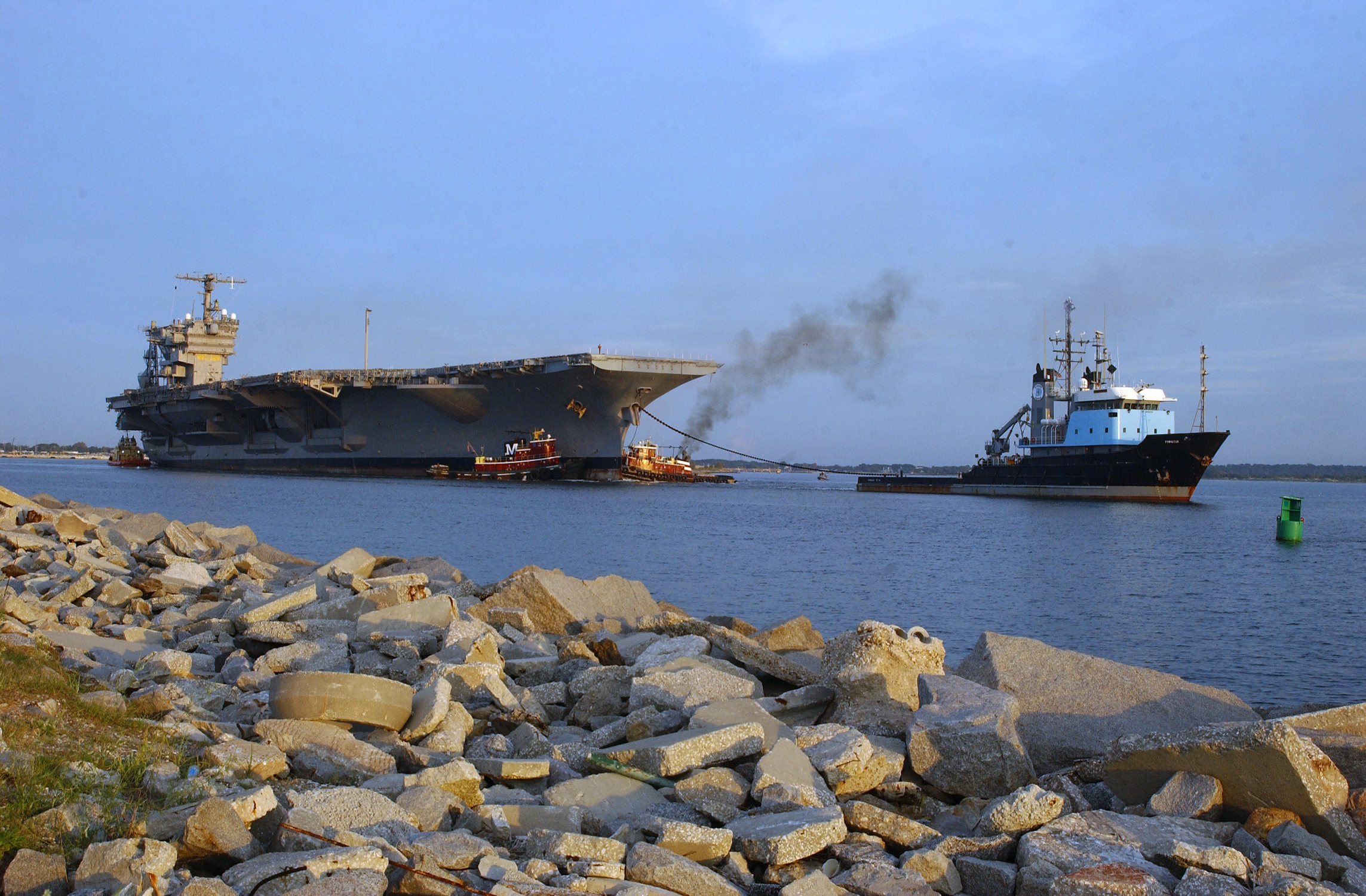
Powhatan, in Donjon Marine colors, tows ex-John F. Kennedy out of Mayport, Florida in 2007

In September 1999 the 750-foot-long container barge San Jaun Jax Bridge broke loose from her towboat during Hurricane Floyd. Powhatan sailed from Charleston, South Carolina and recovered the barge.

Powhatan participated in evacuation of stranded commuters from Manhattan in the immediate aftermath of the September 11, 2001 attacks.

The chemical tanker Bow Mariner exploded and sank off the Virginia coast in February 2004. Powhatan was chartered to assist in the clean-up efforts. A remotely-operated vehicle was embarked to examine the condition of the wreck.

In early 2005 Powhatan towed ex-America out to sea where she was sunk by a series of explosions intended to evaluate aircraft carrier vulnerabilities. Later in 2005, the tug was dispatched with a crane-barge to Louisiana as part of the recovery effort from Hurricane Katrina.

In 2007 she towed ex-John F. Kennedy from Mayport to Newport News, Virginia.

== Turkish Navy service (2008–present) ==
Upon completion of the lease, Powhatan was struck from the Naval Vessel Register on 25 February 2008 and sold to Turkey on 26 February 2008 through the Security Assistance Program. A ceremony commemorating the handover was held in Charleston. Due to her poor condition upon termination of the lease, she underwent a refit which included complete rebuilding of all engines and generators at Charleston. During the refit, the ex-Powhatan was commissioned into the Turkish Navy as TCG Inebolu (A-590).

Inebolu was involved in the search and rescue operations for the downed Turkish F-4 reconnaissance jet in the eastern Mediterranean Sea. The aircraft was shot down by Syrian Armed Forces in international airspace on 22 June 2012 killing two pilots. Inebolu joined the research vessel EV Nautilus, and was tasked with the salvage operation for the aircraft's wreckage from the 3,000 m (9,800 ft) deep seabed after the bodies of the pilots were brought up to the surface.

The ship participated in the 2017 NATO submarine rescue exercise "Dynamic Monarch", as part of a nine-nation fleet.

In 2020, damaged Bangladesh Navy corvette BNS Bijoy was towed by TCG İnebolu to Turkey for repairs in Aksaz Naval Base. BNS Bijoy was damaged during the 2020 Beirut explosion.

Inebolu participated in the multi-national naval exercise "Dogu Akdeniz-21" in November 2021.

== Awards and honors ==
Powhatan and her crew won a number of honors during her service with the U.S. Navy. These include:

Armed Forces Expeditionary Medal in 1995

Meritorious Unit Award in 1985

Navy "E" Ribbon in 1983, 1984
