= Strategic sealift ships =

United States military ship category

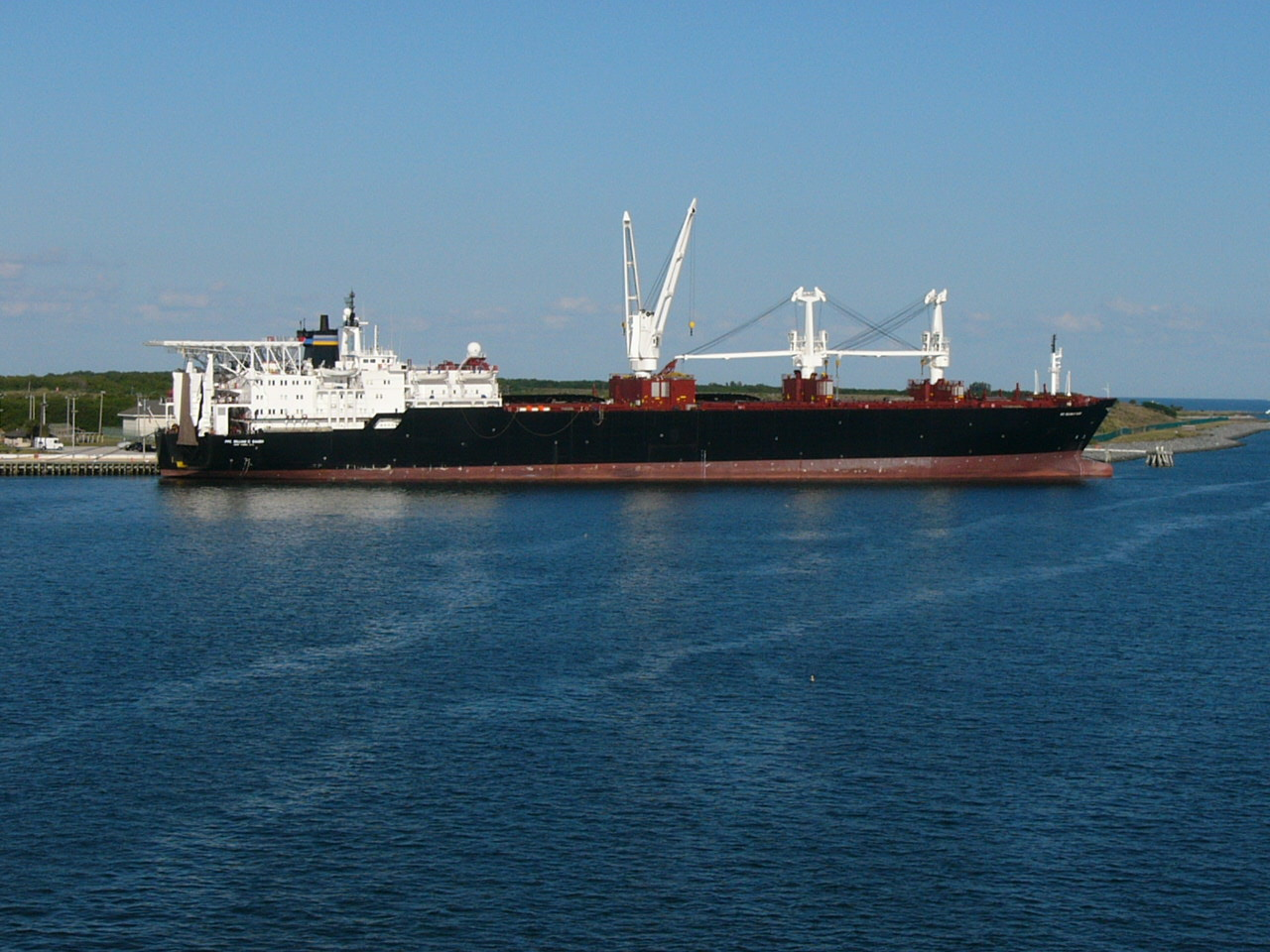
PFC William B. Baugh docked at Port Canaveral, Florida, in 2008

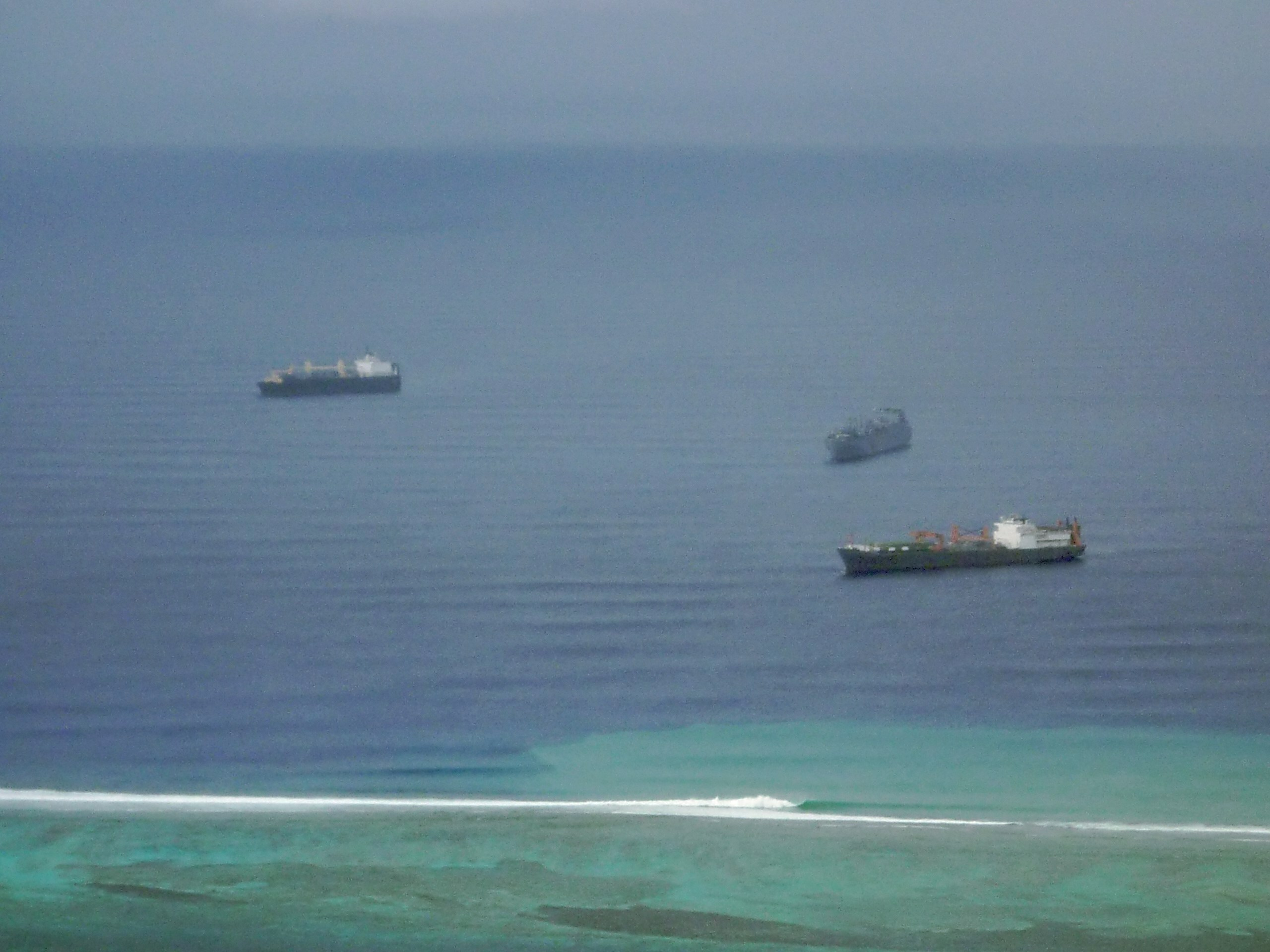
USNS PFC Dewayne T. Williams, USNS Dahl, and USNS Maj. Stephen W. Pless anchored off the coast of Saipan in June 2011

Strategic sealift ships or Maritime prepositioning ships are part of the United States Military Sealift Command's (MSC) prepositioning program. There are currently 17 ships in the program, strategically positioned around the world to support the Army, Navy, Air Force, Marine Corps and Defense Logistics Agency. Most are named after Medal of Honor recipients from the service they support. The ships are assigned to two Maritime Prepositioning Ship (MPS) squadrons located in the Indian Ocean at Diego Garcia and in the Western Pacific Ocean at Guam and Saipan.

The MPS ships in each squadron have sufficient equipment, supplies and ammunition to support a Marine Air-Ground Task Force for 30 days. The MPS ships are self-sustaining, with cranes to unload at sea or pierside. MSC chartered the first two ship classes in the MPS role (the Corporal Louis J. Hauge Jr. and Sergeant Matej Kocak classes) from civilian shipping lines and converted them. Later ships were purpose-built.

Afloat prepositioning by US military began in the early 1980s to improve the response time for the delivery of equipment and supplies to a potential theater of operation.

== Ships ==
=== Sergeant Matej Kocak class ===
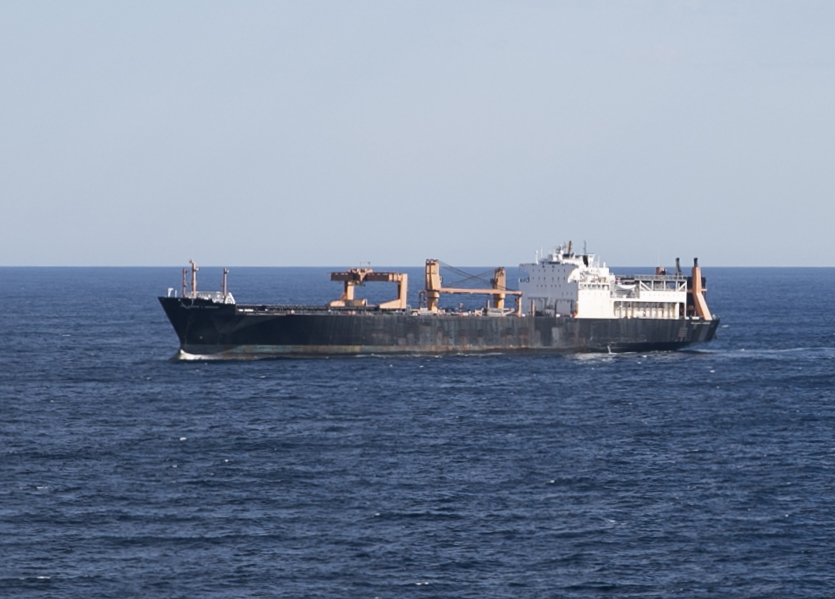
USNS PFC Eugene A. Obregon

The Sergeant Matej Kocak class, the second class of MPS ships chartered by MSC, also gained 157 feet (48 m) amidships and a helicopter deck after conversion. These ships, delivered to MSC in the mid-1980s, built at Sun Shipbuilding & Drydock Co., Chester, Pennsylvania, and converted at National Steel and Shipbuilding Company, San Diego. They were previously owned by Waterman Steamship Corporation but recently sold to MSC and now operated by Keystone Shipping Company. They were all part of the Waterman Line C7-S-133a Series.

- Builder: Sun Shipbuilding & Drydock Co., Chester, PA; General Dynamics Quincy Shipbuilding Division, Quincy, Massachusetts
- Converted: National Steel and Shipbuilding Company, San Diego, California
- Power Plant: 2 boilers; 2 GE turbines; 30,000 hp (22,371 kW); 1 shaft
- Length: 821.0 ft (250.2 m)
- Beam: 105.6 ft (32.2 m)
- Displacement: 48,754 tons (49,536 metric tons) full load
- Crew: 34 civilians, 10 technicians
- Cargo capacity: Containers, 532; ro-ro, 152,236 ft^{2} (14,143 m^{2}); JP-5 barrels, 20,290; DF-2 barrels, 12,355; Mogas barrels, 3,717; stable water, 2,189; cranes, two twin 50-ton and one 30-ton gantry
- Helicopters: platform only
- Speed: 20 knots (37 km/h)

Ships

  - USNS Sgt. Matej Kocak (T-AK-3005) (formerly SS Sgt. Matej Kocak, SS John B. Waterman)
  - USNS PFC Eugene A. Obregon (T-AK-3006) (formerly SS PFC Eugene A. Obregon, SS Thomas Heywood)
  - USNS Maj. Stephen W. Pless (T-AK-3007) (formerly SS Maj. Stephen W. Pless, SS Charles Carroll)

=== 2nd Lieutenant John P. Bobo class ===
The 2nd Lieutenant John P. Bobo-class ships are new-construction ships delivered to MSC in the mid-1980s from General Dynamics Quincy Shipbuilding Division, Quincy, Massachusetts. They were owned by American Overseas Marine but have been recently sold to MSC and are now operated by Crowley Technical Management.

- Builders: General Dynamics Quincy Shipbuilding Division, Quincy, Massachusetts
- Power Plant: 2 Stork-Werkspoor 16TM410 diesels; 27,000 hp (20,134 kW) sustained; 1 Omnithruster JT1000 bow thruster, 1,000 hp (746 kW)
- Length: 675.2 ft (205.8 m)
- Beam: 105.5 ft (32.2 m)
- Displacement: 44,330 tons (45,041 metric tons) full load
- Cargo capacity: Containers, 530; ro-ro, 152,185 ft^{2} (14,138 m^{2}); JP-5 barrels, 20,776; DF-2 barrels, 13,334; Mogas barrels, 4,880; stable water, 2,357; cranes, one single and two twin 39-ton
- Helicopters: platform only
- Speed: 17.7 knots (33 km/h)
- Crew: 38 civilians, 10 technicians
  - USNS 2nd Lt. John P. Bobo (T-AK-3008) (formerly MV 2nd Lt. John P. Bobo)
  - USNS PFC Dewayne T. Williams (T-AK-3009) (formerly MV PFC Dewayne T. Williams)
  - USNS 1st Lt. Baldomero Lopez (T-AK-3010) (formerly MV 1st Lt. Baldomero Lopez)
  - USNS 1st Lt. Jack Lummus (T-AK-3011) (formerly MV 1st Lt. Jack Lummus)
  - USNS Sgt. William R. Button (T-AK-3012) (formerly MV Sgt. William R. Button)

=== Capt Steven L. Bennett class ===
- Length: 687 ft 0 in (209.4 m)
- Beam: 100 ft 0 in (30.5 m)
- Draft: 38 ft 1 in (11.6 m)
- Displacement: 52,878 long tons (53,727 t)
- Speed: 18.3 knots (33.9 km/h)
- Civilian: 24 contract mariners
  - MV Capt. Steven L. Bennett (T-AK-4296)

=== Maj. Bernard F. Fisher class ===
- Length: 652 ft (199 m)
- Beam: 105 ft (32 m)
- Draft: 34 ft (10 m)
- Displacement: 48,000 long tons (48,770 t)
- Speed: 19 knots (35 km/h)
- Civilian: 24 contract mariners
  - MV Maj. Bernard F. Fisher (T-AK-4396)

=== 1st Lt. Harry L. Martin class ===
- Length: 754 ft 0 in (229.8 m)
- Beam: 105 ft 10 in (32.3 m)
- Draft: 35 ft 11 in (10.9 m)
- Displacement: 51,531 long tons (52,358 t)
- Speed: 17 knots (31 km/h)
- Civilian: 25 contract mariners
  - USNS 1st Lt. Harry L. Martin (T-AK-3015)

=== LCPL Roy M. Wheat class ===
- Length: 863 ft 2 in (263.1 m)
- Beam: 98 ft 5 in (30.0 m)
- Draft: 35 ft 0 in (10.7 m)
- Displacement: 50,570 long tons (51,381 t)
- Speed: 20.5 knots (38 km/h)
- Civilian: 29 contract mariners
  - USNS LCPL Roy M. Wheat (T-AK-3016)

=== LTC John U. D. Page class ===
- Length: 949.8 ft (289.5 m)
- Beam: 105.9 ft (32.3 m)
- Draft: 35.0 ft (10.7 m)
- Displacement: 74,500 long tons (75,695 t)
- Speed: 18 knots (33 km/h)
- Civilian: 20 contract mariners
  - MV LTC John U.D. Page (T-AK-4496)
  - MV SSG Edward A. Carter (T-AK-4544)

== High-speed vessels ==
=== HSV 2 class ===
- Length: 331 ft 4 in (101.0 m)
- Beam: 87 ft 5 in (26.6 m)
- Draft: 11 ft 0 in (3.4 m)
- Displacement: 1,463.6 short tons (1,328 t)
- Speed: 35 knots (65 km/h)
- Civilian: 17 contract mariners
- Military: as required by mission
  - HSV-2 Swift

== Large, medium-speed roll-on/roll-off ships ==
=== Watson class ===
The Watson class of LMSR built at National Steel and Shipbuilding Company in San Diego

- Length: 950 ft (290 m)
- Beam: 106 ft (32 m)
- Draft: 34 ft (10 m)
- Displacement: 62,644 long tons (63,649 t)
- Power Plant: 2 GE Marine LM 2500 gas turbines; 64,000 hp (47,725 kW); 2 shafts, cp props
- Speed: 24 knots (44 km/h)
- Civilian: 30 contract mariners
- Military: 5

Ships

  - USNS Watson (T-AKR-310)
  - USNS Sisler (T-AKR-311)
  - USNS Dahl (T-AKR-312)
  - USNS Red Cloud (T-AKR-313)
  - USNS Charlton (T-AKR-314)
  - USNS Watkins (T-AKR-315)
  - USNS Pomeroy (T-AKR-316)
  - USNS Soderman (T-AKR-317)

== Tankers ==
- Length: 615 ft (187 m)
- Beam: 90 ft (27 m)
- Draft: 36 ft (11 m)
- Displacement: 39,624 long tons (40,260 t)
- Speed: 16.0 knots (30 km/h)
- Civilian: 24 contract mariners
  - USNS Lawrence H. Gianella (T-AOT-1125)

== Offshore petroleum distribution system ==
- Length: 348.5 ft (106.2 m)
- Beam: 70 ft (21.3 m)
- Draft: 26.0 ft (7.9 m)
- Displacement:
- Speed: 15 knots (28 km/h)
- Civilian: 26 contract mariners
  - USNS VADM K.R. Wheeler (T-AG-5001)

== Activated Ready Reserve Force ships ==
The following are part of the National Defense Reserve Fleet but have been activated and are pre-positioned.

=== Modular cargo delivery system ship ===
- Length: 565 ft (172 m)
- Beam: 76 ft (23 m)
- Draft: 31 ft (9 m)
- Displacement: 22,929 long tons (23,297 t)
- Speed: 17.0 knots (31 km/h)
- Civilian: 38 contract mariners
  - SS Cape Jacob (T-AK 5029)

=== Wright class ===
Dedicated to USMC aviation logistics support

- Length: 602 ft 0 in (183 m)
- Beam: 90 ft 2 in (27 m)
- Draft: 32 ft 10 in (10 m)
- Displacement: 23,800 long tons (24,182 t)
- Speed: 19 knots (35 km/h)
- Civilian: 41 contract mariners

Ships

  - SS Wright (T-AVB-3)
  - SS Curtiss (T-AVB-4)

== Former ships ==
=== Buffalo Soldier class ===
- Length: 670 ft 0 in (204.2 m)
- Beam: 87 ft 0 in (26.5 m)
- Draft: 34 ft 6 in (10.5 m)
- Displacement: 26,378 long tons (26,801 t)
- Speed: 16 knots (30 km/h)
- Civilian: 21 contract mariners

Ships

  - MV Buffalo Soldier (T-AK-9301)
  - MV TSgt John A. Chapman (T-AK 323)

=== Corporal Louis J. Hauge Jr. class ===
Named for Medal of Honor recipient Louis J. Hauge Jr. USMC, the Corporal Louis J. Hauge Jr. class is the original class of MPS ships chartered by Military Sealift Command. The five ships are Maersk Line ships converted by Bethlehem Steel. During conversion, the ships gained an additional 157 feet (48 m) amidships and a helicopter landing pad, among other things. They have since been returned to Maersk for commercial use and are no longer part of the MPS program.

- Builder: Odense Staalskibsvaerft A/S, Lindo
- Power Plant: 1 Sulzer 7RND76M diesel; 16,800 hp (12,528 kW); 1 shaft; bow thruster
- Length: 755 ft (230 m)
- Beam: 90 ft (27 m)
- Displacement: 46,552 long tons (47,299 t) full load
- Speed: 17.5 knots (32 km/h)

Ships

  - MV Cpl. Louis J. Hauge Jr. (T-AK 3000) (formerly MV Estelle Maersk)
  - MV PFC William B. Baugh (T-AK-3001) (formerly MV Eleo Maersk)
  - MV PFC James Anderson Jr. (T-AK 3002) (formerly MV Emma Maersk)
  - MV 1st Lt. Alex Bonnyman (T-AK-3003) (formerly MV Emilie Maersk)
  - MV Pvt. Franklin J. Phillips (T-AK-3004) (formerly Pvt. Harry Fisher, MV Evelyn Maersk)
- Crew: 32 civilians, 10 technicians

== See also ==
- MV Virginian (T-AK 9205)
- Robert McNamara as Secretary of Defense § Sealift and amphibious warfare
