= Large, Medium-Speed Roll-on/Roll-off =

Classification of US military cargo ships

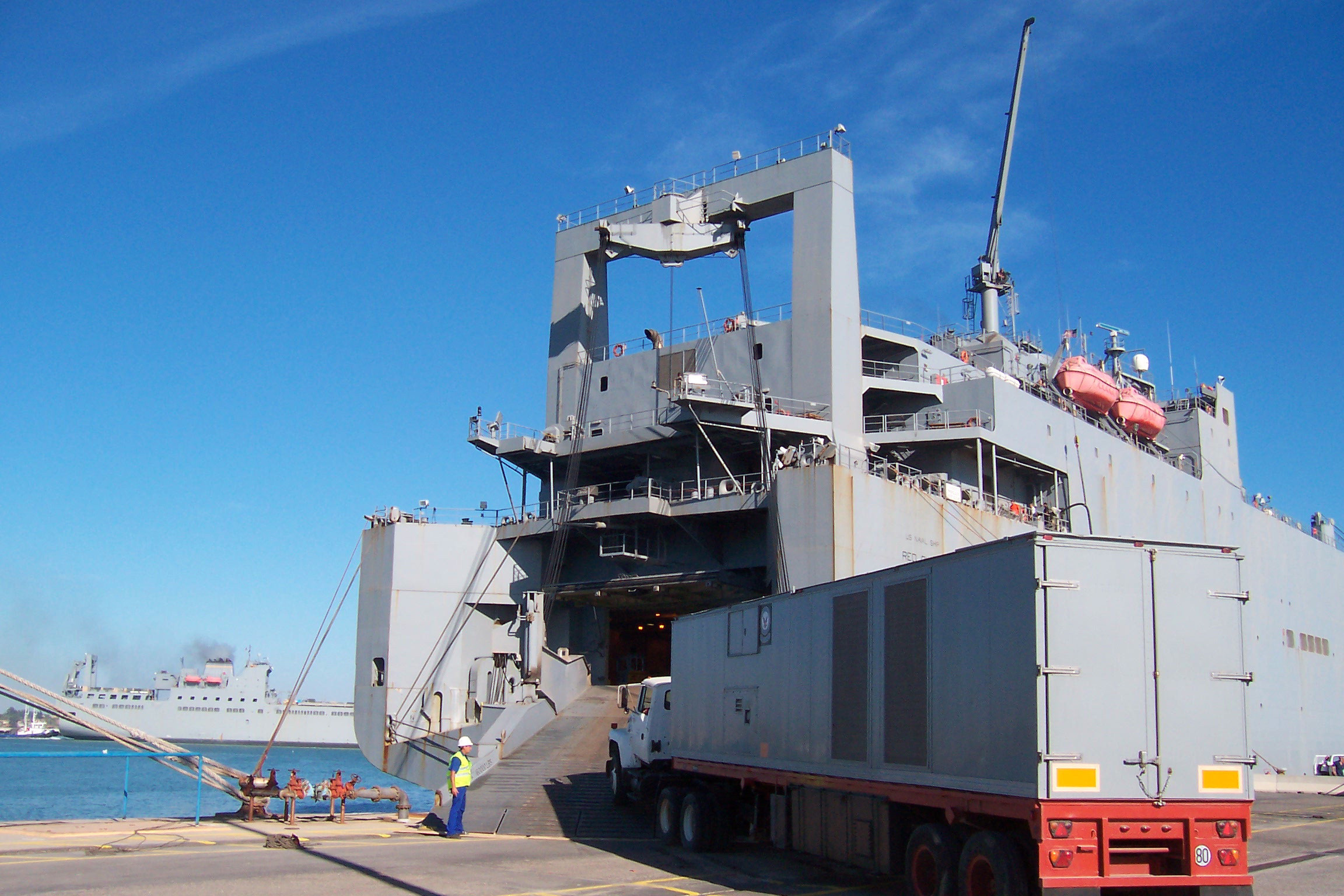
A diesel generator is loaded aboard the Military Sealift Command (MSC) large, medium-speed, roll-on-roll-off ship USNS Red Cloud (T-AKR 313) in Rota, Spain

Large, Medium-Speed Roll-on/Roll-off (LMSR) refers to several classes of the United States' Military Sealift Command (MSC) roll-on/roll-off type cargo ships. Some are purpose-built for military cargo, while others were converted.

== Bob Hope class ==
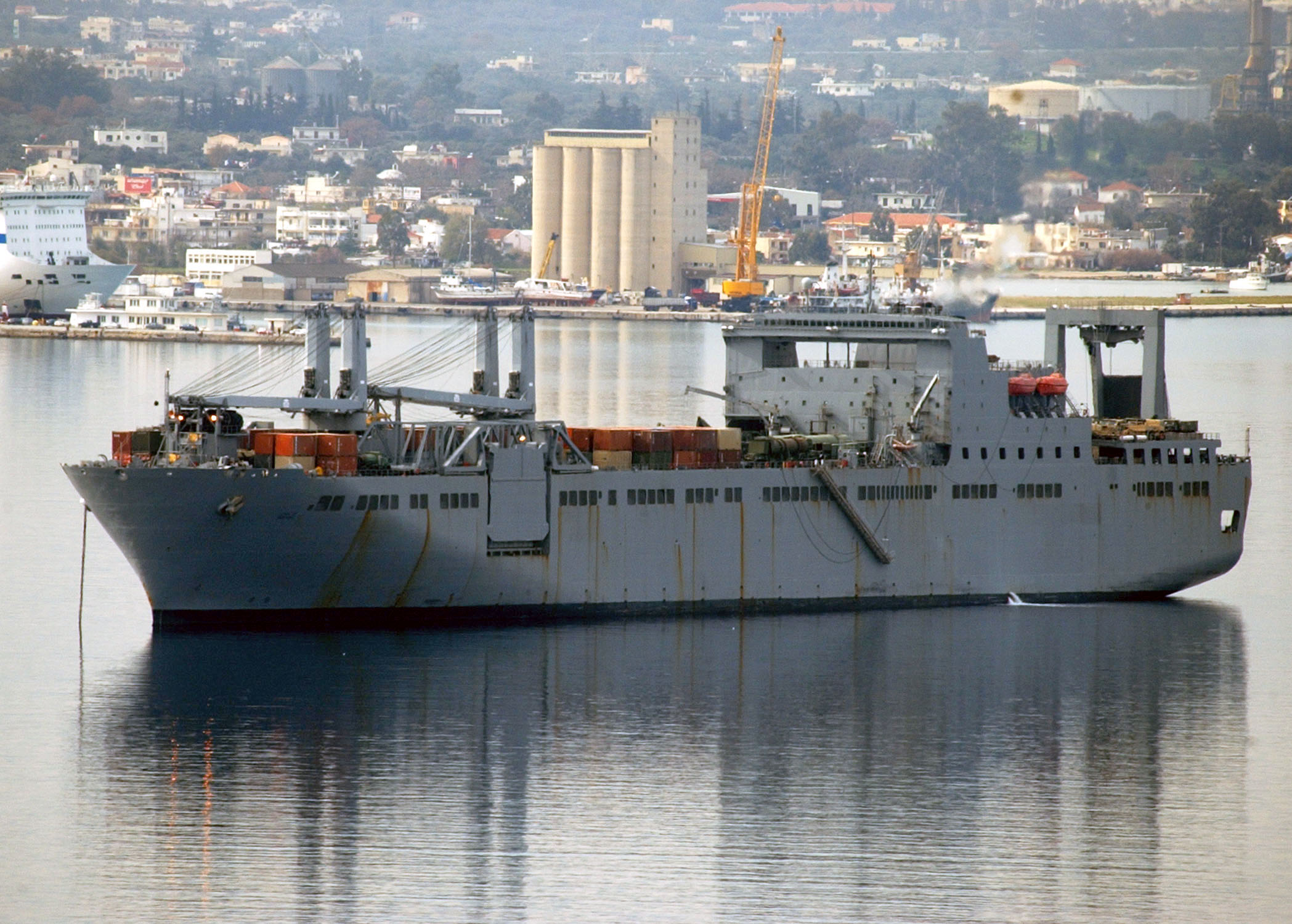
USNS Bob Hope at anchorage in Souda harbor

The Bob Hope class are a group of seven diesel-powered vessels built at Avondale Shipyard in Louisiana between 1993 and 2001 for MSC. They are 951 ft 5 in (289.99 m) long and 106 ft (32 m) wide.

- USNS Bob Hope (T-AKR-300)
- USNS Fisher (T-AKR-301)
- USNS Seay (T-AKR-302)
- USNS Mendonca (T-AKR-303)
- USNS Pililaau (T-AKR-304)
- USNS Brittin (T-AKR-305)
- USNS Benavidez (T-AKR-306)

== Watson class ==
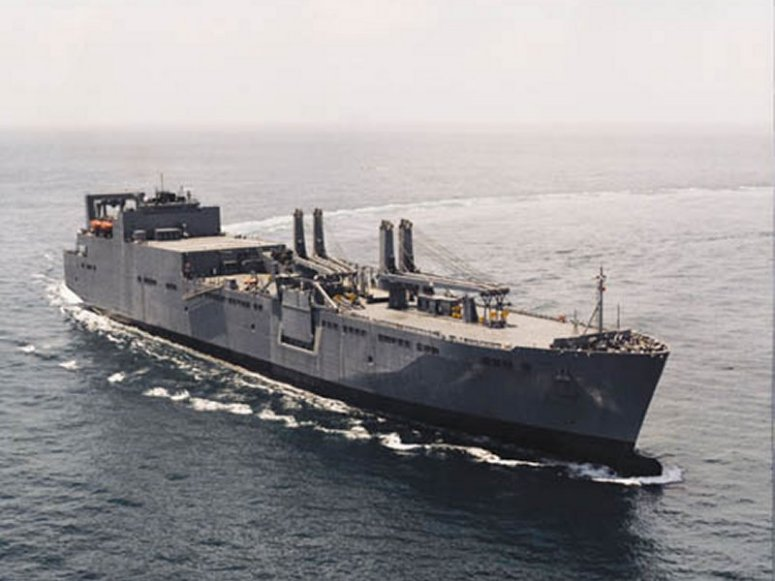
USNS Watson at sea

The Watson class are a group of eight gas-turbine-powered vessels built at National Steel and Shipbuilding Company (NASSCO) in San Diego, California between 1996 and 2002 for MSC. They are 951.4 ft (290.0 m) long and 106 ft (32 m) wide.

- USNS Watson (T-AKR-310)
- USNS Sisler (T-AKR-311)
- USNS Dahl (T-AKR-312)
- USNS Red Cloud (T-AKR-313)
- USNS Charlton (T-AKR-314)
- USNS Watkins (T-AKR-315)
- USNS Pomeroy (T-AKR-316)
- USNS Soderman (T-AKR-317)

== Gordon class ==
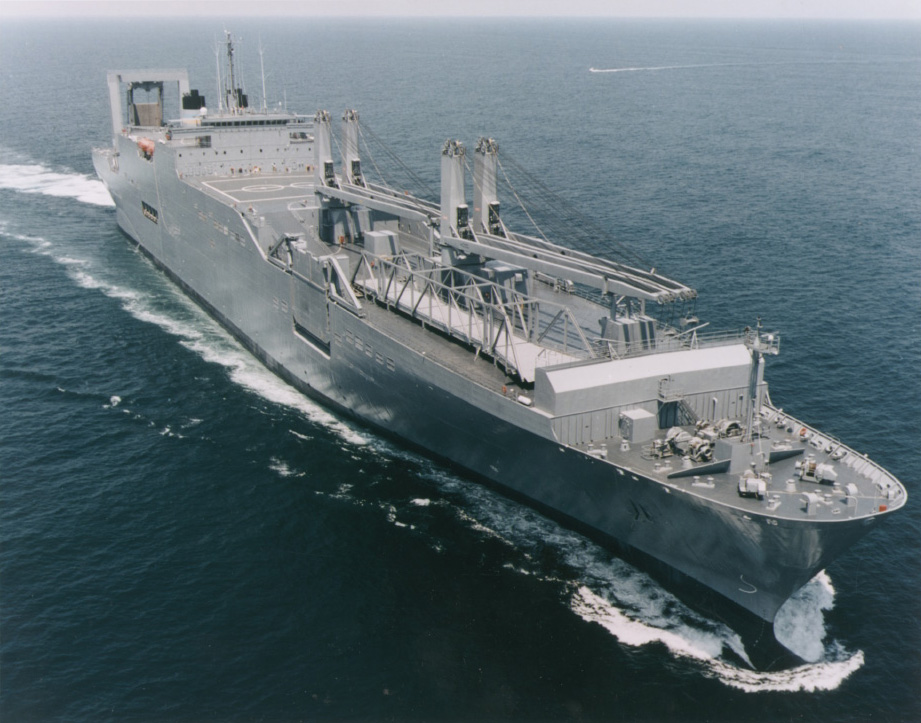
USNS Gordon at sea

The Gordon class are group of two LMSRs. Gordon was built in Denmark in 1972 as MV Jutlandia, and entered commercial service on 1 June 1973. After some time spent in commercial service she was lengthened by Hyundai Heavy Industries in 1984, and later went on to be acquired by the US Navy under a long term charter. She was converted for the Navy at Newport News Shipbuilding and Drydock Company and on delivery to the Navy was assigned to the Military Sealift Command on 23 August 1996 under the name USNS Gordon. They are diesel-powered, 954 ft (291 m) long and 105 ft 9 in (32.23 m) wide ships.

- USNS Gordon (T-AKR-296)
- USNS Gilliland (T-AKR-298)

== Shughart class ==
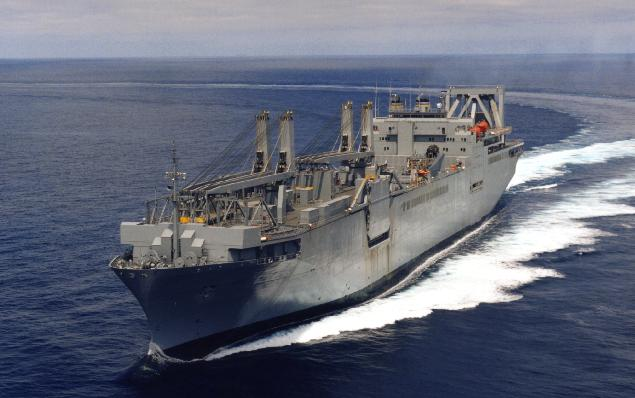
USNS Shughart at sea

The Shughart class are group of three LMSRs. Shughart was built as Laura Maersk in 1980 in Denmark by Lindovaerftet for A. P. Moller-Maersk Group. She was lengthened in 1987 and again in the early 1990s by Hyundai. On May 7, 1996 Laura Maersk was delivered to Military Sealift Command and was outfitted at NASSCO. They are diesel-powered, 908.8 ft (277.0 m) long and 105.6 ft (32.2 m) wide ships.

- USNS Shughart (T-AKR-295)
- USNS Yano (T-AKR-297)
- USNS GySgt. Fred W. Stockham (T-AK-3017) (ex-USNS Soderman (T-AKR-299))

== See also ==
- List of auxiliaries of the United States Navy § Vehicle cargo ships (T-AKR)
