= USNS Soderman =

USNS Soderman may refer to:

- USNS Soderman (T-AKR-299) is a cargo ship acquired by the US Navy in 1997 and renamed Soderman (T-AKR-299). She was again renamed GYSGT Fred W. Stockham (T-AK-3017) in 2001 and is currently in service.
- USNS Soderman (T-AKR-317) is a Watson-class vehicle cargo ship, launched in 2002 and in active service
