= LMSR =

LMSR may refer to:

- London, Midland and Scottish Railway, a British railway company 1923–1947
- Large, Medium-Speed Roll-on/Roll-off, several classes of U.S. Navy cargo ships
