= USNS Red Cloud =

Cargo ship of the United States Navy

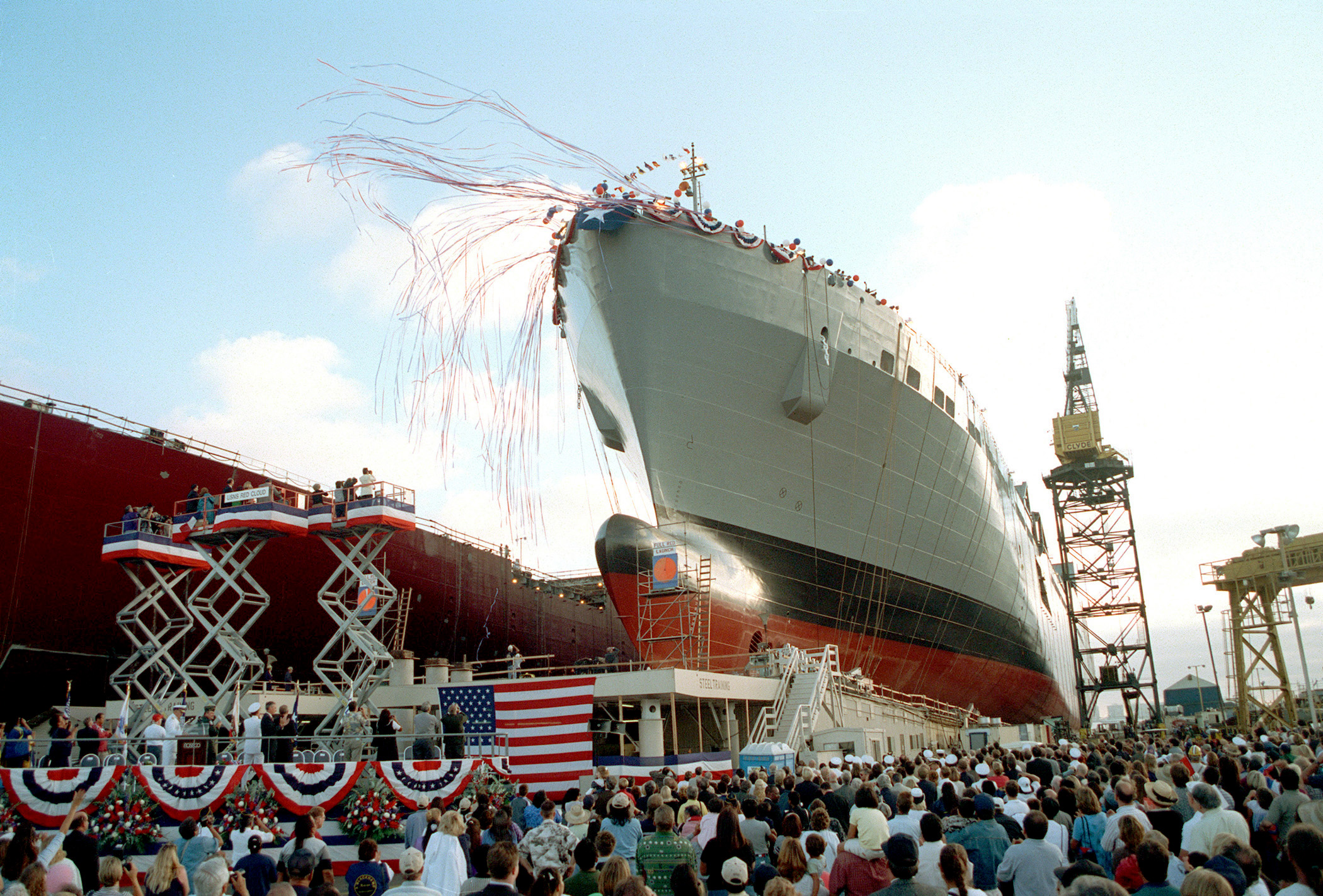

History

United States
- Awarded: 1 January 1996
- Builder: National Steel and Shipbuilding Company
- Laid down: 29 June 1998
- Launched: 7 August 1999
- In service: 18 January 2000
- Identification: IMO number: 9145449; MMSI number: 338931000; Callsign: NEHM
- Status: in service

General characteristics
- Class & type: Watson-class vehicle cargo ship
- Displacement: 62,644 Long Tons
- Length: 950 Ft
- Beam: 106 Ft
- Draft: 34 Ft
- Propulsion: 2 Gas Turbines
- Speed: 24 Knots
- Range: 12,000 Nautical Miles
- Complement: 30

USNS Red Cloud (T-AKR 313) is one of Military Sealift Command's nineteen Large, Medium-Speed Roll-on/Roll-off (LMSR) Ships and is one of the 49 ships in the prepositioning program. She is a Watson-class vehicle cargo ship named for Corporal Mitchell Red Cloud, Jr., a Medal of Honor recipient, after whom Camp Red Cloud in Korea is also named.

Laid down on 29 June 1998 and launched on 7 August 1999, Red Cloud was put into service on 18 January 2000.

In 2003 Red Cloud was deployed to transport U.S. Army vehicles to Kuwait to support Operation Iraqi Freedom.

On 12 August 2015, an Army UH-60 Black Hawk helicopter crashed on the deck of the Red Cloud when demonstrating capabilities to the Japan Ground Self-Defense Force. The Red Cloud was operating approximately eight miles east of Ukibaru Island. Of the seventeen service members on board the helicopter, seven suffered non-life-threatening injuries.

The Navy announced it would transfer the USNS Red Cloud on 30 September 2026 to the US Maritime Administration.

== Gallery ==
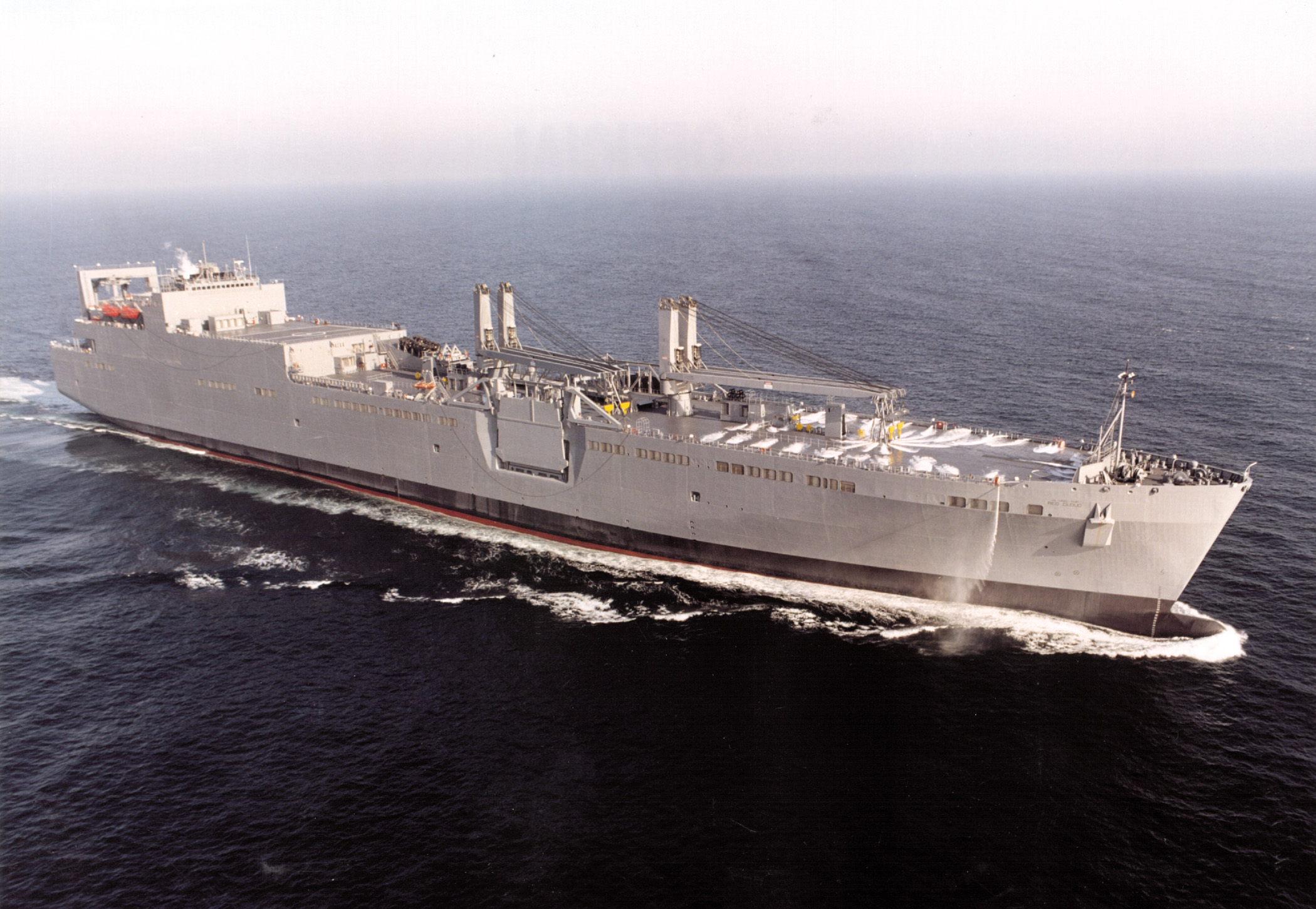
USNS Red Cloud
