= USNS 1st Lt. Baldomero Lopez =

2nd Lt. John P. Bobo-class dry cargo ship

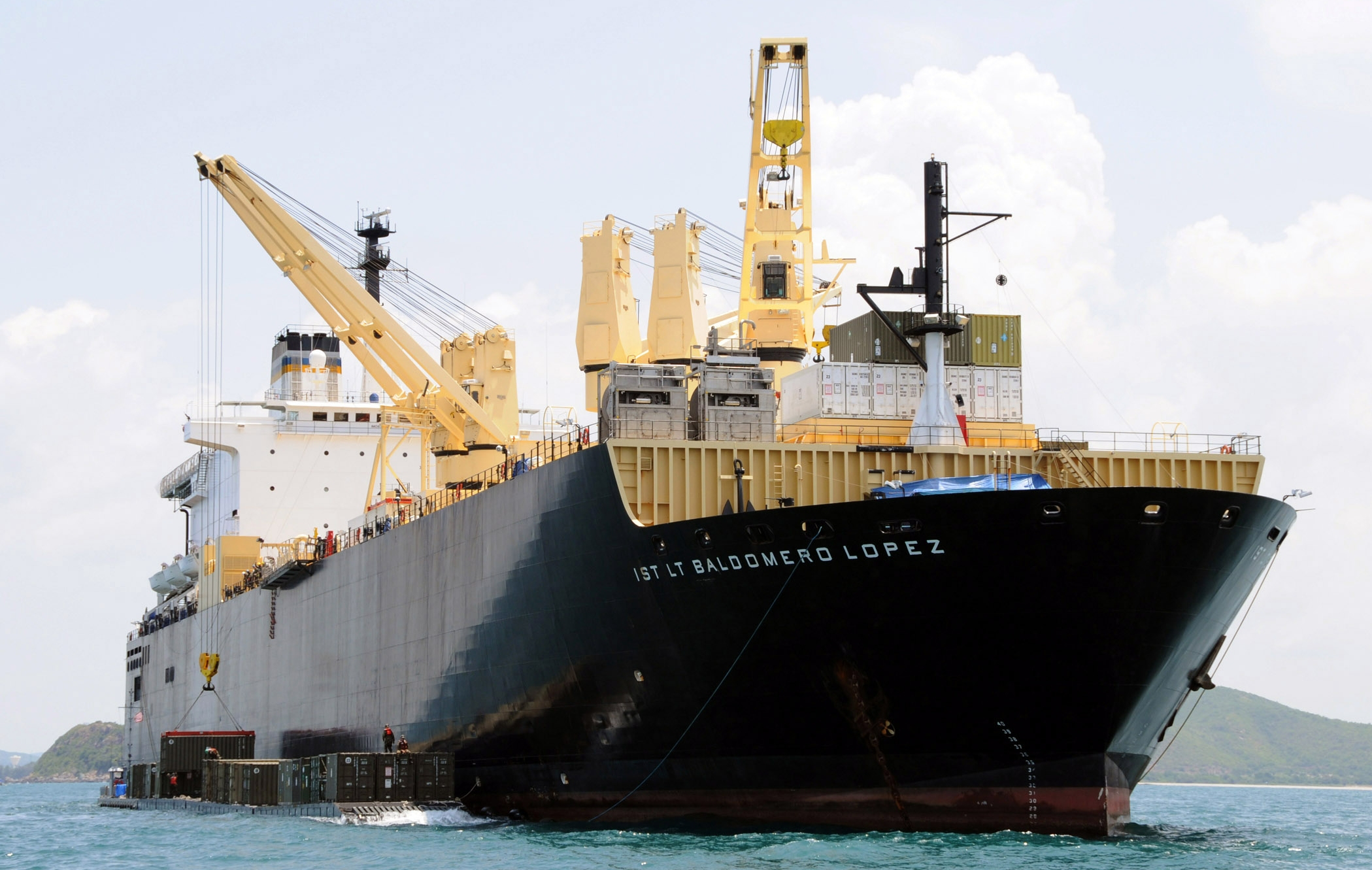
- USNS 1st Lt. Baldomero Lopez

History

United States
- Name: 1st Lt. Baldomero Lopez
- Namesake: Baldomero López
- Owner: American Overseas Marine (1985–2006); Military Sealift Command (2006–present)
- Builder: Fore River Shipyard
- Laid down: March 1984
- Launched: October 1985
- Acquired: 20 November 1985
- Reclassified: from AK-3010, 2006
- Home port: Diego Garcia
- Identification: IMO number: 8302442; MMSI number: 367348000; Callsign: NHNT; Hull number: T-AK-3010
- Honours and awards: See Awards
- Status: Active

General characteristics
- Class & type: 2nd Lt. John P. Bobo-class dry cargo ship
- Displacement: 44,330 t (43,630 long tons), full
- Length: 672 ft 6 in (204.98 m)
- Beam: 106 ft 0 in (32.31 m)
- Draft: 29 ft 5 in (8.97 m)
- Installed power: 1 × shaft; 27,000 hp (20,000 kW)
- Propulsion: 2 × Werkspoor 16TM410 diesel engines
- Speed: 18 knots (33 km/h; 21 mph)
- Capacity: 162,500 sq. ft. vehicle; 1,605,000 gallons petroleum; 81,700 gallons water; 522 TEU
- Complement: 55 mariners
- Aircraft carried: 1 × Sikorsky CH-53E
- Aviation facilities: Helipad

USNS 1st Lt. Baldomero Lopez (T-AK-3010) / (AK-3010) is the third ship of the 2nd Lt. John P. Bobo-class cargo ship built in 1985. The ship is named after First lieutenant Baldomero López, a US Marine who was awarded the Medal of Honor during the Korean War.

== Construction and commissioning ==
The ship was laid down in March 1984 and launched in October 1985 at the Fore River Shipyard, Quincy, Massachusetts. Later acquired on 20 November 1985 by the Maritime Administration for operation by American Overseas Marine.

From 3 until 13 October 2004, Baldomero Lopez, USNS Sgt. William R. Button (AK-3012) and USNS Charlton (T-AKR-314) transported into the Port of Philadelphia 400,000 square feet of combat gear for U.S. forces deployed in Operation Iraqi Freedom. On 17 January 2006, the ship was purchased by the Military Sealift Command and put into the Prepositioning Program with Maritime Prepositioning Ship Squadron 2. The ship operates in the Far East and Indian Ocean.

During Exercise Trident Juncture 2018, she unloaded, inspected and transported supplies to designated areas on 12 October 2018.

Baldomero Lopez carried and unloaded equipments and supplies as part of Maritime Prepositioning Force Exercise (MPFEX) 2020 while off the coast of Florida at Naval Station Mayport, on 14 February 2020.

== Awards ==
- National Defense Service Medal

== Gallery ==
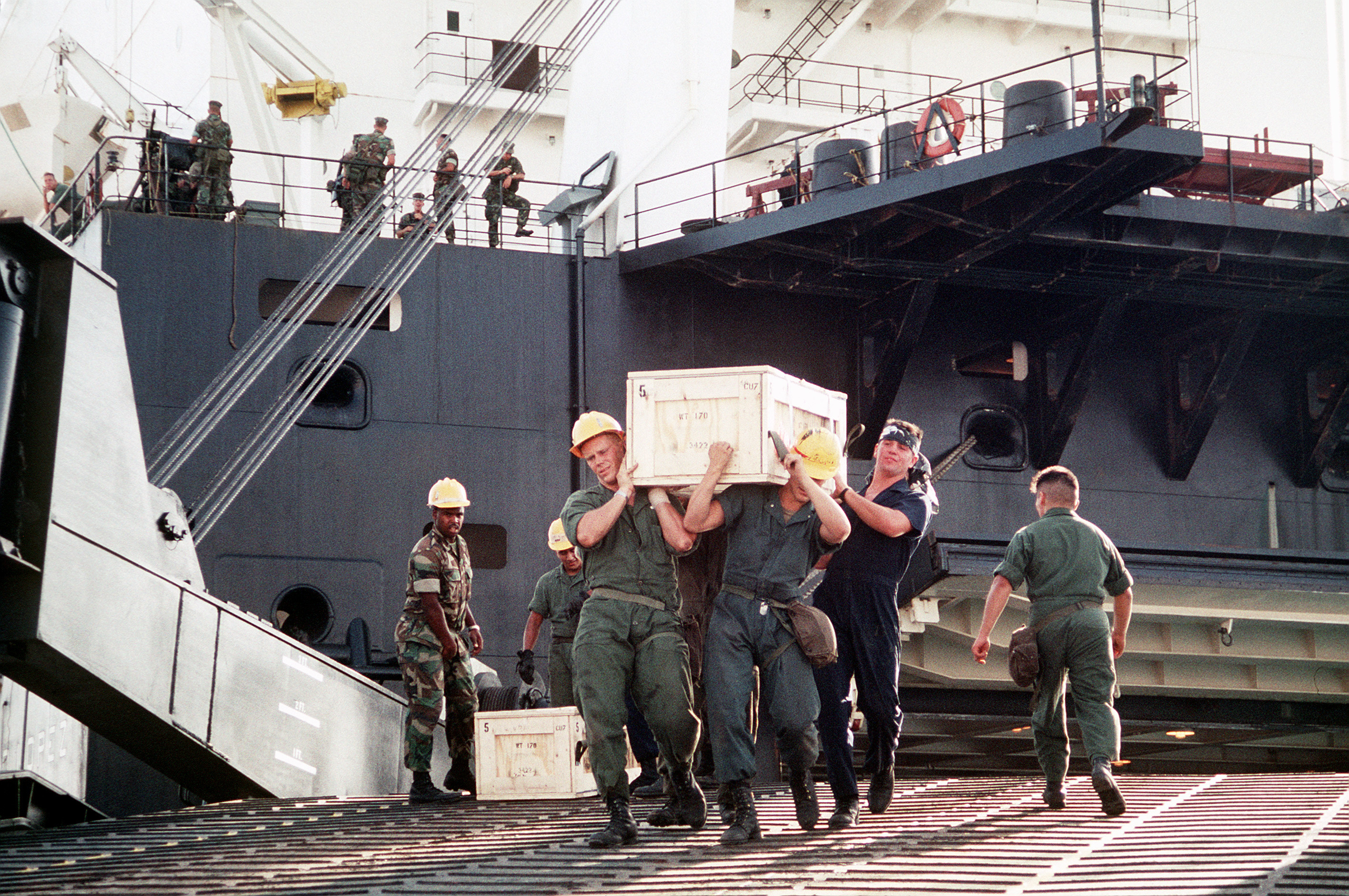
Seabees unloading crates from 1st Lt. Baldomero Lopez during Operation Desert Storm on 1 August 1990

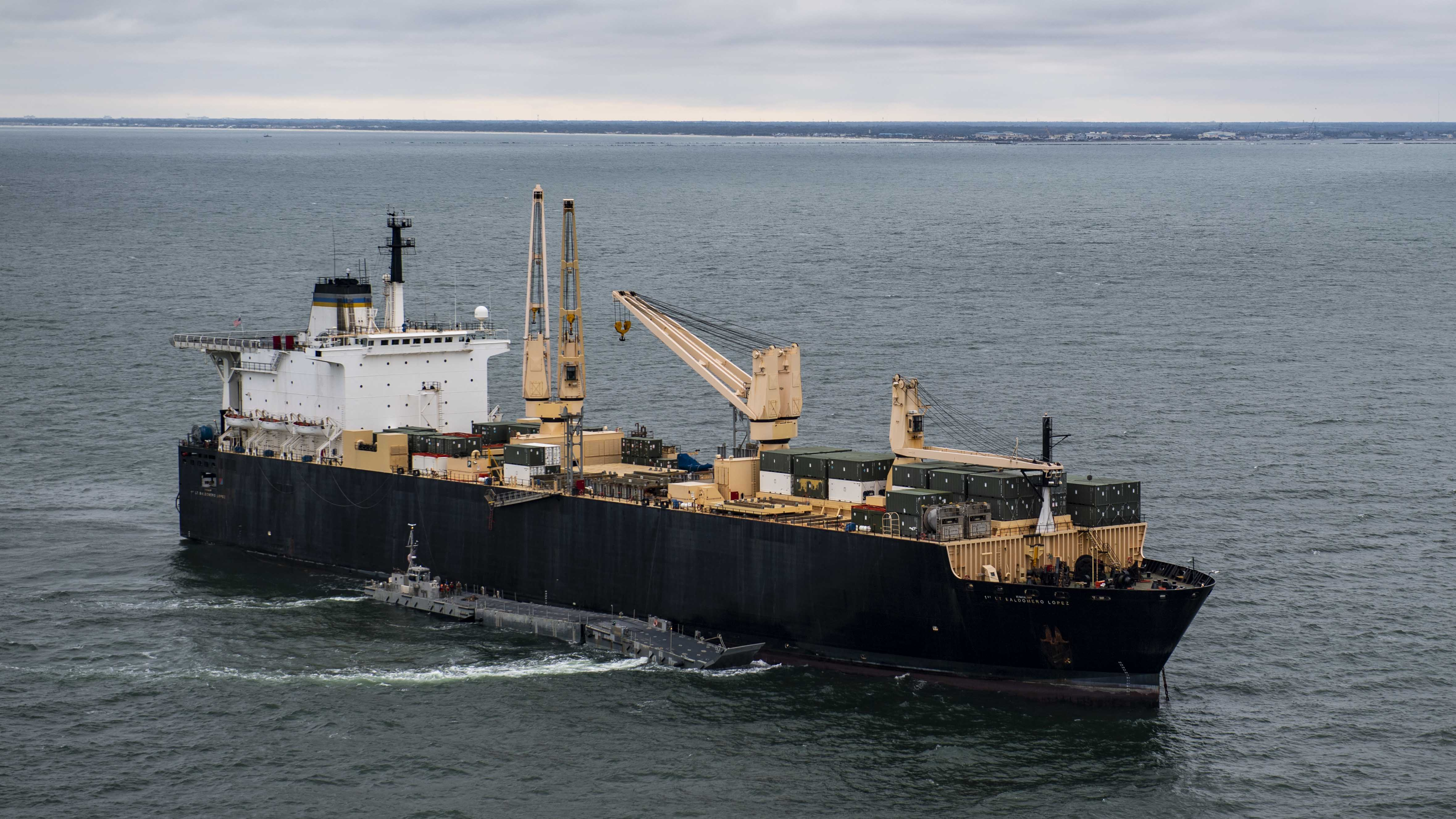
Starboard view of 1st Lt. Baldomero Lopez on 14 February 2020

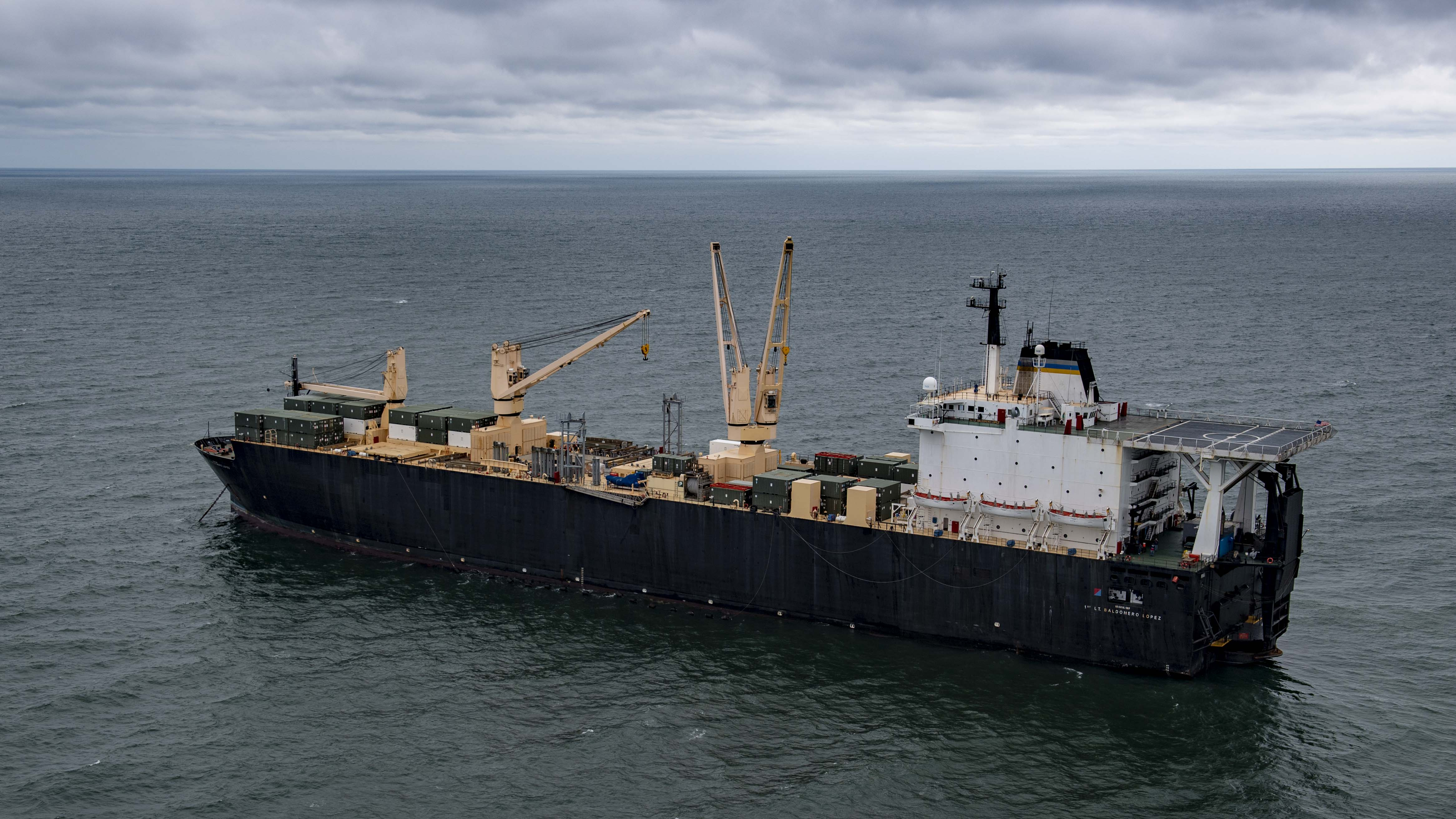
Port side view of 1st Lt. Baldomero Lopez on 14 February 2020

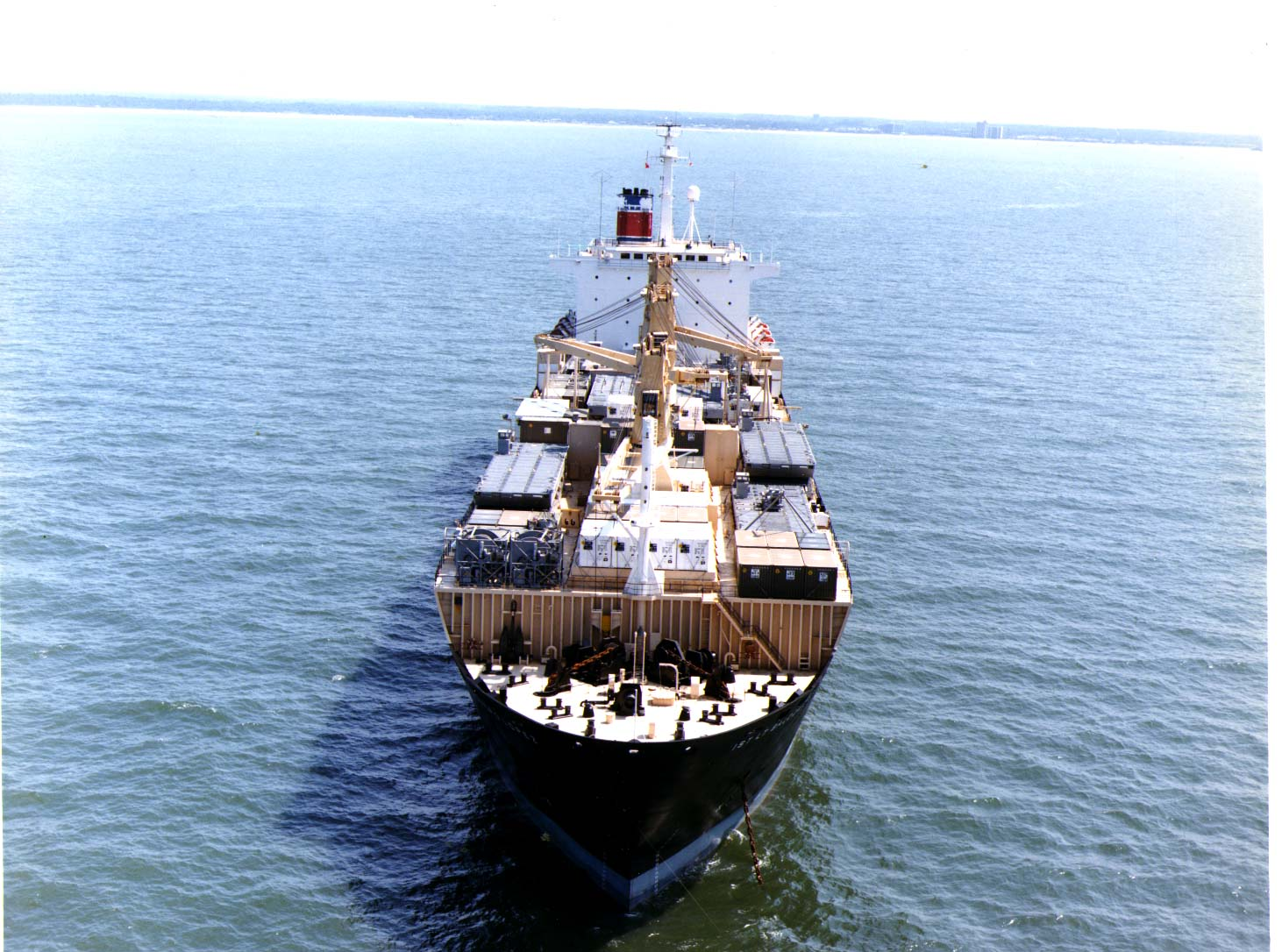
View of 1st Lt. Baldomero Lopez from the bow
