= USNS Pomeroy =

Cargo ship of the United States Navy

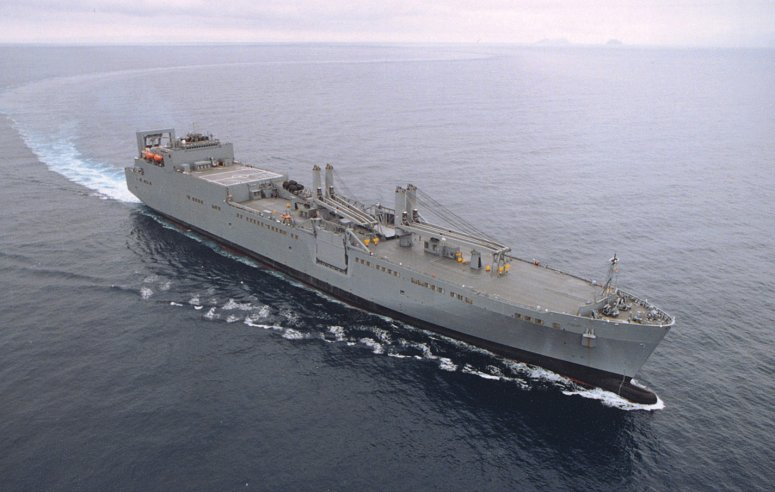

History

United States
- Ordered: 14 January 1997
- Builder: National Steel and Shipbuilding Company
- Laid down: 25 April 2000
- Launched: 10 March 2001
- In service: 14 August 2001
- Out of service: 1 April 2026
- Identification: IMO number: 9232242; MMSI number: 303845000; Callsign: NHRD
- Status: Out of service, in reserve

General characteristics
- Class & type: Watson-class vehicle cargo ship
- Displacement: 29,000 tons
- Length: 950 ft
- Beam: 106 ft
- Draft: 34 ft
- Propulsion: Gas turbine

USNS Pomeroy (T-AKR-316) is one of Military Sealift Command's nineteen Large, Medium-Speed Roll-on/Roll-off Ships and is part of the 33 ships in the Prepositioning Program. She is a Watson-class vehicle cargo ship named for Private First Class Ralph E. Pomeroy, a Medal of Honor recipient.

Laid down on 25 April 2000 and launched on 10 March 2001, Pomeroy was put into service in the Pacific Ocean on 14 August 2001.

According to The Guardian the human rights group Reprieve identified the Pomeroy and sixteen other USN vessels as having held "ghost prisoners" in clandestine extrajudicial detention.

The Navy announced it would transfer the USNS Pomeroy on 1 April 2026 to the US Maritime Administration.
