= MV 1st Lt. Alex Bonnyman =

Cpl. Louis J. Hauge Jr.-class dry cargo ship

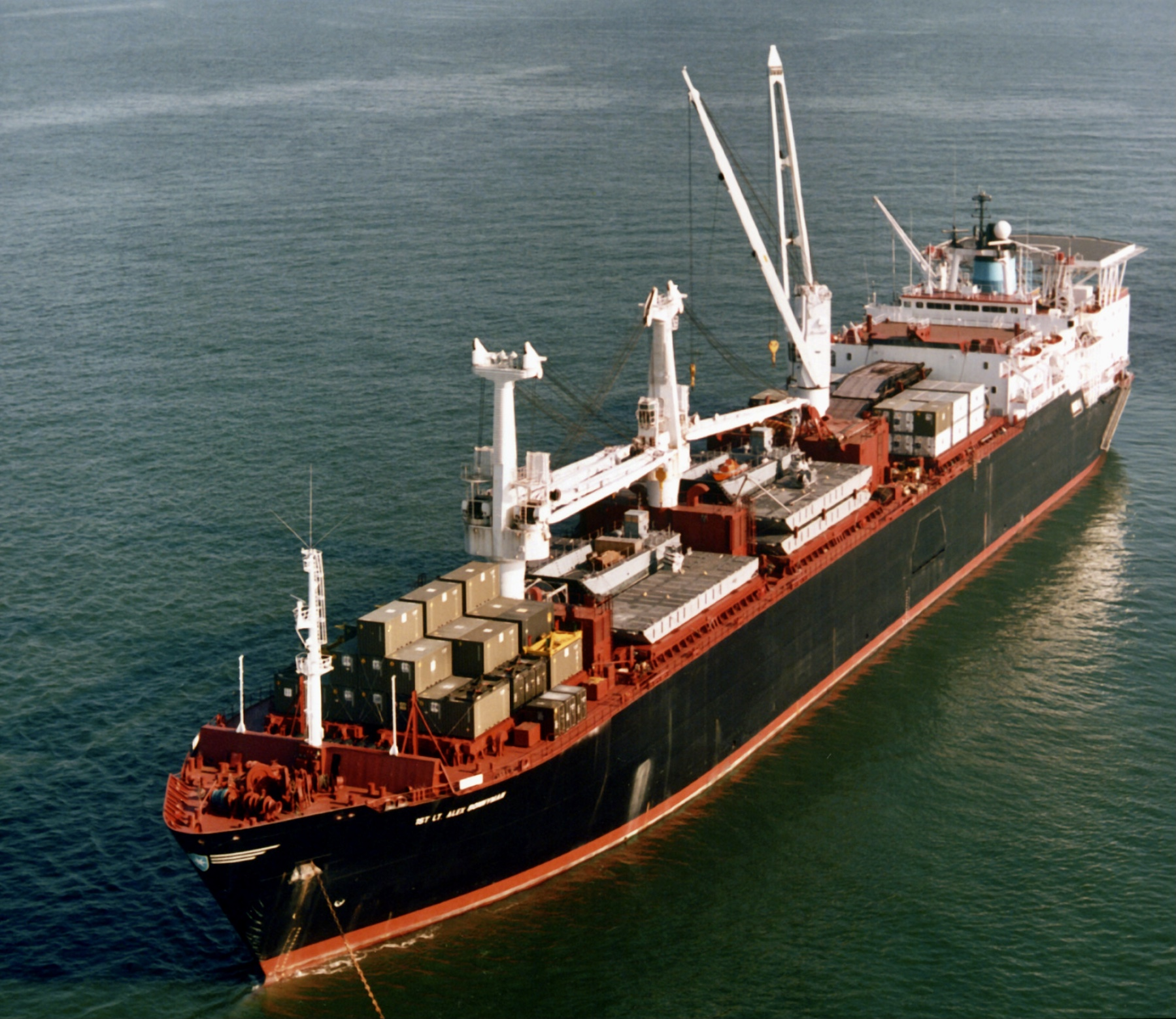
- MV PFC James Anderson Jr.

History

United States
- Name: 1st Lt. Alex Bonnyman
- Namesake: Alexander Bonnyman Jr.
- Owner: Maersk Line
- Builder: Odense Staalskibsvaerft A/S
- Launched: 3 August 1979
- Completed: 1980
- Acquired: January 1980
- Renamed: Emilie Mærsk (1980–1985)
- Stricken: 2009
- Identification: Hull number: AK-3003
- Honours and awards: See Awards
- Fate: Scrapped, 2009

General characteristics
- Class & type: Cpl. Louis J. Hauge Jr.-class cargo ship
- Displacement: 23,365 t (22,996 long tons), light; 46,484 t (45,750 long tons), full
- Length: 755 ft 5 in (230.25 m)
- Beam: 90 ft 0 in (27.43 m)
- Draft: 33 ft 10 in (10.31 m)
- Installed power: 1 × shaft; 16,800 hp (12,500 kW)
- Propulsion: 2 × Sulzer 7RND76M diesel engines; 2 × boilers
- Speed: 16.4 knots (30.4 km/h; 18.9 mph)
- Capacity: 120,080 sq. ft. vehicle; 1,283,000 gallons petroleum; 65,000 gallons water; 332 TEU
- Complement: 25 mariners and 11 technicians
- Aviation facilities: Helipad

MV 1st Lt. Alex Bonnyman (AK-3003), (former MV Emilie Mærsk), was the fourth ship of the Cpl. Louis J. Hauge Jr.-class cargo ship built in 1980. The ship is named after First Lieutenant Alexander Bonnyman Jr., an American Marine who was awarded the Medal of Honor during World War II.

== Construction and commissioning ==
The ship was built in 1980 at the Odense Staalskibsvaerft A/S, Lindø, Denmark. She was put into the service of Maersk Line as Emilie Mærsk.

In 1984, she was acquired and chartered by the Navy under a long-term contract as MV 1st Lt. Alex Bonnyman (AK-3003). The ship underwent conversion at the Bethlehem Steel at Sparrows Point, Massachusetts. She was assigned to Maritime Prepositioning Ship Squadron 3 and supported the US Marine Corps Expeditionary Brigade.

In 2009, the ship was struck from the Naval Register and later in August she was sold for scrap.

== Awards ==
- National Defense Service Medal
