= MV George Watson =

Cargo ship of the United States Navy

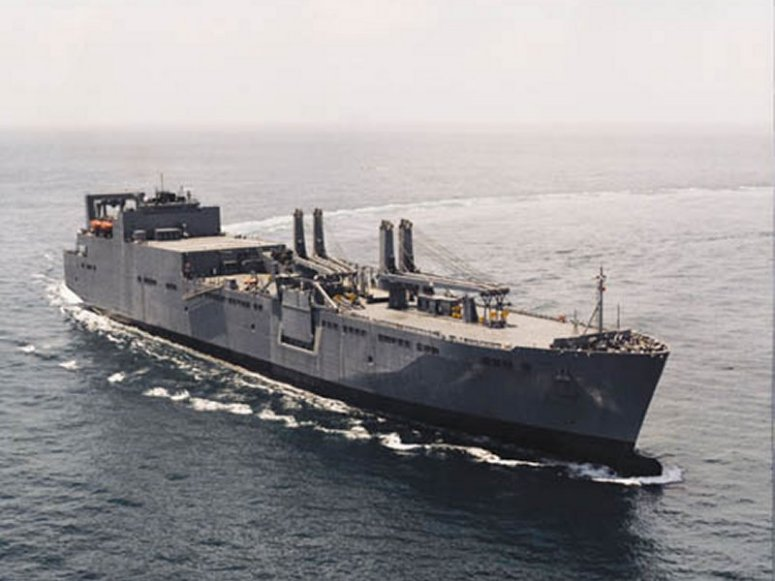

History

United States
- Name: USNS Watson
- Namesake: George Watson (Medal of Honor) (1914–1943)
- Ordered: 15 September 1993
- Builder: National Steel and Shipbuilding Company
- Laid down: 23 May 1996
- Launched: 26 July 1997
- In service: 23 June 1998
- Identification: IMO number: 9112727; MMSI number: 368707000; Callsign: NHLS
- Status: Active in Reduced Operational Status

General characteristics
- Class & type: Watson-class vehicle cargo ship
- Displacement: 29,000 tons
- Length: 950 ft
- Beam: 106 ft
- Draft: 34 ft
- Propulsion: Gas turbine

USNS Watson (T-AKR-310) is one of Military Sealift Command's nineteen Large, Medium-Speed Roll-on/Roll-off Ships and is part of the 33 ships in the Prepositioning Program. She is the lead ship of her class of vehicle cargo ships.

She was named for Private George Watson, a Medal of Honor recipient.

Laid down on 23 May 1996 and launched on 26 July 1997, Watson was put into service in the Pacific Ocean on 23 June 1998.

George Watson was transferred to the US Maritime Administration on 27 August 2025.

== Notable deployments ==
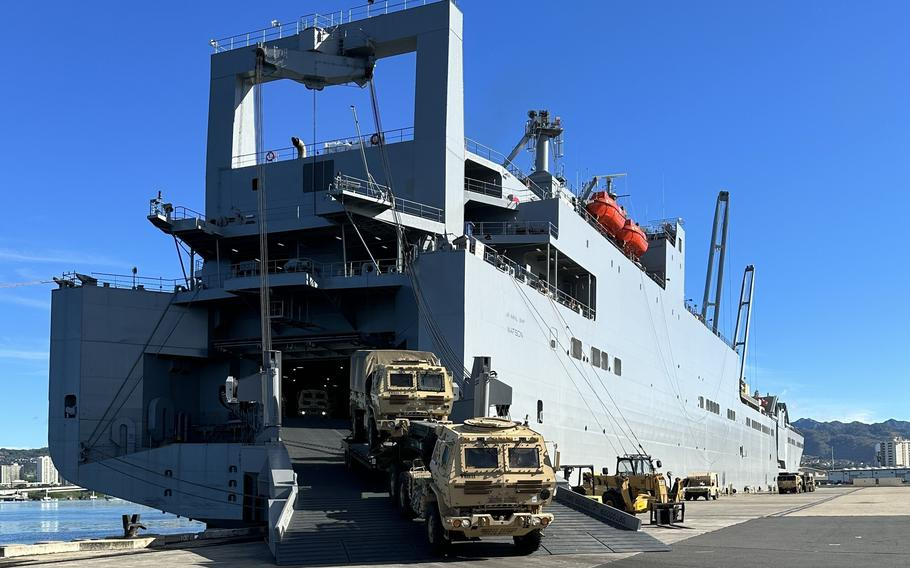
U.S. Naval Ship Watson at Honolulu, Hawaii, Tuesday, Nov. 29, 2022

In November 2022, Watson took onboard part of an Army Prepositioned Stock and then went to Hawaii, there delivering more than 500 pieces of equipment, vehicles and containers, in support of its Operation Pathways exercise to be held in Australia in 2023. Unloading was done by soldiers of the 8th Theater Sustainment Command, 25th Infantry Division, 599th Transportation Brigade, and 402nd Army Field Support Brigade. It was the first time Watson had visited Hawaii. The equipment will be inspected to ensure they're not carrying any pollen, animals or other organisms or material that could threaten ecosystems in Australia, before moving there.
