= Watson-class vehicle cargo ship =

Vehicle cargo ships in the US

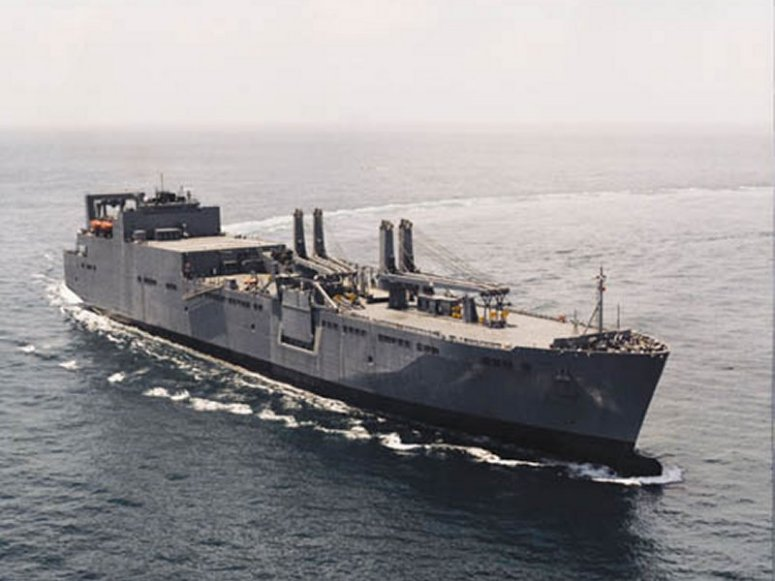
- USNS Watson, the lead ship of the class.

Class overview
- Name: Watson class
- Builders: National Steel and Shipbuilding Company
- Built: 1996–2002
- In commission: 1998-present
- Planned: 8
- Completed: 8
- Active: 8

General characteristics
- Type: Large, Medium-Speed Roll-on/Roll-off
- Displacement: 62,970 tons full
- Length: 951.4 ft (290.0 m)
- Beam: 106 ft (32.3 m)
- Draft: 34.1 ft (10.4 m) maximum
- Propulsion: 2 × General Electric LM2500 gas turbines, 64,000 hp (48 MW)
- Speed: 24 knots (44 km/h)
- Capacity: 393,000 ft^{2} (36,511 m^{2})
- Crew: 26 civilian crew (up to 45); up to 50 active duty
- Aviation facilities: helicopter landing area

The Watson-class vehicle cargo ship is a class of Large, Medium-Speed Roll-on/Roll-off cargo ship used for prepositioning of military vehicles and other materiel by the United States. The class comprises eight of Military Sealift Command's nineteen ships of this type, and is one part of the 33 ships involved in the Prepositioning Program. The ships are named after Medal of Honor recipients.

The lead ship of this class is USNS Watson. The class, as with the lead ship, was named for Private George Watson, a United States Army soldier killed at sea during World War II. Watson was laid down on 23 May 1996, launched on 26 July 1997, and put into service in the Pacific Ocean on 23 June 1998. The most recent ship of the class is USNS Soderman, laid down on 31 October 2000, launched on 26 April 2002, and put into service in the Pacific Ocean on 24 September 2002.

== Ships in Class ==
Ship	Hull. No.	Namesake	Laid down	Launched	Delivered	Status	Refs
Watson	T-AKR-310	George Watson	23 May 1996	26 July 1997	23 June 1998	Active	
Sisler	T-AKR-311	George K. Sisler	15 April 1997	28 February 1998	1 December 1998	Active	
Dahl	T-AKR-312	Larry G. Dahl	12 November 1997	2 October 1998	13 July 1999	Active	
Red Cloud	T-AKR-313	Mitchell Red Cloud	29 June 1998	7 August 1999	18 January 2000	Active	
Charlton	T-AKR-314	Cornelius H. Charlton	4 January 1999	11 December 1999	23 May 2000	Active	
Watkins	T-AKR-315	Travis E. Watkins	24 August 1999	28 July 2000	2 March 2001	Active	
Pomeroy	T-AKR-316	Ralph E. Pomeroy	25 April 2000	10 March 2001	14 August 2001	Active	
Sodermon	T-AKR-317	William A. Soderman	31 October 2000	26 April 2002	24 September 2002	Active	
