= MV Shughart =

Cargo ship of the United States Navy

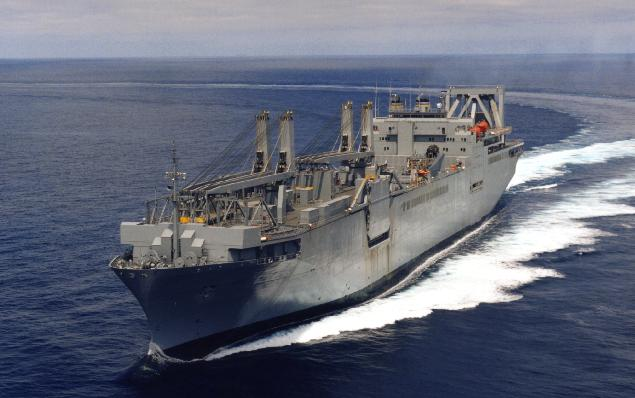
- USNS Shughart

History

United States
- Name: MV Shughart
- Namesake: Randall D. Shughart
- Owner: United States Maritime Administration
- Launched: 9 July 1980
- Sponsored by: Mrs. Stephanie Shughart
- Commissioned: 8 February 1997
- In service: 7 May 1996
- Stricken: 21 March 2023
- Home port: Baltimore
- Identification: IMO number: 7825394; MMSI number: 367822000; Callsign: NAOQ
- Status: Stricken, laid up in Beaumont, Texas, designated non-retention

General characteristics
- Class & type: Shughart-class cargo ship
- Displacement: 54,450 tons full load
- Length: 907 ft (276 m)
- Beam: 105.6 ft (32.2 m)
- Draft: 34.8 ft (10.6 m)
- Propulsion: 1 Burmeister & Wain 12L90 GFCA diesel; 1 shaft; bow and stern thrusters
- Speed: 24 knots (44 km/h)
- Range: 12,200 nautical miles (22,590 km) at 24 knots (44 km/h)
- Capacity: 312,461 sq ft (29,029 m^{2}).
- Complement: 26 civilian crew
- Armament: none
- Aircraft carried: One helicopter landing pad

MV Shughart (T-AKR-295) is a former non-combat vessel of the United States Navy, in service from 1996 to 2023. The lead ship of her class, she was designated as a "Large, Medium-Speed Roll-on/Roll-off" (LMSR) ship.

== History ==
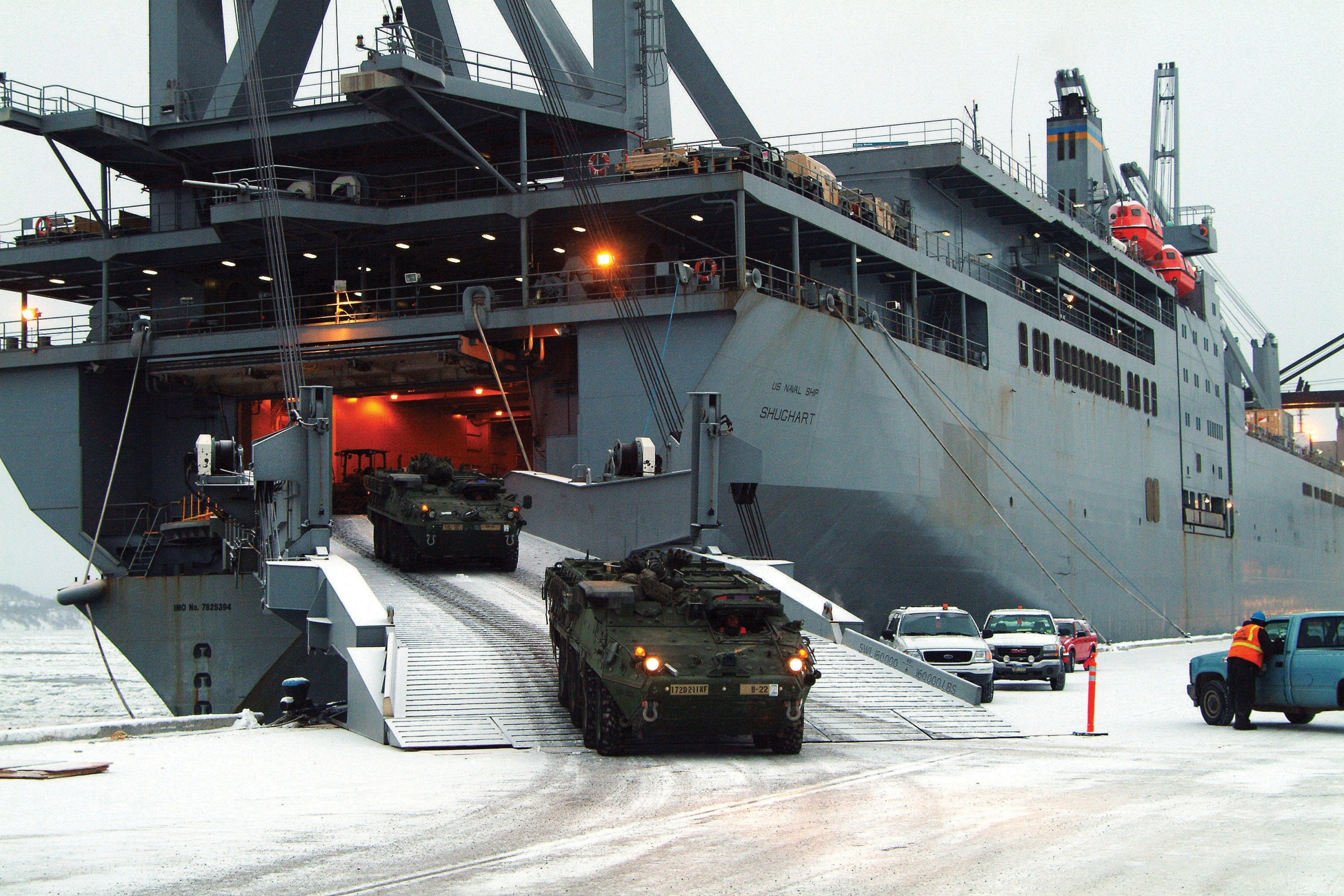
USNS Shughart unloading Stryker armored vehicles

She was originally the Laura Maersk, constructed in 1980 in Denmark by Lindøværftet for A. P. Moller-Maersk Group (Maersk). She was lengthened in 1987 and again in the early 1990s by Hyundai.

On 7 May 1996 Laura Maersk was delivered to Military Sealift Command and was outfitted at the National Steel and Shipbuilding Company's docks in San Diego, California. Operated by Bay Ship Management, the newly renovated ship was renamed USNS Shughart, in honor of Medal of Honor recipient US Army Sergeant First Class Randall D. Shughart. Senator Bob Kerrey of Nebraska was the ceremony's principal speaker and serving as the ship's sponsor was Mrs. Stephanie Shughart, Sergeant Shughart's widow. Shughart remains under the charter of the US Navy Military Sealift Command and is operated by US Merchant Mariners.

Shughart, along with others in her class, is capable of carrying 58 tanks, 48 other track vehicles, plus more than 900 trucks and other wheeled vehicles. To manipulate the cargo capacity, Shughart utilizes two 110-ton cranes, port and starboard ramps, and a stern ramp.

The ship was transferred to the United States Maritime Administration in March 2022 and became part of the Beaumont Reserve Fleet in Ready Reserve Force as MV Shughart (T-AKR-295), losing her USNS designation. She was stricken from the Naval Vessel Register on 21 March 2023.

USNS Yano former Leise Maersk
USNS GySgt. Fred W. Stockham former Lica Maersk
