= George Watson (Medal of Honor) =

American soldier and Medal of Honor recipient

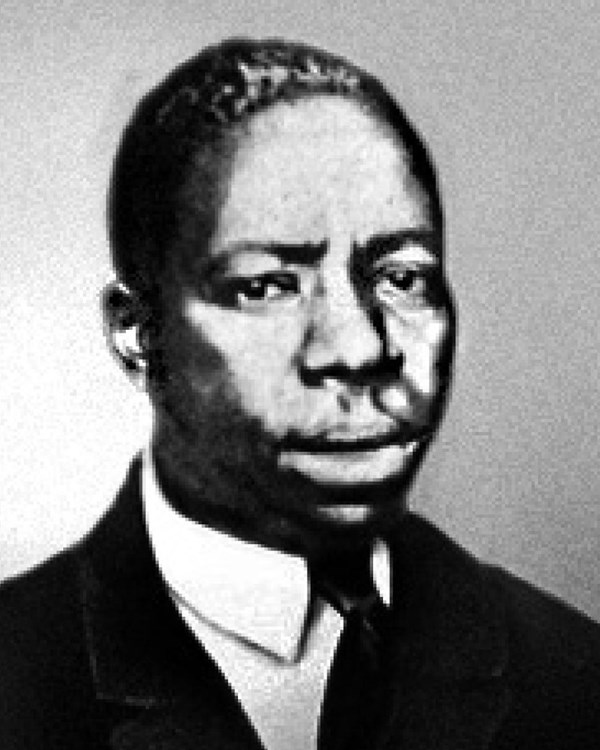
- Born: March 14, 1914; Laurel, Mississippi
- Died: March 8, 1943 (aged 28); SS 's Jacob, Porlock Bay, New Guinea
- Burial place: at sea
- Military career
- Allegiance: United States of America
- Branch: United States Army
- Service years: 1942–1943
- Rank: Private
- Units: 2nd Battalion, 29th Quartermaster Regiment L&B
- Conflicts: World War II
- Awards: Medal of Honor; Purple Heart

George Watson (March 14, 1914 – March 8, 1943) was a United States Army private who died while rescuing fellow soldiers from drowning at sea during World War II. In 1997, he was awarded the Medal of Honor, the nation's highest military decoration for valor, for his actions on March 8, 1943, near Porlock Harbor, New Guinea.

Watson and six other Black Americans who served in World War II were awarded the Medal of Honor on January 12, 1997. The Medal of Honor was posthumously presented to Watson by President Bill Clinton on January 13, 1997, at a White House ceremony for the seven recipients, the first and only Black Americans to be awarded the Medal of Honor for World War II.

== Biography ==
George Watson was born March 14, 1914, in Laurel, Mississippi. He later moved to Birmingham, Alabama. He attended Colorado A&M (Colorado State University) and graduated in 1942. He was married with one daughter. Watson was drafted and entered into the U.S. Army on September 1, 1942. After basic training at Camp Lee, Virginia, he was sent to Charleston, South Carolina. Next, he was sent to and arrived at Newport News, Virginia, where he embarked on the USS Hermitage (AP-54) which departed on December 27 for the Pacific Theatre. He was a member of the 2nd Battalion, 29th Quartermaster Regiment as a bath and laundry specialist. On January 31, 1943, after arriving at Brisbane, Australia, he embarked on the 's Jacob, a U.S. Army controlled chartered Dutch steamer.

On March 8, 1943, the U.S. Army Transport (USAT) Jacob was near Porlock Harbor, New Guinea, when it was attacked by nine high-flying Japanese bombers. The bombers scored three direct hits on the Jacob causing a large fire which could not be extinguished, so the order was given for all to abandon ship. After the ship was abandoned, Watson remained in the water and, instead of trying to save himself, assisted soldiers who could not swim into life rafts. Weakened by his exertions, he was dragged down by the suction of the sinking ship and drowned.

The Australian minesweeper HMAS Bendigo which had been escorting the Jacob, rescued 158 men. Watson's body was never recovered. On June 13, 1943, he was awarded posthumously the Army's second-highest medal for valor, the Distinguished Service Cross (DSC) for extraordinary heroism. He was the first Black American serviceman in World War II to receive this decoration.

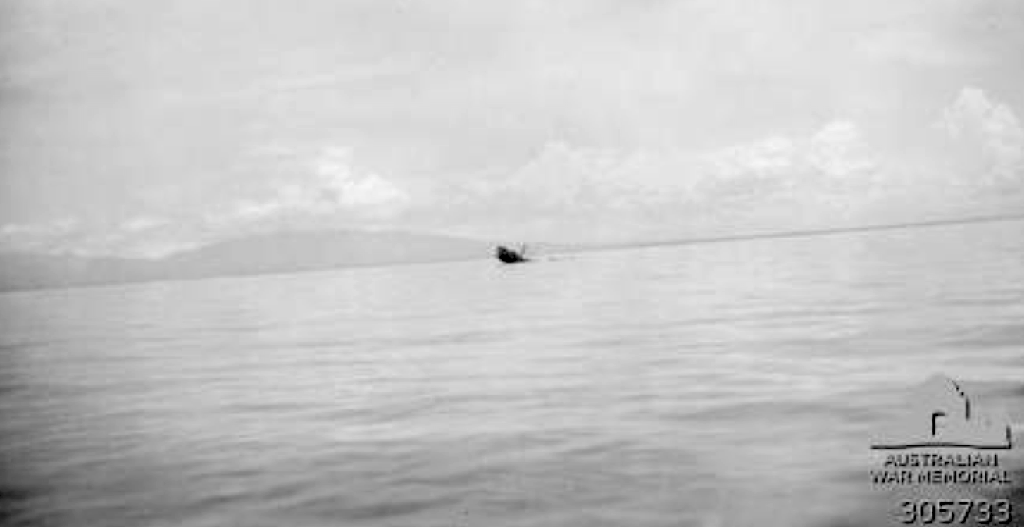
The U.S. Army Transport Jacob settles by the bow with survivors swimming in the water (March 8, 1943)

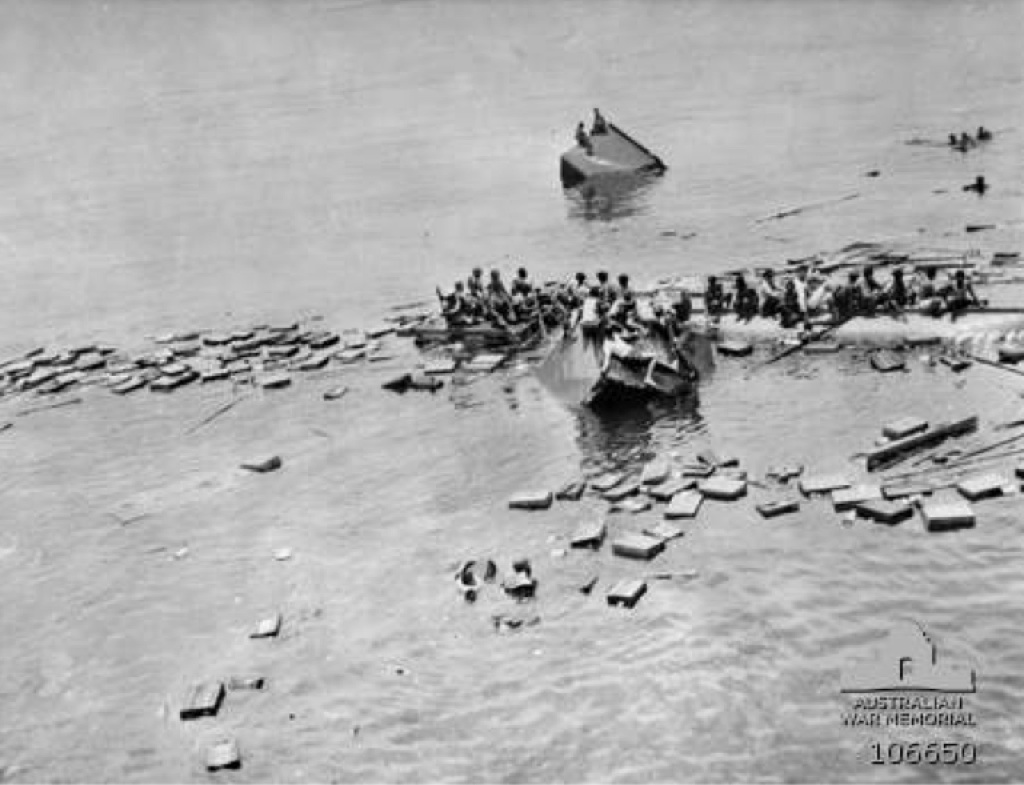
Survivors from the Jacob cling to wreckage before they are rescued

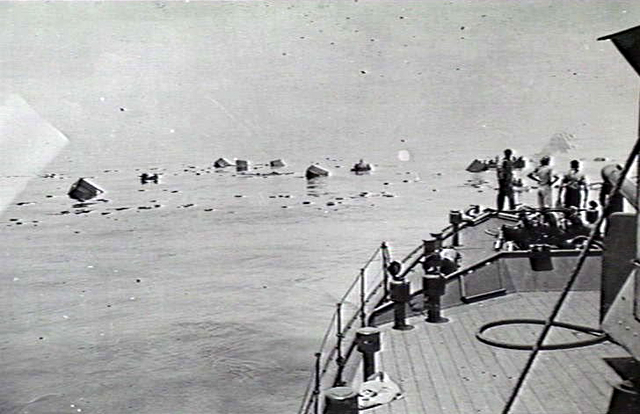
Survivors about to be rescued by HMAS Bendigo

== Medal of Honor ==
In the early 1990s, it was determined that Black soldiers had been denied consideration for the Medal of Honor (MOH) in World War II because of their race. In 1993, the U.S. Army had contracted Shaw University in Raleigh, North Carolina, to research and determine if there was racial disparity in the review process for recipients of the MOH. The study commissioned by the U.S. Army, described systematic racial discrimination in the criteria for awarding decorations during World War II. After an exhaustive review of files, the study recommended in 1996 that ten Black Americans who served in World War II be awarded the MOH. In October of that year, Congress passed legislation that would allow President Clinton to award the Medal of Honor to these former soldiers. Seven of the ten including Pvt. Watson were approved, and awarded the MOH (six had Distinguished Service Crosses revoked and upgraded to the MOH) on January 12, 1997. On January 13, 1997, President Clinton presented the MOH to the seven Black Americans; Pvt. Watson and five others were posthumously presented the MOH. Sergeant Major of the Army, Gene C. McKinney, accepted the MOH on behalf of Pvt. Watson during the ceremony. Vernon Baker was the only living recipient of the medal at the time.

Watson's Medal of Honor is displayed in the U.S. Army Quartermaster Museum at Fort Gregg-Adams, Virginia.

Several places and structures have been named in Watson's honor, including a field in Fort Benning, Georgia. In 1997, the United States Navy ship USNS Watson (T-AKR-310) was named in honor of George Watson. The Watson is the lead ship of her class of large, medium-speed, roll-on/roll-off (LMSR) ships.

Watson is memorialized at Walls of the Missing, Manila American Cemetery, Taguig, Philippines.

== Military awards ==
Watson's decorations and awards:

Medal of Honor	Purple Heart	Army Good Conduct Medal
American Campaign Medal	Asiatic-Pacific Campaign Medal w/ one 3/16" bronze star	World War II Victory Medal

== Medal of Honor citation ==
Watson's Medal of Honor citation reads:

The President of the United States in the name of The Congress takes pride in presenting the Medal of Honor posthumously to

Private George Watson
United States Army

Citation:

For conspicuous gallantry and intrepidity at the risk of life above and beyond the call of duty: Private George Watson, United States Army, distinguished himself by extraordinary heroism on 8 March 1943, while serving in the Pacific Command with the 2d Battalion, 29th Quartermaster Regiment, near Porlock Harbor, New Guinea. Private Watson was onboard a troop ship, the Dutch Steamer (United States Army Transport) Jacob, when it was attacked and hit by enemy bombers. Before it sank, the ship was abandoned. Private Watson, instead of seeking to save himself, remained in deep waters long enough to assist several soldiers who could not swim to reach the safety of a life raft. This heroic action, which subsequently cost him his life, resulted in saving the lives of several of his comrades. Weakened by continuous physical exertion and overcome by muscular fatigue, Private Watson drowned when the suction of the sinking ship dragged him beneath the surface of the swirling waters. His demonstrated bravery and unselfish act set in motion a train of compelling events that finally led to American victory in the Pacific. Private Watson's extraordinary valorous actions, his daring and inspiring leadership, and his self-sacrificing devotion to his fellow man exemplify the finest traditions of military service.

/S/ Bill Clinton

== See also ==
- Vernon Baker
- Edward A. Carter Jr.
- John R. Fox
- Willy F. James Jr.
- Ruben Rivers
- Charles L. Thomas
- List of Medal of Honor recipients for World War II
- List of African American Medal of Honor recipients
