= Travis E. Watkins =

United States Army Medal of Honor recipient

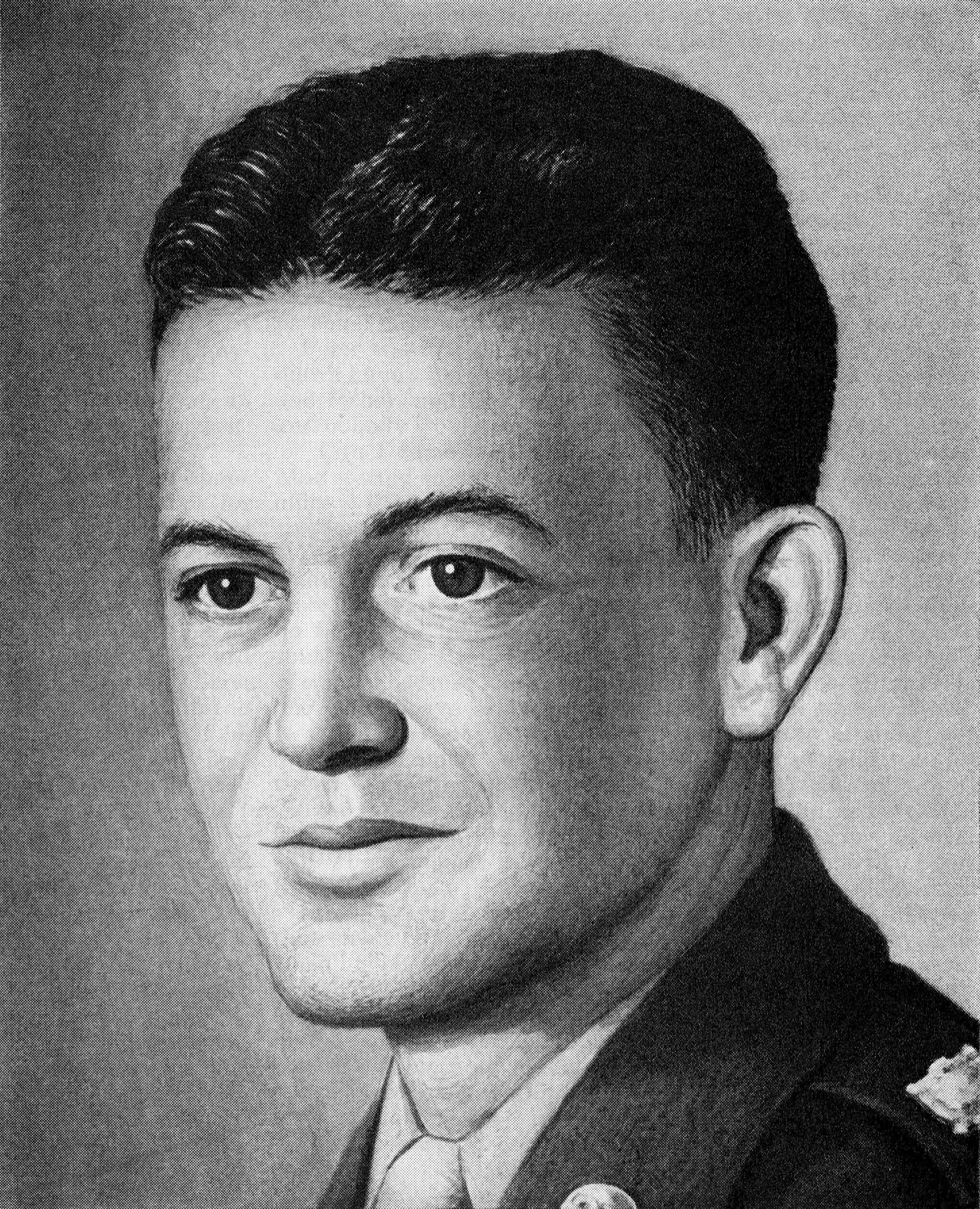
- 1951 illustration used to promote U.S. Savings Bonds
- Born: September 5, 1920; Waldo, Arkansas
- Died: September 3, 1950 (aged 29) near Yeongsan, South Korea
- Burial place: Gladewater Memorial Cemetery, Gladewater, Texas
- Military career
- Allegiance: United States
- Branch: United States Army
- Service years: 1939–1950
- Rank: Master Sergeant
- Units: Company H, 9th Infantry Regiment, 2nd Infantry Division
- Conflicts: World War II • Guadalcanal Campaign; Korean War • Battle of Yongsan †
- Awards: Medal of Honor; Bronze Star; Purple Heart

Travis Earl Watkins (September 5, 1920 – September 3, 1950) was a United States Army soldier and a posthumous recipient of the Medal of Honor for his actions in the Korean War. A veteran of World War II, Watkins was awarded the medal for his conspicuous leadership during the Battle of Yongsan.

== Early life and career ==
Watkins was born in Waldo, Arkansas, on September 5, 1920. His family moved to East Texas when he was a young child and he attended school in the city of Troup.

Enlisting in the U.S. Army in June 1939, Watkins served in World War II and was awarded the Bronze Star for his actions during the Guadalcanal Campaign. He returned to Texas after the war and in 1948 married Madie Sue Barnett.

== Korean War ==
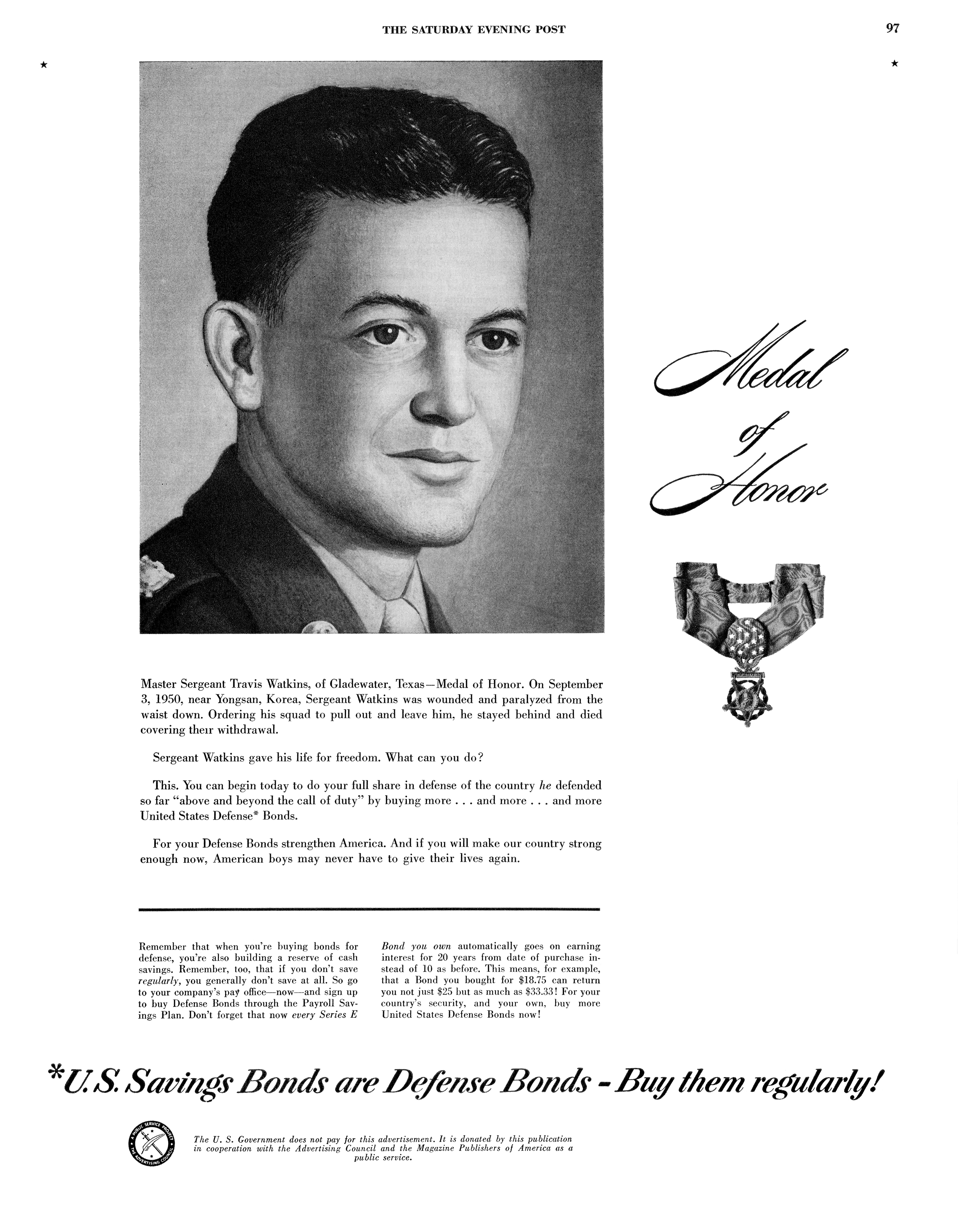
July 1951 magazine advertisement for U.S. Savings Bonds featuring an illustration of Medal of Honor recipient Travis E. Watkins

In the Korean War, Watkins served as a master sergeant with Company H of the 9th Infantry Regiment, 2nd Infantry Division. Near Yeongsan, Korea, on August 31, 1950, he was among a group of 30 soldiers who were cut off and surrounded by a numerically superior North Korean force. Watkins took command and directed the group's defense, exposing himself to hostile fire in order to lead and encourage his men. When ammunition became scarce, he crossed the defensive perimeter to collect weapons from the bodies of two North Korean soldiers whom he had killed. Encountering three hostile soldiers, he was wounded but managed to kill the three men and took their weapons and ammunition as well before returning to friendly lines.

Later, six North Koreans gained a position which allowed them to throw grenades into the American defenses. Watkins rose from his foxhole and killed the six soldiers with his rifle. Hit by machine gun fire in the process, he was rendered paralyzed from the waist down. Despite his severe injuries, he continued to encourage his men and refused all food, preferring to save it for others. Realizing that the position was untenable, on September 3 he ordered the group to withdraw and leave him behind. He died of his wounds soon after. For these actions, he was posthumously awarded the Medal of Honor six months later, on February 16, 1951.

== Honors and legacy ==
Two days short of his 30th birthday upon his death, Watkins was buried at Gladewater Memorial Cemetery in Gladewater, Texas. Every year since 2008, a memorial ceremony has been held at his grave on the Saturday closest to National Medal of Honor Day. The transport ship USNS Watkins (T-AKR-315) was named in his honor.

== Medal of Honor citation ==
Watkins' official Medal of Honor citation reads as follows:

M/Sgt. Watkins distinguished himself by conspicuous gallantry and intrepidity above and beyond the call of duty in action against the enemy. When an overwhelming enemy force broke through and isolated 30 men of his unit, he took command, established a perimeter defense and directed action which repelled continuous, fanatical enemy assaults. With his group completely surrounded and cut off, he moved from foxhole to foxhole exposing himself to enemy fire, giving instructions and offering encouragement to his men. Later when the need for ammunition and grenades became critical he shot 2 enemy soldiers 50 yards outside the perimeter and went out alone for their ammunition and weapons. As he picked up their weapons he was attacked by 3 others and wounded. Returning their fire he killed all 3 and gathering up the weapons of the 5 enemy dead returned to his amazed comrades. During a later assault, 6 enemy soldiers gained a defiladed spot and began to throw grenades into the perimeter making it untenable. Realizing the desperate situation and disregarding his wound he rose from his foxhole to engage them with rifle fire. Although immediately hit by a burst from an enemy machine gun he continued to fire until he had killed the grenade throwers. With this threat eliminated he collapsed and despite being paralyzed from the waist down, encouraged his men to hold on. He refused all food, saving it for his comrades, and when it became apparent that help would not arrive in time to hold the position ordered his men to escape to friendly lines. Refusing evacuation as his hopeless condition would burden his comrades, he remained in his position and cheerfully wished them luck. Through his aggressive leadership and intrepid actions, this small force destroyed nearly 500 of the enemy before abandoning their position. M/Sgt. Watkins' sustained personal bravery and noble self-sacrifice reflect the highest glory upon himself and is in keeping with the esteemed traditions of the U.S. Army.

== See also ==
- List of Korean War Medal of Honor recipients
