= USNS Sisler =

Cargo ship of the United States Navy

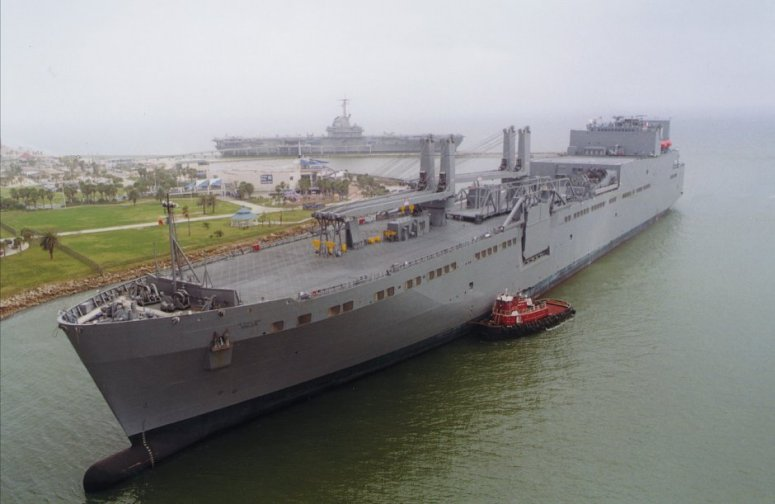

History

United States
- Awarded: 20 October 1994
- Builder: National Steel and Shipbuilding Company
- Laid down: 15 April 1997
- Launched: 28 February 1998
- In service: 1 December 1998
- Identification: IMO number: 9117038; MMSI number: 368734000; Callsign: NZIX
- Status: in service

General characteristics
- Class & type: Watson-class vehicle cargo ship
- Displacement: 29,000 tons
- Length: 950 ft
- Beam: 106 ft
- Draft: 34 ft
- Propulsion: Gas turbine
- Complement: 26 civilians, up to 50 active duty

USNS Sisler (T-AKR-311) is one of Military Sealift Command's nineteen Large, Medium-Speed Roll-on/Roll-off Ships and is part of the 33 ships in the Prepositioning Program. She is a Watson-class vehicle cargo ship named for First Lieutenant George K. Sisler, a Medal of Honor recipient.

Laid down on 15 April 1997 and launched on 28 February 1998, Sisler was put into service in the Pacific Ocean on 1 December 1998. She is operated by a civilian crew of 26, plus up to 50 active duty personnel.

== Bibliography ==
- Saunders, Stephen, ed. (2004). Jane's Fighting Ships 2004–2005. Coulsdon, UK: Jane's Information Group. ISBN 0-7106-2623-1.
