= USNS Soderman (T-AKR-317) =

Cargo ship of the United States Navy

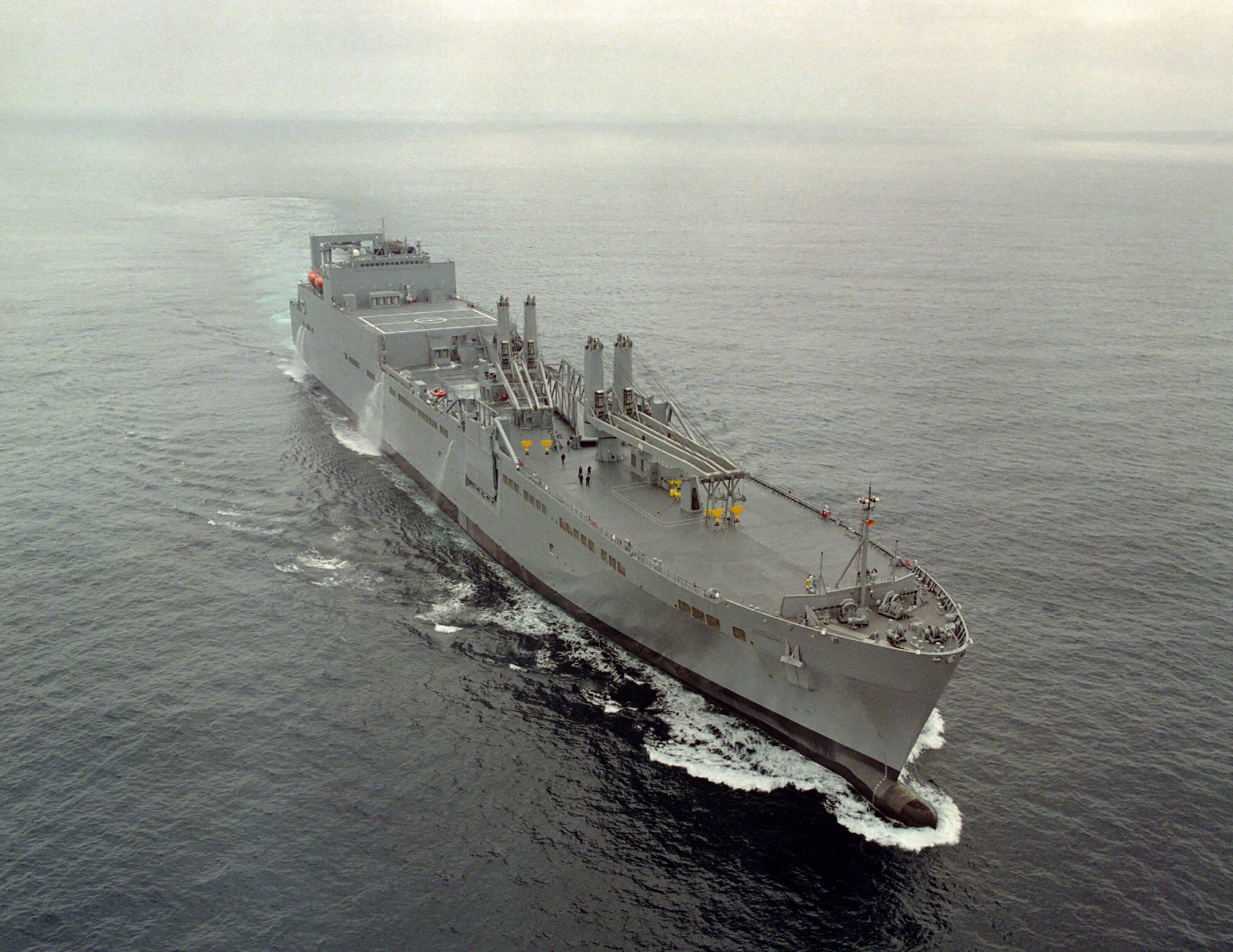
- USNS SODERMAN (T-AKR 317), underway during the builder's sea trials.

History

United States
- Name: USNS Soderman (T-AKR-317)
- Ordered: 25 February 2000
- Builder: National Steel and Shipbuilding Company
- Laid down: 31 October 2000
- Launched: 26 April 2002
- In service: 24 September 2002
- Identification: IMO number: 9232254; MMSI number: 367819000; Callsign: NANL
- Status: in service

General characteristics
- Class & type: Watson-class vehicle cargo ship
- Displacement: 29,000 tons
- Length: 950 ft
- Beam: 106 ft
- Draft: 34 ft
- Propulsion: 2 GE LM-2500 Gas turbine
- Speed: 24 Knots
- Range: 13,800 miles
- Complement: 30 civilian mariners

USNS Soderman (T-AKR-317) is a Large, Medium-Speed Roll-on/Roll-off Ship (LMSR) and is part of the Military Sealift Command. The USNS Soderman is in the Preposition Program which stations ships across the world with military equipment. The Soderman is Watson-class vehicle cargo ship built by National Steel and Shipbuilding Company. The ship was launched on April 26, 2002, and put into service on September 24, 2002. The ship was named after Private First Class William A. Soderman, a Medal of Honor recipient for World War II.

== Naming ==
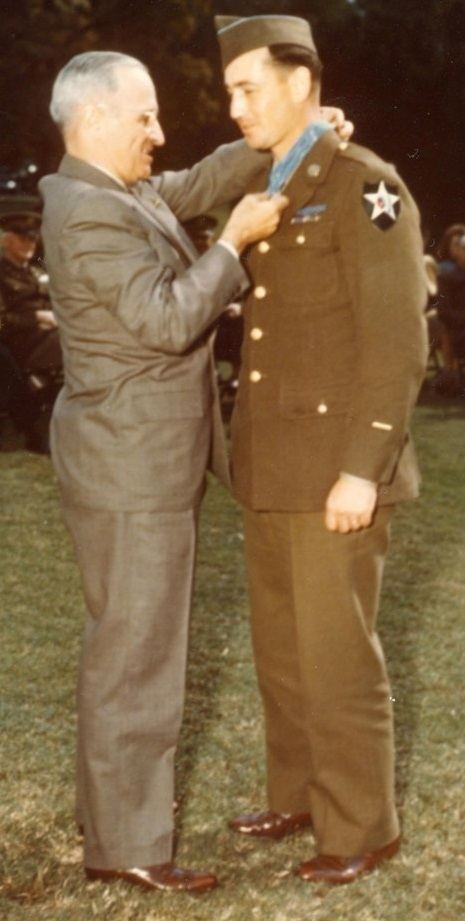
Pfc William A. Soderman receives the MOH on the White House lawn, 12 October 1945

The USNS Soderman (T-AKR-317) is the second ship to be named after the Medal of Honor recipient William A. Soderman. The first ship has been renamed USNS GySgt. Fred W. Stockham (T-AK-3017) which is a Shughart-class container & roll-on roll-off. William A. Soderman was awarded the Medal of Honor for his heroism during World War II's Battle of the Bulge. William Soderman received the Medal of Honor from President Harry S. Truman on the White House lawn, October 12, 1945. The wife of William Soderman, Virginia Soderman was there for the christening of the ship. Names for Navy ships traditionally have been chosen and announced by the Secretary of the Navy, under the direction of the President and in accordance with rules prescribed by Congress. For most of the 19th century, U.S. law included language explicitly assigning the Secretary of the Navy the task of naming new Navy ships.

== Construction ==
The USNS Soderman is a Watson-class Large Medium-Speed Roll on, Roll off ship. The ship was designed and built by National Steel and Shipbuilding Company (NASSCO). The ship was laid down October 31, 2000 at NASSCO's shipyard in San Diego, California. Soderman was launched in San Diego Bay on April 26, 2002.

=== Hull Arrangement ===
The ship has berthing, recreation and office spaces for a crew of 30 people as well as room for more if a surge is required.

=== Propulsion Plant ===
The Soderman has two General Electric LM2500 gas turbines that make 64,000BHP and drive two 24' controllable pitch propellers that turn at 95 RPM at full power. The ship has the capability of making 12,500 KW of electrical power for shipboard use. The emergency generator has a 2,000 KW capacity. The design speed of the ship is 24 knots (28 mph; 44 km/h) with a range of 13,800 miles (22,200 km). The ship has bow thruster units.

=== Cargo System ===
The Soderman has a centerline stern slewing ramp as well as port and starboard side port ramps systems which can be used with the new Mobile Landing Platform or (MLP ships) that have just been built. The ship also has two single pedestal twin cranes. The Roll On / Roll Off decks are fixed to the ship as well as fixed and hinged ramps inside the cargo hold. The cargo holds also has environment control as well as foam firefighting and dewatering systems.

== Mission and Operations ==
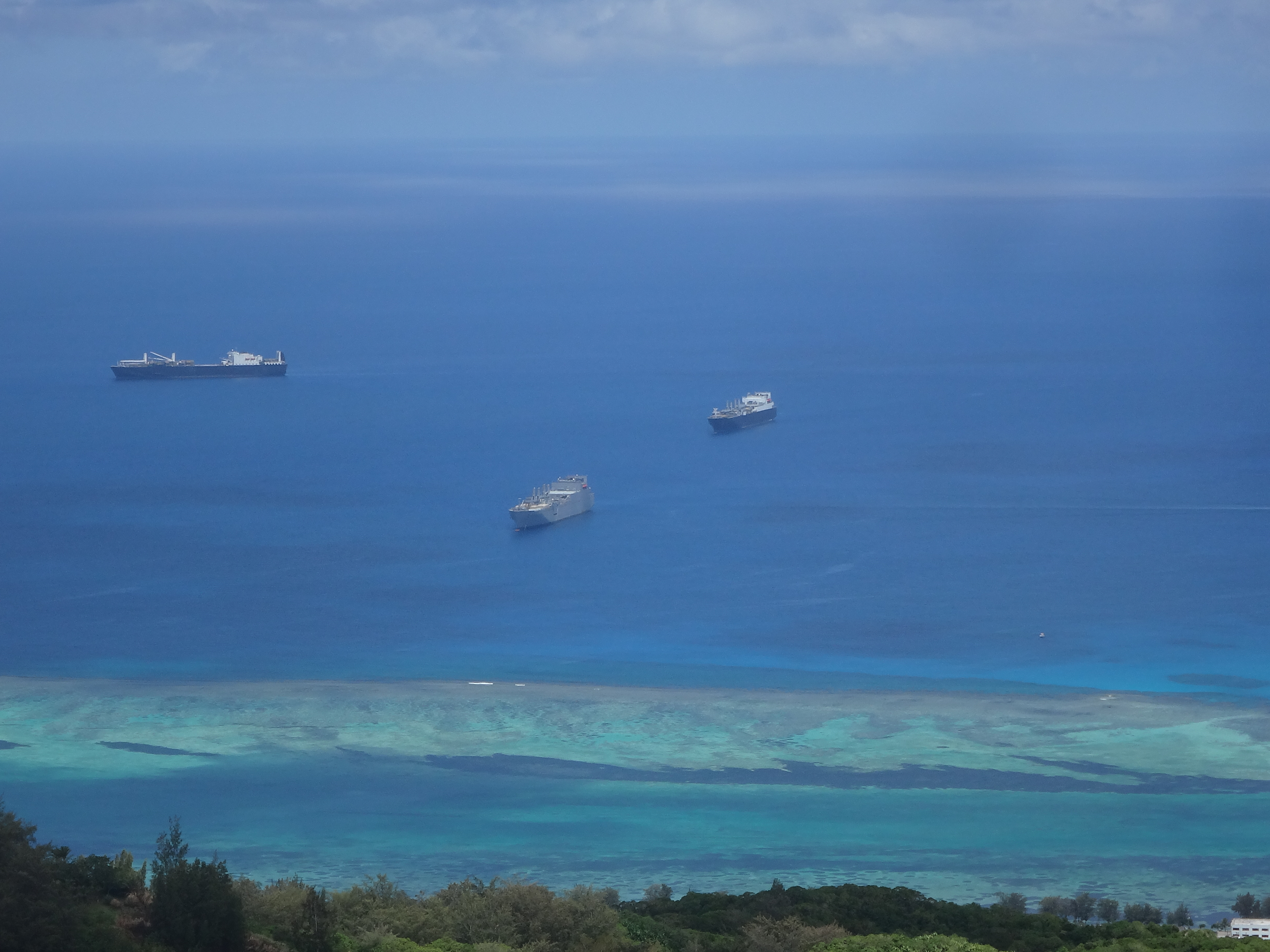
USNS Soderman off the coast of Saipan.

The mission of the USNS Soderman as part of the Combat Prepositioning Ships is to support the US Army. The CPS program prepositions enough ammunition, food, water, fuel, equipment, and other supplies to sustain elements of two U.S. Army Heavy divisions which may have up to 24,000 personnel for up to 30 days. The crew of the Soderman are civilian mariners and the ship is operated by the Navy's Military Sealift Command. On October 4, 2012 the US Coast Guard used a MH-65C Dolphin helicopter to do a medical evacuation of a contractor aboard the USNS Soderman which was operating off the coast of Hawaii. In October 2013, the US Navy awarded the crewing contract to Patriot Contract Services LLC. The contract was for all 8 Watson-class ships in the MSC inventory, and was for a little over $63,000,000 a year. The contract included four one year options which could bring the total amount of the contract to 330,000,000 by the end of September 2018.
