= USNS Watkins =

Cargo ship of the United States Navy

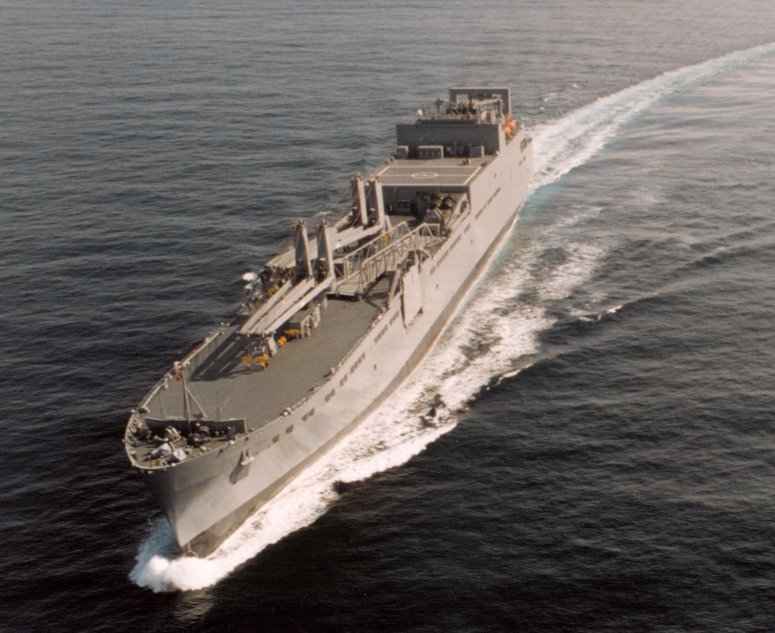

History

United States
- Ordered: 23 May 1997
- Builder: National Steel and Shipbuilding Company
- Laid down: 24 August 1999
- Launched: 28 July 2000
- In service: 2 March 2001
- Identification: IMO number: 9232230; MMSI number: 338815000; Callsign: NIJB
- Status: in service

General characteristics
- Class & type: Watson-class vehicle cargo ship
- Displacement: 29,000 tons
- Length: 950 ft
- Beam: 106 ft
- Draft: 34 ft
- Propulsion: Gas turbine

USNS Watkins (T-AKR-315) is one of Military Sealift Command's nineteen Large, Medium-Speed Roll-on/Roll-off Ships and is part of the 33 ships in the Prepositioning Program. She is a Watson-class vehicle cargo ship.

She was named for Master Sergeant Travis E. Watkins, a Medal of Honor recipient.

Laid down on 24 August 1999 and launched on 28 July 2000, Watkins was put into service in the Pacific Ocean on 2 March 2001.

According to The Guardian the human rights group Reprieve identified the Watkins and sixteen other USN vessels as having held "ghost prisoners" in clandestine extrajudicial detention.

The Navy announced it would transfer the USNS Watkins on 1 July 2026 to the US Maritime Administration.
