= USNS Dahl =

Cargo ship of the United States Navy

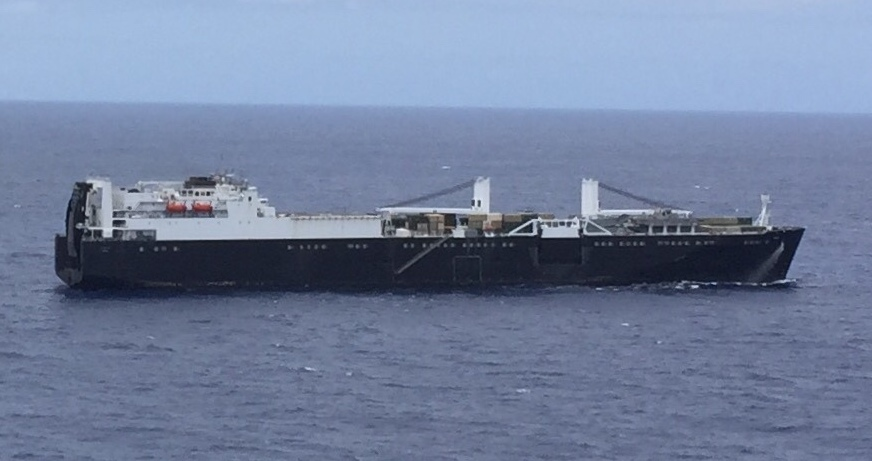
- USNS Dahl in 2015

History

United States
- Awarded: 20 October 1994
- Builder: National Steel and Shipbuilding Company
- Laid down: 12 November 1997
- Launched: 2 October 1998
- In service: 13 July 1999
- Identification: IMO number: 9117040; MMSI number: 368700000; Callsign: NZJB
- Status: in active service

General characteristics
- Class & type: Watson-class vehicle cargo ship
- Displacement: 29,000 tons
- Length: 950 ft
- Beam: 106 ft
- Draft: 34 ft
- Propulsion: Gas turbine

USNS Dahl (T-AKR-312) is one of Military Sealift Command's nineteen Large, Medium-Speed Roll-on/Roll-off Ships and is part of the 33 ships in the Prepositioning Program. She is a Watson-class vehicle cargo ship named for Specialist Larry G. Dahl, a Medal of Honor recipient.

Laid down on 12 November 1997 and launched on 2 October 1998, Dahl was put into service in the Pacific Ocean on 13 July 1999.

According to The Guardian, the human rights group Reprieve identified the Dahl and sixteen other USN vessels as having held "ghost prisoners" in clandestine extrajudicial detention.
