= MV Cornelius H. Charlton =

Cargo ship of the United States Navy

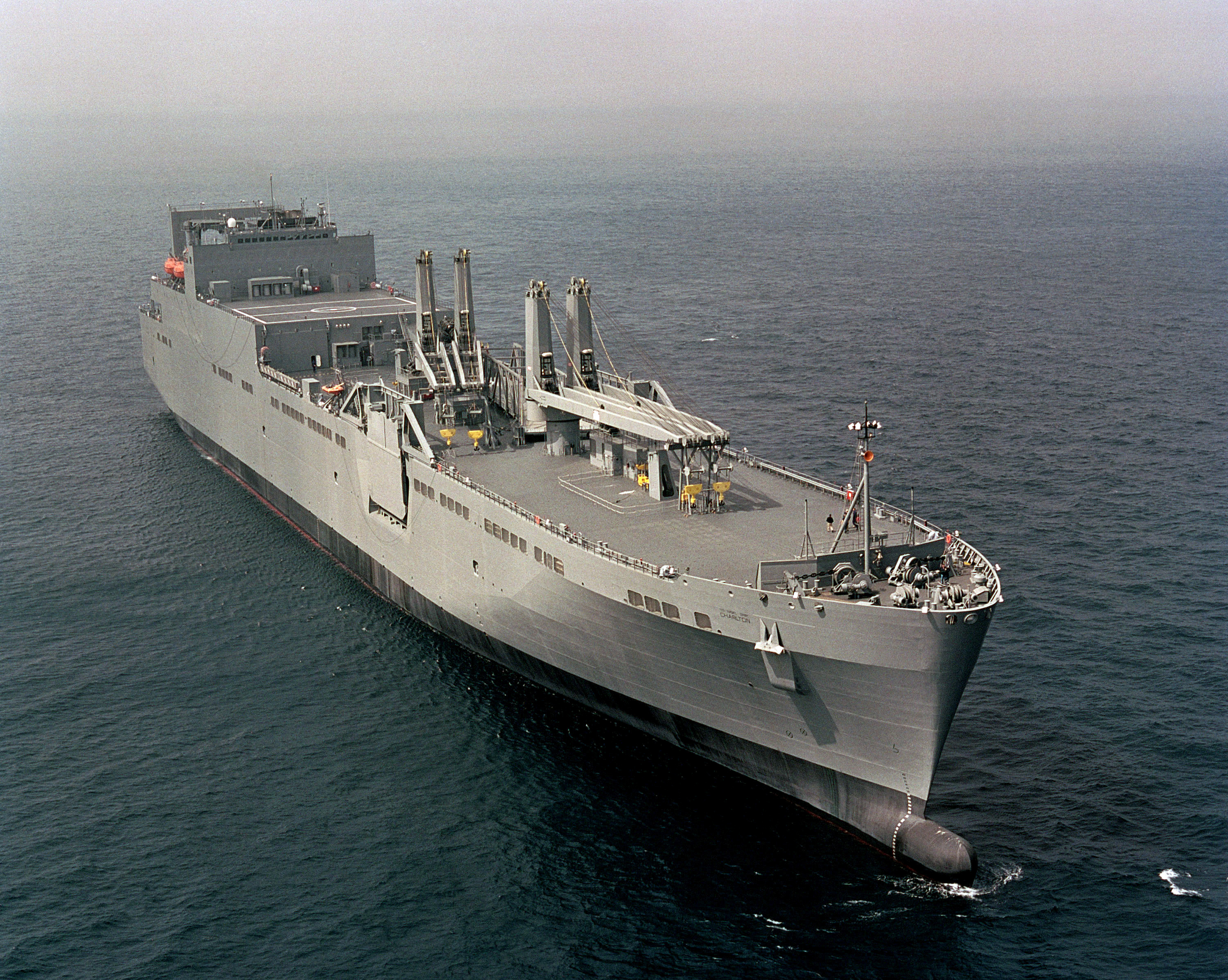

History

United States
- Ordered: 26 November 1996
- Builder: National Steel and Shipbuilding Company
- Laid down: 4 January 1999
- Launched: 11 December 1999
- In service: 23 May 2000
- Identification: IMO number: 9231664; MMSI number: 338902000; Callsign: NJTC
- Status: Active in Reduced Operational Status

General characteristics
- Class & type: Watson-class vehicle cargo ship
- Displacement: 69,000 tons
- Length: 950 ft
- Beam: 106 ft
- Draft: 34 ft
- Propulsion: Gas turbine

USNS Charlton (T-AKR-314) is one of Military Sealift Command's nineteen Large, Medium-Speed Roll-on/Roll-off Ships and is part of the 33 ships in the Prepositioning Program. She is a Watson-class vehicle cargo ship named for Sergeant Cornelius H. Charlton, a Medal of Honor recipient.

== History ==
Laid down on 4 January 1999 and launched on 11 December 1999, Charlton was put into service in the Pacific Ocean on 23 May 2000.

Cornelius H. Charlton was transferred to the US Maritime Administration on 30 September 2025.
