= USNS GySgt. Fred W. Stockham =

Cargo ship of the United States Navy

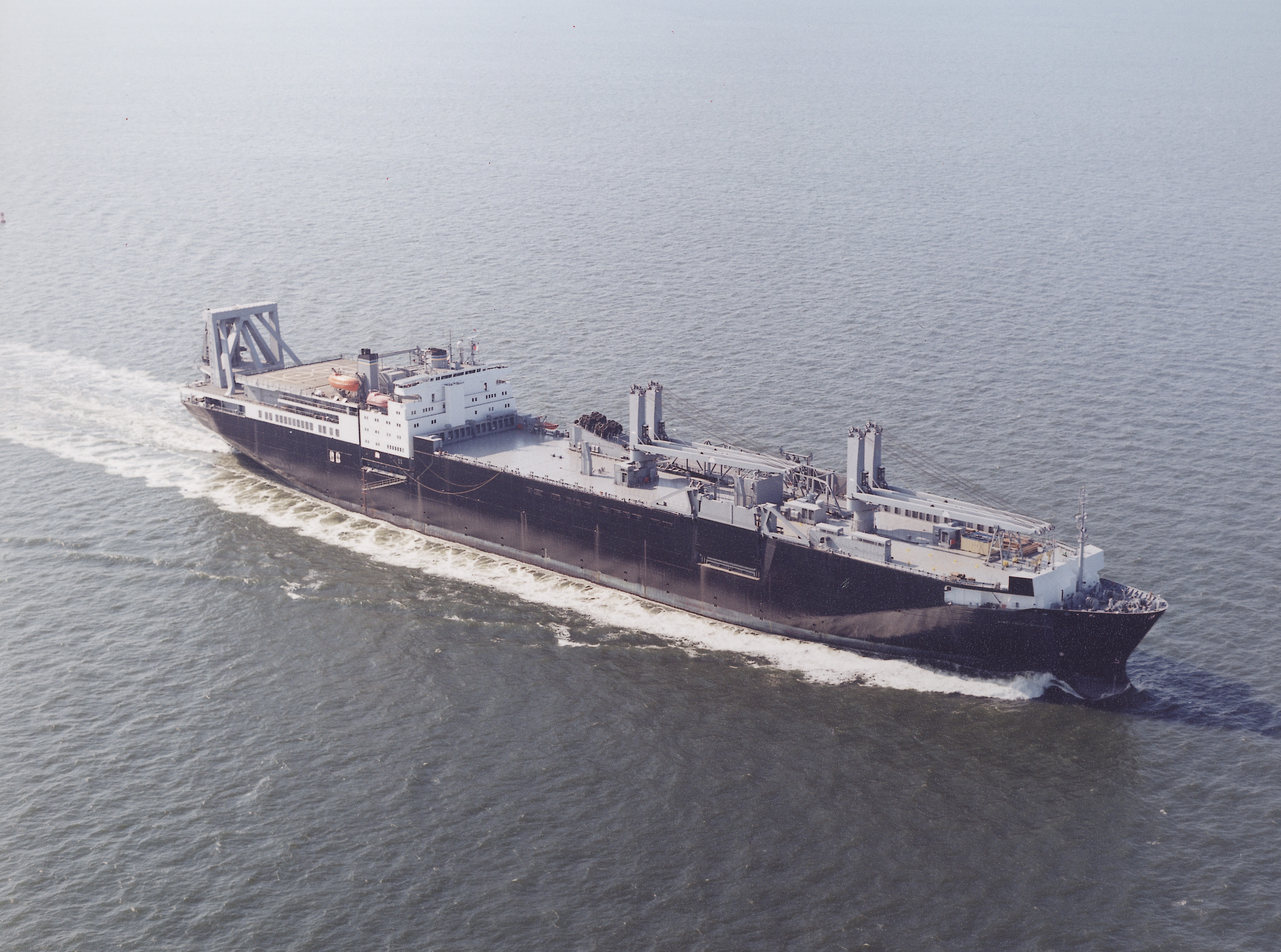
- USNS Fred W. Stockham sailing to its naming in 2001.

History
- Name: MV Lica Maersk
- Launched: 20 March 1981
- Fate: Sold to the U.S. Navy, 11 November 1997

United States
- Name: USNS Soderman
- Namesake: William A. Soderman
- Acquired: 11 November 1997
- In service: 1998–2000
- Renamed: USNS GySgt Fred W. Stockham
- In service: 1 March 2001
- Stricken: 30 June 2025
- Identification: IMO number: 7825423; MMSI number: 367211000; Callsign: NUJR
- Fate: Sold for scrap

General characteristics
- Displacement: 54,298 t. (full); 32,589 t. (light)
- Length: 907 ft (276 m)
- Beam: 106 ft (32 m)
- Draft: 36 ft (11 m)
- Installed power: 47,000 hp (35 MW)
- Propulsion: 1 Burmeister & Wain 12L90 GFCA diesel; 1 shaft; bow and stern thrusters
- Speed: 22 knots (41 km/h)
- Capacity: 312,461 sq ft (29,029 m^{2})
- Complement: 29 civilian mariners, 2 naval officers, 48 enlisted
- Aviation facilities: helicopter platform

USNS GySgt Fred W. Stockham (T-AK-3017) is a Shughart-class container & roll-on roll-off support vessel in the United States Navy's Military Sealift Command (MSC). The vessel is the second Navy ship named after Marine Gunnery Sergeant Fred W. Stockham (1881–1918), who was posthumously awarded the Medal of Honor during World War I.

The ship was originally built as MV Lica Maersk, at the Lindovaerftet shipyard, in Odense, Denmark, and delivered for commercial service with the Maersk Line circa 1980. She was acquired by the U.S. Navy on 11 November 1997, and converted for MSC service as a Large, Medium Speed, Roll-On/Roll-Off (LMSR) sealift ship at National Steel and Shipbuilding Co. (NASSCO), in San Diego, California.

The ship was renamed USNS Soderman (T-AKR-299) — the first Navy ship named after PFC William A. Soderman (1912–1980), who was awarded the Medal of Honor for heroism during World War II's Battle of the Bulge. Soderman was placed in service in 1998, operated by Bay Ship Management Inc. under the direction of the MSC. She was placed out of service in 2000 for conversion to an enhanced prepositioning ship. The ship was placed back in service as USNS GySgt Fred W. Stockham (T-AK-3017) on 1 March 2001. Her new namesake, Gunnery Sergeant Fred W. Stockham, USMC, was awarded the Medal of Honor, posthumously, for heroism at the Battle of Belleau Wood in 1918. GySgt Fred W. Stockham is one of the Military Sealift Command's seventeen container & roll-on/roll-off ships, and one of the 36 ships in the Prepositioning Program. Stockham is assigned to Maritime Prepositioning Program Squadron Two which operates out of Diego Garcia.

On May 31, 2008 The Guardian reported that the human rights group Reprieve named the Stockham as one of up to sixteen US Naval vessels that may have been used to covertly hold captives.

On June 30, 2025 the Stockham was stricken from the naval registry, and arrived for scrapping in Brownsville, Texas under her own power.
