= Vehicle cargo ship =

US Navy cargo ships used for vehicle deployment

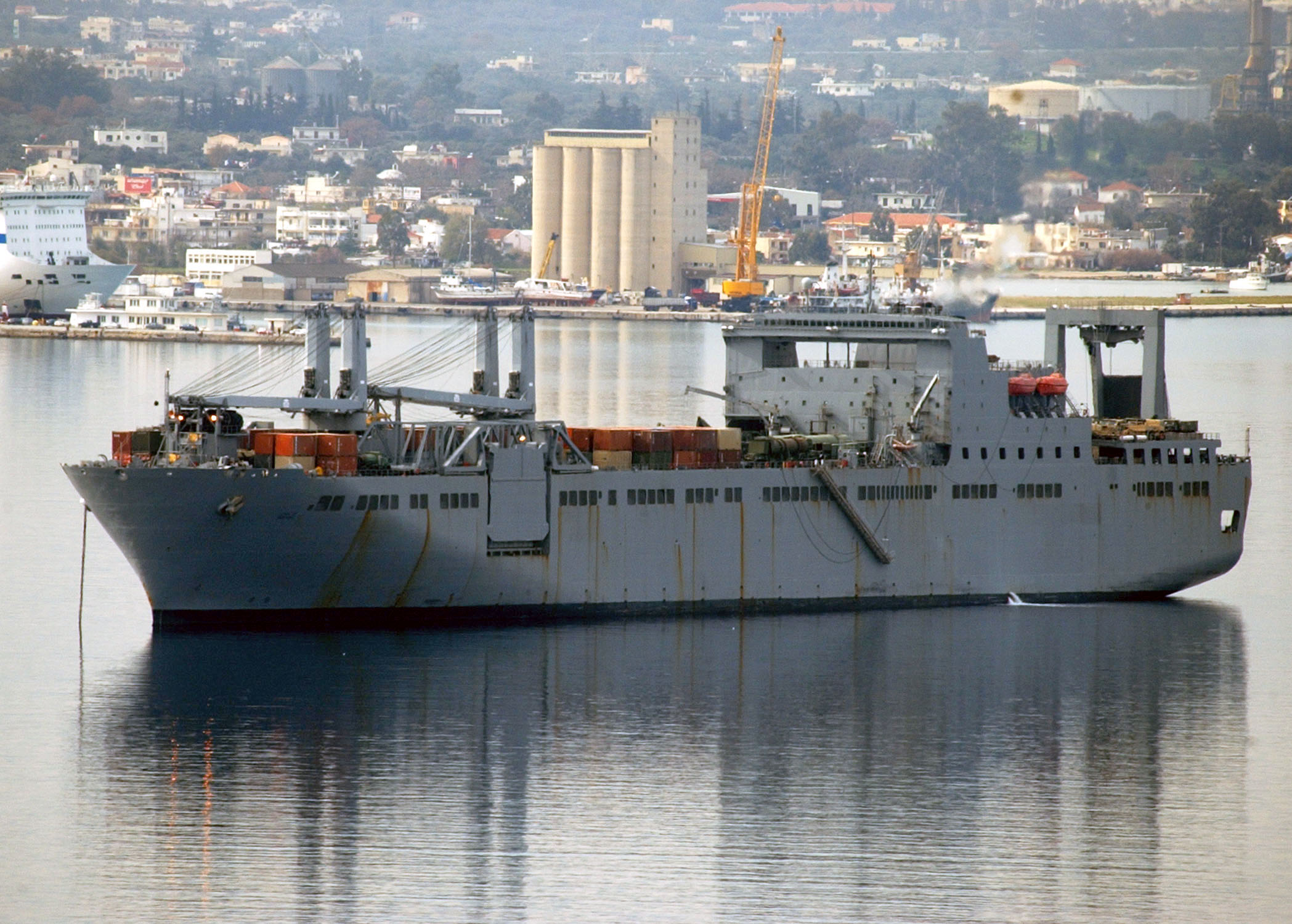
USNS Bob Hope in harbor at Souda Bay in Crete, Greece

Vehicle cargo ship is a model of United States Navy ship used for the prepositioning of Army vehicles. Examples of this are the Bob Hope-class, Watson-class, Gordon-class, and Stughart-class. USNS Comet was the first roll-on, roll-off vehicle cargo ship to enter service with the US Navy.
