= List of Military Sealift Command ships =

Military Sealift Command ships as of January 2022

This is a list of Military Sealift Command ships. The fleet includes about 130 ships in eight programs: Fleet Oiler (PM1), Special Mission (PM2), Strategic Sealift (PM3), Tow, Salvage, Tender, and Hospital Ship (PM4), Sealift (PM5), Combat Logistics Force (PM6), Expeditionary Mobile Base, Amphibious Command Ship, and Cable Layer (PM7) and Expeditionary Fast Transport (PM8).

All MSC ships are divided into eight main categories according to	program.
Each category is further divided into subcategories according to	ship type.

== List of current Military Sealift Command ships ==
Fleet Oiler Program (PM1)
Fleet Replenishment Oiler (T-AO)
Name	Hull No.	Class	Photo	Notes
USNS Henry J. Kaiser	(T-AO-187)	Henry J. Kaiser		
USNS Joshua Humphreys	(T-AO-188)	Henry J. Kaiser		To be removed from service 2025
USNS John Lenthall	(T-AO-189)	Henry J. Kaiser		To be removed from service 2023
USNS John Ericsson	(T-AO-194)	Henry J. Kaiser		
USNS Leroy Grumman	(T-AO-195)	Henry J. Kaiser		
USNS Kanawha	(T-AO-196)	Henry J. Kaiser		
USNS Pecos	(T-AO-197)	Henry J. Kaiser		To be removed from service 2026
USNS Big Horn	(T-AO-198)	Henry J. Kaiser		
USNS Tippecanoe	(T-AO-199)	Henry J. Kaiser		
USNS Guadalupe	(T-AO-200)	Henry J. Kaiser		
USNS Patuxent	(T-AO-201)	Henry J. Kaiser		
USNS Yukon	(T-AO-202)	Henry J. Kaiser		
USNS Laramie	(T-AO-203)	Henry J. Kaiser		
USNS Rappahannock	(T-AO-204)	Henry J. Kaiser		
USNS John Lewis	(T-AO-205)	John Lewis		
USNS Oscar V. Peterson	(T-AO-206)	John Lewis		
Special Mission Program (PM2)
Missile Range Instrumentation (T-AGM)
Name	Hull No.	Class	Photo	Notes
USNS Invincible	(T-AGM-24)	Stalwart		
USNS Howard O. Lorenzen	(T-AGM-25)	Howard O. Lorenzen		
Navigation Test Support (T-AGS)
Name	Hull No.	Class	Photo	Notes
USNS Waters	(T-AGS-45)	Waters		
Oceanographic Survey (T-AGS)
Name	Hull No.	Class	Photo	Notes
USNS Pathfinder	(T-AGS-60)	Pathfinder		
USNS Bowditch	(T-AGS-62)	Pathfinder		
USNS Henson	(T-AGS-63)	Pathfinder		
USNS Bruce C. Heezen	(T-AGS-64)	Pathfinder		
USNS Mary Sears	(T-AGS-65)	Pathfinder		
USNS Marie Tharp	(T-AGS-66)	Pathfinder	USNS Maury	
Sea-Based X-Band Radar (SBX)
Name	Hull No.	Class	Photo	Notes
Sea-based X-band Radar (formerly Moss Sirius)	(SBX-1)	n/a		Mobile active electronically scanned array early-warning radar station, based on a twin-hulled semi-submersible drilling rig. ("Sea-based X-band Radar" is more of a designation than a traditional name)
Ocean Surveillance (T-AGOS)
Name	Hull No.	Class	Photo	Notes
USNS Victorious	(T-AGOS-19)	Victorious		To be removed from service 2026
USNS Able	(T-AGOS-20)	Victorious		
USNS Effective	(T-AGOS-21)	Victorious		
USNS Loyal	(T-AGOS-22)	Victorious		
USNS Impeccable	(T-AGOS-23)	Impeccable		
Submarine and Special Warfare Support (T-AGSE)
Name	Hull No.	Class	Photo	Notes
MV C Champion		n/a		
MV C Commando		n/a		
MV C Ocean Trader		n/a		
MV Malama		n/a		
MV Delores Chouest		n/a		
MV HOS Dominator		n/a		
USNS Black Powder	(T-AGSE-1)	Black Powder		
USNS Westwind	(T-AGSE-2)	Black Powder		
USNS Eagleview	(T-AGSE-3)	Black Powder		
USNS Arrowhead	(T-AGSE-4)	Black Powder		
Prepositioning Program (PM3)
Air Force Container (T-AK)
Name	Hull No.	Class	Photo	Notes
MV Maj. Bernard F. Fisher	(T-AK-4396)	LTC Calvin P. Titus		Container ship
MV Capt. David I. Lyon	(T-AK-5362)	n/a		Container ship
Dry Cargo/Ammunition (T-AKE)
Name	Hull No.	Class	Photo	Notes
USNS Lewis and Clark	(T-AKE-1)	Lewis and Clark		RO/RO (Vehicle Cargo Ship)
USNS Sacagawea	(T-AKE-2)	Lewis and Clark		RO/RO (Vehicle Cargo Ship)
High-Speed Transport (HST)
Name	Hull No.	Class	Photo	Notes
USNS Guam	(T-HST-1)	Guam		
Unnamed (ex-Puerto Rico)	(HST-2)	Puerto Rico		Contracted out to a civilian ferry service as of March 2016, photo is current livery
Large, Medium-Speed Roll-on/Roll-off (LMSR) - (T-AKR)
Name	Hull No.	Class	Photo	Notes
USNS Red Cloud	(T-AKR-313)	Watson		
USNS Charlton	(T-AKR-314)	Watson		
USNS Watkins	(T-AKR-315)	Watson		
USNS Pomeroy	(T-AKR-316)	Watson		
USNS Soderman	(T-AKR-317)	Watson		
Maritime Prepositioning Force - Container, Roll-on/roll-off (RO/RO) - (T-AK), (T-AKR)
Name	Hull No.	Class	Photo	Notes
USNS PFC Dewayne T. Williams	(T-AK-3009)	2nd Lt. John P. Bobo		Dry Cargo/Ammunition
USNS 1st Lt. Baldomero Lopez	(T-AK-3010)	2nd Lt. John P. Bobo		Dry Cargo/Ammunition
USNS 1st Lt. Jack Lummus	(T-AK-3011)	2nd Lt. John P. Bobo		Dry Cargo/Ammunition
USNS Sgt. William R. Button	(T-AK-3012)	2nd Lt. John P. Bobo		Dry Cargo/Ammunition
USNS GySgt. Fred W. Stockham	(T-AK-3017)	Shughart		RO/RO (Vehicle Cargo Ship)
USNS Seay	(T-AKR-302)	Bob Hope		RO/RO (Vehicle Cargo Ship)
USNS Pililaau	(T-AKR-304)	Bob Hope		RO/RO (Vehicle Cargo Ship)
USNS Sisler	(T-AKR-311)	Watson		RO/RO (Vehicle Cargo Ship)
USNS Dahl	(T-AKR-312)	Watson		RO/RO (Vehicle Cargo Ship)
Offshore Petroleum Distribution System (T-AG)
Name	Hull No.	Class	Photo	Notes
USNS VADM K. R. Wheeler	(T-AG-5001)	VADM K. R. Wheeler		
USNS Fast Tempo		n/a		Crew boat/support vessel for VADM K. R. Wheeler
Aviation Logistics Support Ship (T-AVB)^{A}
Name	Hull No.	Class	Photo	Notes
SS Wright	(T-AVB-3)	Wright		(Prepositioning)
SS Curtiss	(T-AVB-4)	Wright		(Prepositioning)
^{A}Note: Aviation Logistics Support Ships are not listed in the above graphic, but are assigned to this program
Service Support Program (PM4)
Fleet Ocean Tug (T-ATF)
Name	Hull No.	Class	Photo	Notes
USNS Catawba	(T-ATF-168)	Powhatan		To be removed from service 2023
Hospital (T-AH)
Name	Hull No.	Class	Photo	Notes
USNS Mercy	(T-AH-19)	Mercy		
USNS Comfort	(T-AH-20)	Mercy		
Rescue and Salvage (T-ARS)
Name	Hull No.	Class	Photo	Notes
USNS Grasp	(T-ARS-51)	Safeguard		To be removed from service 2023
USNS Salvor	(T-ARS-52)	Safeguard		To be removed from service 2024
Submarine Tender (AS)
Name	Hull No.	Class	Photo	Notes
USS Emory S. Land	(AS-39)	Emory S. Land		
USS Frank Cable	(AS-40)	Emory S. Land		
Sealift Program (PM5)
Dry Cargo (T-AK)
Name	Hull No.	Class	Photo	Notes
MV TransAtlantic	(T-AK-5229)	n/a		
T/B Sea Eagle	(MB 1219)	n/a		
Surge Sealift - Large, Medium-Speed Roll-on/Roll-off (LMSR) and Roll-on/Roll-off (RO/RO) - (T-AK), (T-AKR)
Name	Hull No.	Class	Photo	Notes
USNS Bob Hope	(T-AKR-300)	Bob Hope		
USNS Fisher	(T-AKR-301)	Bob Hope		
Long-term Charter Tankers (T-AOT)
Name	Hull No.	Class	Photo	Notes
MT Empire State	(T-AOT-5193)	n/a		
MT Maersk Peary	(T-AOT-5246)	n/a		
ATB Galveston/Petrochem Producer	(T-AOT-5406)	n/a		
MT SLNC Pax	(T-AOT-5356)	n/a		
Petroleum Tankers (T5) (T-AOT)
Name	Hull No.	Class	Photo	Notes
USNS Lawrence H. Gianella	(T-AOT-1125)	Champion		
Fleet Ordnance and Dry Cargo Program (PM6)
Dry Cargo/Ammunition (T-AKE)
Name	Hull No.	Class	Photo	Notes
USNS Alan Shepard	(T-AKE-3)	Lewis and Clark		
USNS Richard E. Byrd	(T-AKE-4)	Lewis and Clark		
USNS Robert E. Peary	(T-AKE-5)	Lewis and Clark		
USNS Amelia Earhart	(T-AKE-6)	Lewis and Clark		
USNS Carl Brashear	(T-AKE-7)	Lewis and Clark		
USNS Wally Schirra	(T-AKE-8)	Lewis and Clark		
USNS Matthew Perry	(T-AKE-9)	Lewis and Clark		
USNS Charles Drew	(T-AKE-10)	Lewis and Clark		
USNS Washington Chambers	(T-AKE-11)	Lewis and Clark		
USNS William McLean	(T-AKE-12)	Lewis and Clark		
USNS Medgar Evers	(T-AKE-13)	Lewis and Clark		
USNS Cesar Chavez	(T-AKE-14)	Lewis and Clark		
Fast combat support (T-AOE)
Name	Hull No.	Class	Photo	Notes
USNS Supply	(T-AOE-6)	Supply		
USNS Arctic	(T-AOE-8)	Supply		
Afloat Staging Command Support Program (PM7)
Command (LCC)
Name	Hull No.	Class	Photo	Notes
USS Mount Whitney	(LCC-20)	Blue Ridge		Amphibious command ship
Expeditionary Transfer Dock (T-ESD)^{B}
Name	Hull No.	Class	Photo	Notes
USNS Montford Point	(T-ESD-1)	Montford Point		Active, Reduced Operating Status
USNS John Glenn	(T-ESD-2)	Montford Point		Active, Reduced Operating Status
^{B}Note: The Montfort Point-class has a sub-class of Expeditionary Mobile Base ships that have all since been commissioned and are operated by the Navy as United States Ships (USS).
Cable Laying/Repair (T-ARC)
Name	Hull No.	Class	Photo	Notes
USNS Zeus	(T-ARC-7)	Zeus		
Expeditionary Fast Transport Program (PM8)
Expeditionary Fast Transport (T-EPF)
Name	Hull No.	Class	Photo	Notes
USNS Trenton	(T-EPF-5)	Spearhead		
USNS Brunswick	(T-EPF-6)	Spearhead		
USNS Carson City	(T-EPF-7)	Spearhead		
USNS Yuma	(T-EPF-8)	Spearhead		
USNS City of Bismarck	(T-EPF-9)	Spearhead		
USNS Burlington	(T-EPF-10)	Spearhead		
USNS Puerto Rico	(T-EPF-11)	Spearhead		
USNS Newport	(T-EPF-12)	Spearhead		
USNS Apalachicola	(T-EPF-13)	Spearhead		
USNS Cody	(T-EPF-14)	Spearhead		
USNS Point Loma	(T-EPF-15)	Spearhead		under construction
USNS Lansing	(T-EPF-16)	Spearhead		under construction

== Previous MSC Ships ==
- USNS 1st Lt. Harry L. Martin (T-AK-3015)
- MV A1C William H. Pitsenbarger (T-AK-4638)
- USNS Apache (T-ATF-172)
- MV Alatna (T-AOT-81)
- SS Algol (T-AKR-287)
- SS Altair (T-AKR-291)
- MV American Tern (T-AK-4729)
- SS Antares (T-AKR-294)
- USNS Assurance (T-AGOS-5)
- MV Atlantic Freighter
- USNS Audacious (T-AGOS-11)
- MV Baffin Strait (T-AK W9519)
- SS Beaver State (T-ACS-10)
- USNS Bellatrix (T-AKR-288)
- USNS Benavidez
- USNS Bridge (T-AOE-10)
- USNS Brittin (T-AKR-305)
- USNS Capable (T-AGOS-16)
- SS Cape Cod
- SS Cape Fear (T-AK-5061)
- SS Cape Florida (AK-5071)
- SS Cape Jacob (T-AK-5029)
- SS Cape Johnson (T-AK-5075)
- SS Cape Juby (T-AK-5077)
- MV Cape Lambert (T-AKR-5077)
- MV Cape Lobos (T-AKR-5078)
- SS Cape Mendocino (T-AKR-5064)
- SS Cape Nome (T-AKR-1014)
- USNS Capella (T-AKR-293)
- MV Capt. Steven L. Bennett (T-AK-4296)
- MV Carolyn Chouest
- MV Chattahoochee (T-AOT-82)
- SS Chesapeake (AOT-5084)
- USNS Choctaw County (T-EPF-2)
- SS Comet (T-AKR-7)
- MV Cory Chouest
- USNS Denebola (T-AKR-289)
- SS Diamond State (T-ACS-7)
- MV SSG Edward A. Carter, Jr.
- SS Empire State (T-AP-1001)
- MT Evergreen State (T-AOT-5205)
- USNS Fall River
- USNS Flint (T-AE-32)
- USNS Gilliland (T-AKR-298)
- USNS Gordon (T-AKR-296)
- USNS Grapple (T-ARS-53)
- USNS Harkness (T-AGS-32)
- USNS Hayes (T-AG-195)
- USNS 2nd Lt. John P. Bobo
- USNS John McDonnell (T-AGS-51)
- MV LTC John U.D. Page
- MV Kellie Chouest
- USNS Kiska (T-AE-35)
- USNS LCPL Roy M. Wheat (T-AK-3016)
- USNS Maj. Stephen W. Pless (T-AK-3007)
- USNS Sgt. Matej Kocak (T-AK-3005)
- USNS Maury (T-AGS-39)
- USNS Mendonca (T-AKR-303)
- MV Megan Beyel
- USNS Millinocket (T-EPF-3)
- MV Mohegan (T-AK-5158)
- USNS Navajo (T-ATF-169)
- USNS Observation Island (T-AGM-23)
- USNS Paul Buck (T-AOT-1122)
- SS Petersburg (T-AOT-9101)
- MV PFC James Anderson Jr. (T-AK 3002)
- MV PFC William B. Baugh (T-AK-3001)
- USNS Pollux (T-AKR-290)
- USNS Rainier (T-AOE-7)
- USNS Regulus (T-AKR-292)
- USNS Richard G. Matthiesen (T-AOT-1124)
- USNS Safeguard (T-ARS-50)
- USNS Samuel L. Cobb (T-AOT-1123)
- USNS San Jose (T-AFS-7)
- USNS Shasta (T-AE-33)
- USNS Shughart (T-AKR-295)
- USNS Sioux (T-ATF-171)
- USNS Spearhead (T-EPF-1)
- USNS Sumner (T-AGS-61)
- HSV-2 Swift
- MV Transpacific (T-1)
- USNS Walter S. Diehl (T-AO-193)
- USNS Watson (T-AKR-310)
- MV Westpac Express (HSV-4676) (charter with US Navy ended January 2018)
- USNS Yano (T-AKR-297)

== See also ==
- Strategic Sealift Ships
- National Defense Reserve Fleet
- Ready Reserve Force ships
- United States Maritime Administration
- United States Federal Maritime Commission
- Naval Inactive Ship Maintenance Facility
