= Explorer-class surveillance ship =

US military vessel

Class overview
- Name: Explorer class
- Builders: Austal USA, Mobile, Alabama
- Operators: United States Navy
- Preceded by: Impeccable class
- Cost: US$789.6 million for first ship (FY2025); US$3.2 billion for 7 ships (FY2023)
- Planned: 7
- Building: 0
- Completed: 0
- Canceled: 0
- Active: 0

General characteristics
- Displacement: 8,500 tons
- Length: 356 ft (109 m)
- Crew: 68
- Sensors & processing systems: SURTASS passive and active low frequency sonar arrays

The Explorer-class ocean surveillance ship is a planned class of United States Navy special mission-support ship. Also known as the T-AGOS 25 program, the ships are planned to replace five other ocean surveillance ships and is speculated to be in response to modernized submarines from Russia and China. The ships will be SWATH catamarans, and carry SURTASS towed array sonar for anti-submarine warfare, as well as collecting acoustic data for the IUSS submarine detection system.

== History ==
On 18 May 2023, the Navy awarded US$3.2 billion to the Austal USA shipyard in Mobile, Alabama to construct seven Explorer-class vessels. On May 30, 2024, the Navy awarded an additional $516 million to account for cost growth on the procurement of the first ship. On 10 January 2025, Secretary of the Navy Carlos Del Toro named the first two ships the USNS Don Walsh (T-AGOS 25) and the USNS Victor Vescovo (T-AGOS 26) after undersea explorers Don Walsh and Victor Vescovo, both of whom dove to the deepest known point on Earth's seabed, Challenger Deep.

== Similar ship classes ==
The Explorer class is similar in construction to the earlier Victorious and the Impeccable-class ocean surveillance ships, with all three classes of ship using SWATH type hulls. The Explorer class is designed to replace both classes of ship.
