= MV Maria Reina =

Panamanian container ship

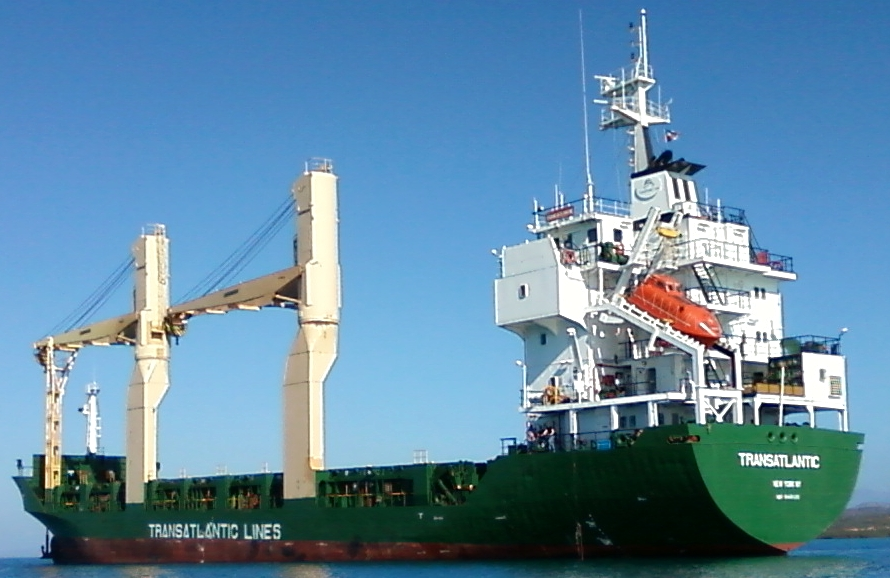
- Motor Vessel MARIA REINA

History

Panama
- Name: 2022–present: Maria Reina; 2009–2022: TransAtlantic; 2004–2009: Baffin Strait (T-AK W9519)
- Owner
- Operator
- Port of registry: Panama
- Launched: 28 May 1996
- Identification: IMO number: 9148520; MMSI number: 366997520; Callsign: WDC2769
- Status: In active service

Antigua and Barbuda
- Name: Baffin Strait
- Owner: Rehder & Arkon
- Port of registry: Antigua and Barbuda
- Identification: IMO number: 9148520

Singapore
- Name: 2001–2004 Steamers Future, 2000–2001 Stl Future, 2000–2000 Steamers Future, 1998–2000 Mekong Star, 1998–1998 Steamers Future, 1997–1998 Eagle Faith, 1997–1997 Steamers Future.
- Owner: Keppel Corporation
- Operator: Keppel Corporation
- Port of registry: Singapore
- Builder: Wuhu Xinlian Shipbuilding Co. Ltd.
- Laid down: 8 February 1996
- Launched: 28 May 1996
- Completed: 25 February 1997
- Identification: IMO number: 9148520

General characteristics
- Class & type: feeder
- Tonnage: 4,276 GT; 5,055 tonnes deadweight (DWT),
- Displacement: 8,299 long tons
- Length: 100.59 m (330.0 ft)
- Beam: 16.24 m (53.3 ft)
- Draft: 8.2 m (26.9 ft)
- Installed power: 3 Wärtsilä UD25L655D diesels
- Propulsion: Wärtsilä 9F32E diesel, controllable-pitch propeller, tunnel-type bow thruster.
- Speed: 13 kts
- Capacity: 384 twenty-foot equivalent units (TEU).
- Crew: 13

MV Maria Reina is a Panamanian feeder container ship. The 100-metre (330 ft) long ship was built at Wuhu Shipyard in Wuhu, China in 1997 as Steamers Future. Originally owned by Singapore's Keppel Corporation, she has had three owners, been registered under three flags, and been renamed ten times.

From 2004 to 2009, the ship, under the name Baffin Strait (T-AK W9519), was one of Military Sealift Command's seven chartered container ships, and delivered 250 containers every month from Singapore to Diego Garcia. During this charter, she carried everything from fresh food to building supplies to aircraft parts, delivering more than 200,000 tons of cargo to the island each year. After finishing the Diego Garcia contract, the ship sailed from Singapore on 19 November 2009 for a shipyard period in Wilmington, North Carolina by way of the Suez Canal. In May 2010, she was towed to Ciramar Shipyard in the Dominican Republic for more extensive repairs. She then entered commercial service as the TransAtlantic, being renamed MV Maria Reina in May 2019.

== Construction ==
Then named Steamer's Future, the ship's keel was laid on 8 February 1996 at Wuhu Shipyard in Wuhu, China. Its hull, constructed from ordinary strength steel, has an overall length of 100.59 metres (330.0 ft). In terms of width, the ship has a beam of 16.24 metres (53.3 ft). The height from the top of the keel to the main deck, called the moulded depth, is 8.2 metres (27 ft).

Although much of its career has been spent crossing oceans, the ship's container-carrying capacity of 384 twenty-foot equivalent units (TEU) (384 20-foot shipping containers) places it in the range of a small feeder ship. The ship's gross tonnage, a measure of the volume of all its enclosed spaces, is 4,276. Its net tonnage, which measures the volume of the cargo spaces, is 2,129. Its total carrying capacity in terms of weight, is 5,055 long tons deadweight (DWT), the equivalent of almost 170 Sherman tanks.

Steamer's Future was built with a Wärtsilä Vasa 9R32E main engine which drives a controllable-pitch propeller. This is a four-stroke diesel engine, that is turbocharged and intercooled. This engine also features direct fuel injection. It has nine in-line cylinders, each with a 320 mm cylinder bore, and a 350 mm stroke. At 720 revolutions per minute (RPM), the engine produces a maximum continuous output of 3,645 kilowatts (4,888 hp), and at 750 RPM 3,690 kilowatts (4,950 hp). According to Military Sealift Command, the ship's cruising speed is 13 knots (24 km/h; 15 mph).

In addition, the ship has a Schottel SST170LKT maneuvering thruster.

The ship was built with two 400-kilowatt (540 hp) Wärtsilä UD 25 L6 55D auxiliary generators, backed-up by a Cummins emergency diesel generator. At some point prior to 21 April 2011, the #2 ship's service diesel generator was replaced with a Caterpillar C-18 diesel generator. This unit runs between 1,500 and 1,800 RPM and supplies between 301 and 602 kilowatts of electrical power. It burns between 16.6 to 38.3 US gallons (63 to 145 L; 13.8 to 31.9 imp gal) per hour of diesel fuel and weighs between 3,900 pounds (1,800 kg) and 4,200 pounds (1,900 kg). This generator has a 145-millimetre (5.7 in) bore and a 183-millimetre (7.2 in) stroke.

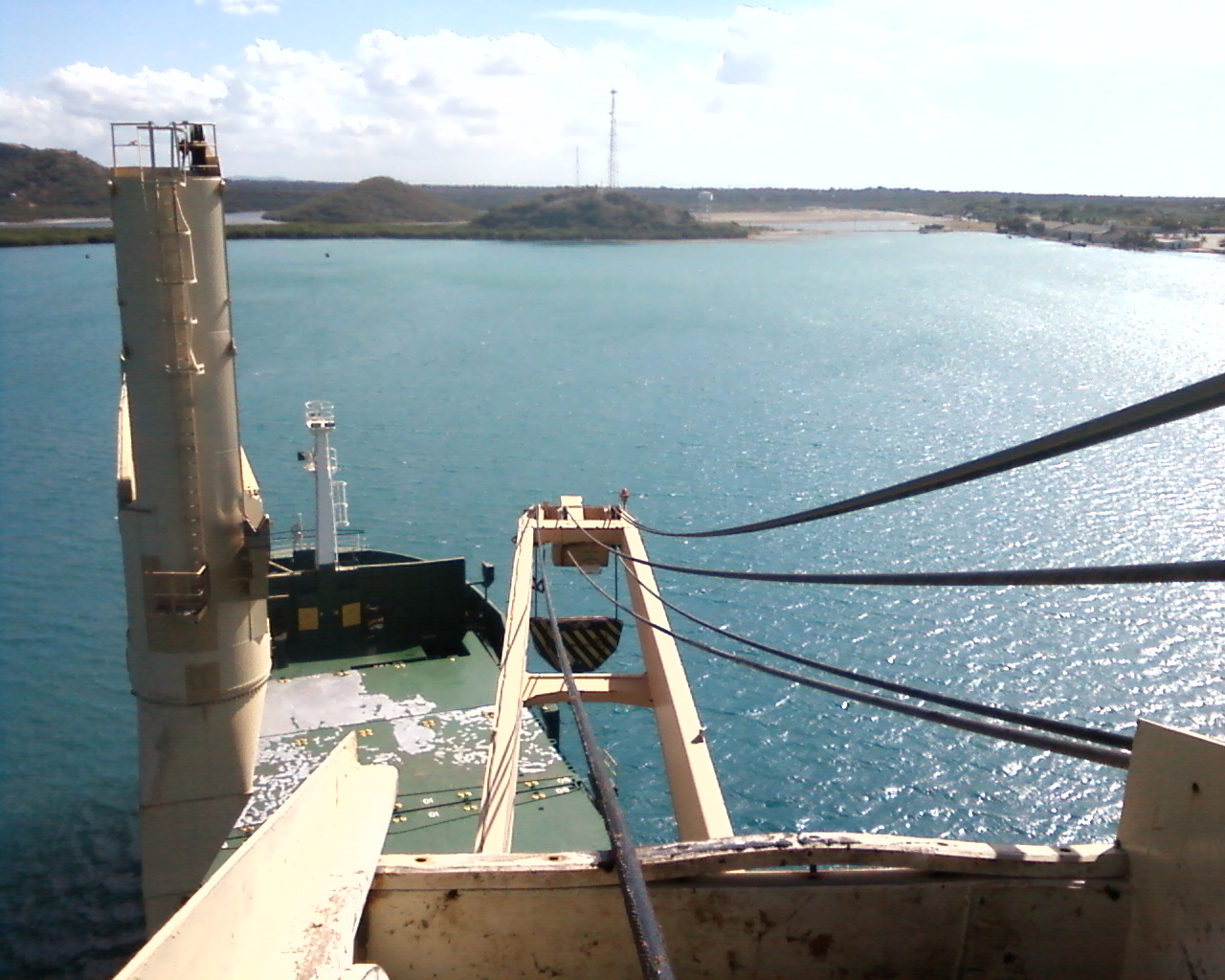
View from the top of Maria Reina's aft cargo crane.

TransAtlantic has two Liebherr rotary cargo cranes. Ships with cranes, known as geared ships, are more flexible in that they can visit ports that are not equipped with pierside cranes. However, having cranes on board also has drawbacks. This added flexibility incurs some costs greater recurring expenses, such as maintenance and fuel costs. The United Nations Council on Trade and Development characterizes geared ships as a "niche market only appropriate for those ports where low cargo volumes do not justify investment in port cranes or where the public sector does not have the financial resources for such investment." Slightly less than a third of the ships in Maria Reina's size range (from 100 to 499 TEU) are geared.

Construction of the ship was completed in 1997. As of 2011, the ship is classified by Det Norske Veritas with the code "1A1 General Cargo Carrier Container E0", meaning that it was constructed under the supervision of a recognized classification society, that the construction complies with the society's rules, that it is classed as a general cargo carrier and container ship, and that it is designed to be operated with unattended machinery spaces.

== History ==
=== Under the Singaporean flag ===
In 1983, Singapore's Keppel Corporation acquired one of Singapore's oldest shipping concerns, the Straits Steamship Company, founded in 1890. After the acquisition, Keppel renamed the company Steamers Maritime Holdings Company. The company laid the keel for Steamer's Future on 8 February 1996, but as early as 1997, the Keppel conglomerate began to exit the shipping industry. Shortly thereafter, Steamers was renamed Keppel Telecommunications & Transportation, and in March 2004, Keppel announced the sale of "the entire Steamers fleet of 10 ships to Interorient for $90.9m in order to concentrate on core activities."

Interorient kept seven of these ships for its Mediterranean-based United Feeder Services operation, but sold Steamers Future and two other ships to Hamburg-based shipowner Rehder & Arkon, a division of the Carsten Rehder company. In April 2004, Rehder & Arkon renamed the ship Baffin Strait, and chartered her for six months to Mariana Express Lines. In late October 2004, Rehder & Arkon sold the ship to the U.S. company TransAtlantic Lines for US$6.3 million.

=== Under the United States flag ===
As of 2011, the ship is owned and operated by TransAtlantic Lines, an American shipping company based in Greenwich, Connecticut. This limited liability company was founded in 1998 by vice-president Gudmundur Kjaernested and president Brandon C. Rose. The company owns and operates five vessels, including one tug-and-barge combination. Four of these vessels are currently or have been chartered by the Military Sealift Command, and perform duties such as delivering cargo to the U.S. military base in Guantanamo Bay, Cuba and oil products to bases in the Western Pacific. TransAtlantic Lines has no collective bargaining agreements with seagoing unions.

==== Diego Garcia charter ====
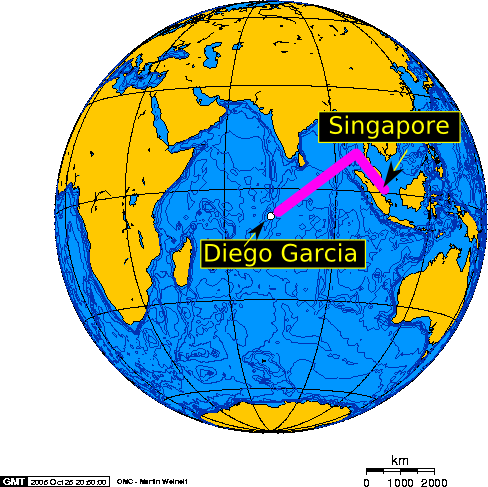
From 2004 to 2009, MV Baffin Strait transited between Singapore and Diego Garcia once a month.

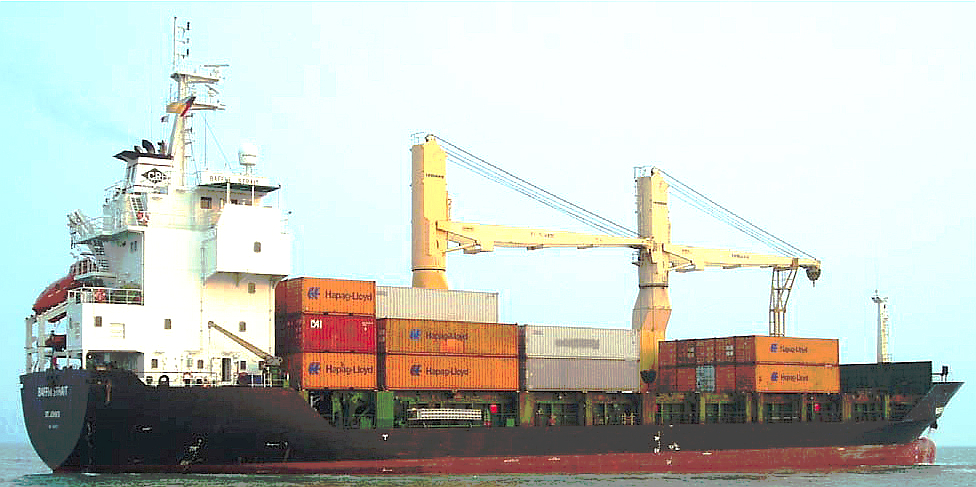
Baffin Strait during the MSC charter.

In 2004, TransAtlantic Lines outbid Sealift Incorporated for the contract to haul cargo between Singapore and Diego Garcia. The route had previously been serviced by Sealift's MV Sagamore which was crewed by members of American Maritime Officers and Seafarer's International Union. TransAtlantic Lines reportedly won the contract by approximately 10 percent, representing a price difference of about $2.7 million.

As a result of winning this contract, the US Navy gave the Baffin Strait the hull classification symbol T-AK W9519. The T-AK series symbol is given to the seven container ships chartered by MSC but owned and operated by contractors.

The Baffin Strait's Diego Garcia charter ran from 10 January 2005 to 30 September 2008 on a daily rate of $12,550 under contract number N00033-05-C-5500. Nicknamed "the DGAR shuttle", the ship delivered 250 containers each month from Singapore to Diego Garcia, carrying everything from fresh food to building supplies to aircraft parts, and delivering more than 200,000 tons of cargo to the island each year." When returning from Diego Garcia, the ship carried metal waste to be recycled in Singapore.

The Sealift Program Office's function is to provide ocean transportation for the Department of Defense and other U.S. government agencies. The program is divided into three project offices: Tankers, Dry Cargo, and Surge. Dry cargo is shipped by U.S.-flagged commercial ships. Approximately 80 percent of this cargo is transported aboard regularly scheduled U.S. commercial ocean liners. The other 20 percent is carried by four cargo ships under charter to MSC.

On the evening of 22 April 2009, Baffin Strait was involved with a collision with the car carrier Jasmine Ace while both vessels were anchored in Singapore. A severe squall moved into the area while Jasmine Ace was taking fuel. The squall caused the ship to drag its anchor. The car carrier drifted downwind, causing its starboard quarter to strike Baffin Strait's starboard side. As a result, Baffin Strait's anchor also began to drag, and the crew dropped a second anchor to hold the ship. The two ships were "married for several minutes", during which time the Jasmine Ace started her engine. The Baffin Strait's damage included "disfigured" steel on the starboard bulwark and damage to the starboard running light.

On 27 March 2009, Military Sealift Command announced a request for proposals (number N00033-09-R-5502) for the Diego Garcia service. The charter contract would be for a one-year probation period, followed by three one-year options, and concluding with an eleven-month option. The fixed-price time charter would be supplemented by reimbursements for costs such as the ship's fuel. The RFP stipulated that the charter would be awarded to the lowest-priced proposal which the Navy found technically acceptable.

Six companies submitted proposals, with TransAtlantic proposing the MV Rio Bogota (which it intended to rename Heidi B) to replace the Baffin Strait. While the Navy was assessing the proposals, rival shipping company Sealift Incorporated secured the rights to operate Rio Bogota, and TransAtlantic countered by altering its proposal to offer the ship MV LS Aizenshtat instead. The Navy deemed both companies' proposals technically acceptable and their past performance satisfactory. Sealift's proposed rate, was more than $3 million less than TransAtlantic's ($39,031,093 versus $42,415,356), and they were awarded the charter. After winning the contract, Sealift purchased Rio Bogota on 21 August 2009.

==== 2010–2011 shipyard period ====
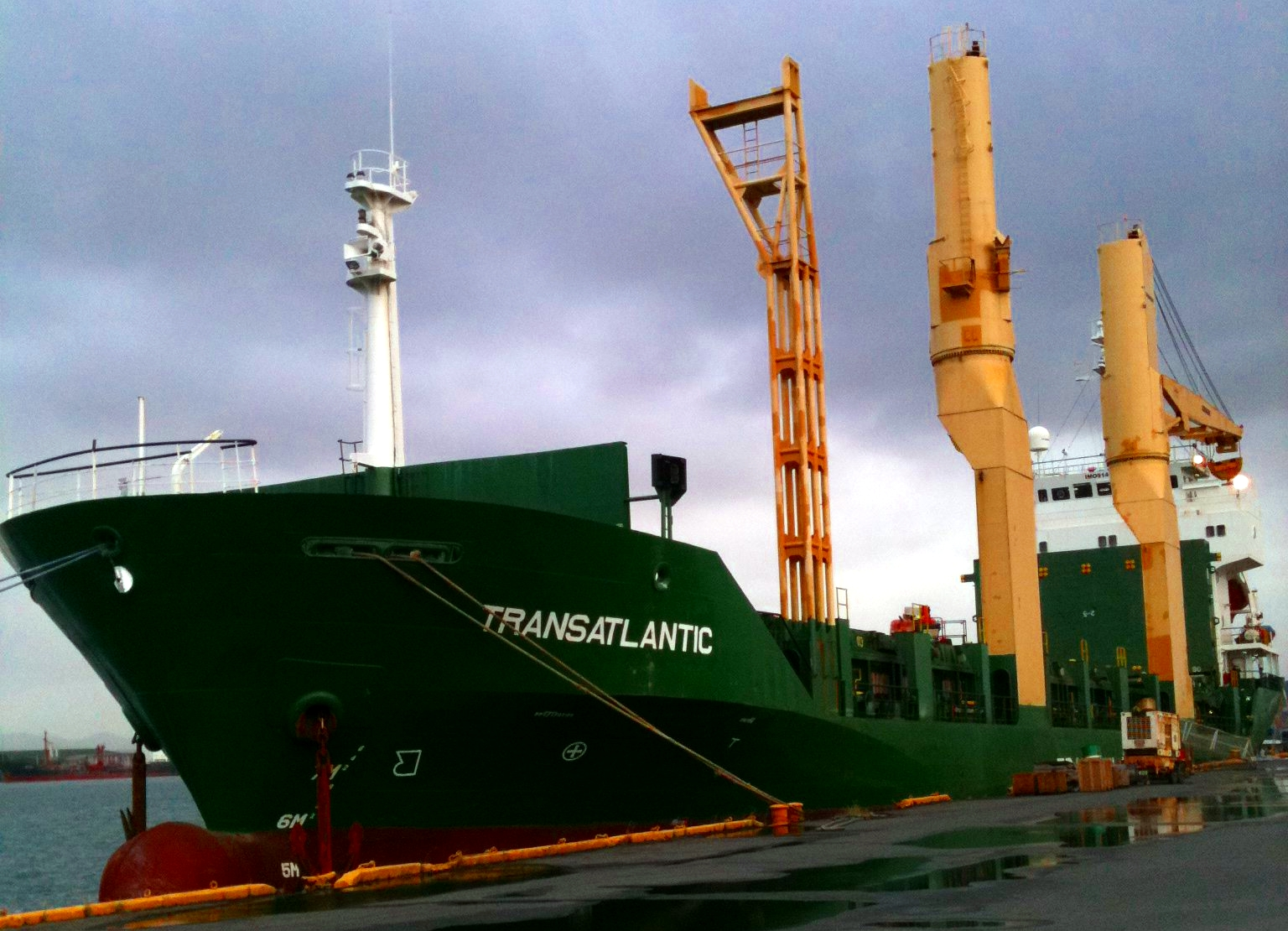
TransAtlantic pierside in San Juan, Puerto Rico, 2011.

After finishing the Diego Garcia contract, the ship sailed from Singapore on 19 November 2009 for a shipyard period in Wilmington, North Carolina by way of the Suez Canal.

On 16 January 2010, while pierside in Wilmington, the ship was picketed by members of the Seafarers International Union. According to the union's Assistant Vice President, Bryan Powell, crewmembers' "wages are substandard. They don't get any overtime. They are basically on salary, so they can work them 16 hours a day and get the same low rates of pay, which we think is ridiculous". The union claimed that the picket was in support of crewmembers, encouraging them to unionize the ship, and take their case to the Department of Labor.

On 31 March 2010, industry journal Tradewinds reported that Baffin Strait was the first vessel ever to be involuntarily disenrolled from the United States Coast Guard's Alternative Compliance Program, in which the Coast Guard delegates inspections and certificate issuance to the vessel's classification society. The move was prompted by deficiencies to the ship's firefighting and lifesaving programs reported by Coast Guard inspectors in Singapore remaining unresolved. According to the Coast Guard's program manager for domestic vessel inspections, inspectors "didn't see a pattern of improvement over time".

In May 2010, the ship was towed to Ciramar Shipyard in the Dominican Republic for more extensive repairs.

==== 2010 to present ====
In May 2019, the ship was renamed MV Maria Reina under the Peru Flag before being registered under the Panama flag registry in March 2022.

== See also ==
- List of Military Sealift Command ships
