= Ningyuan Dian Kun =

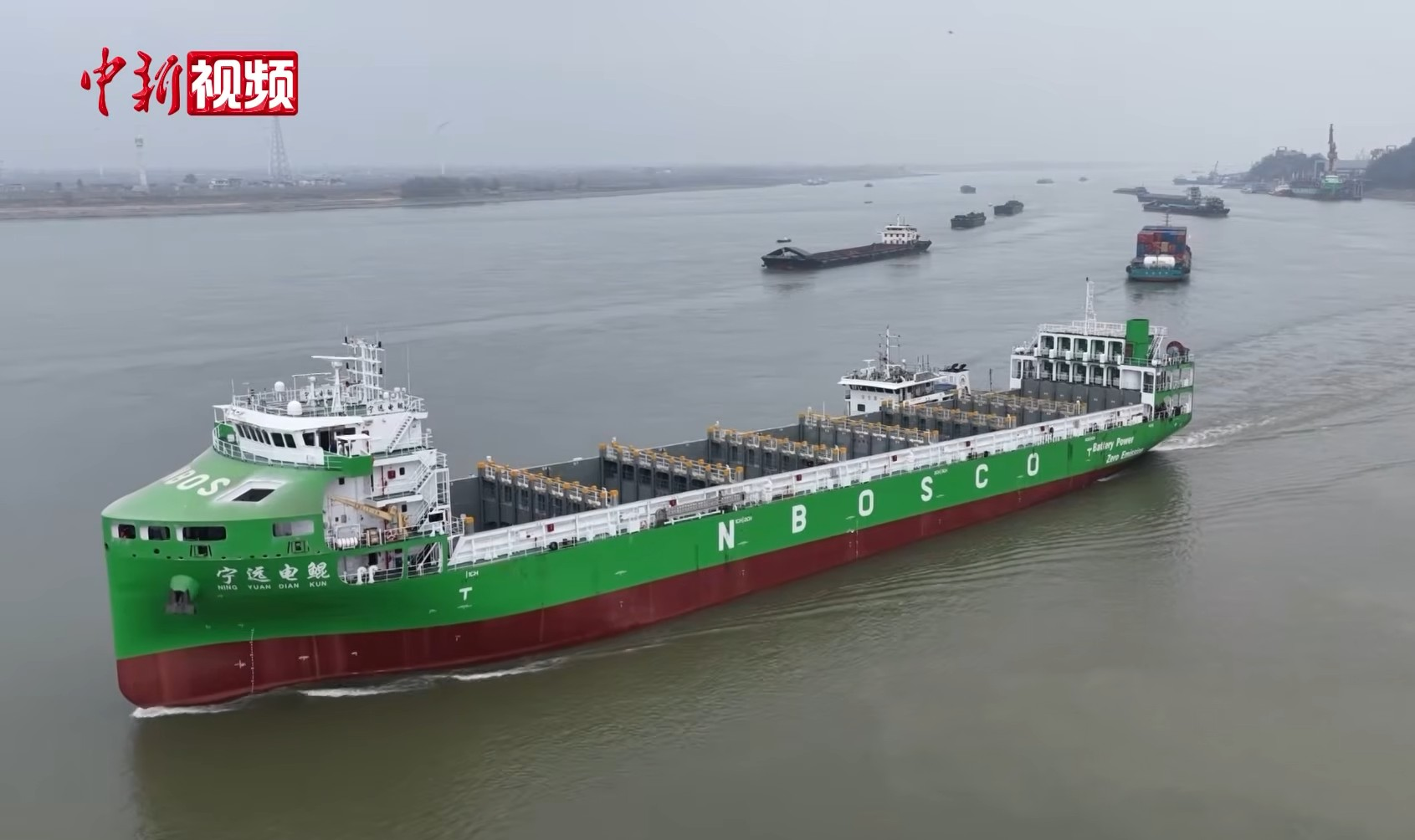
- Ningyuan Dian Kun in 2026

History
- Name: 宁远电鲲 (Ningyuan Dian Kun)
- Owner: Ningbo Ocean Shipping
- Port of registry: (China)
- Launched: September 2025
- Identification: MMSI number: 412408870; Callsign: BQKE7
- Status: In service

General characteristics
- Type: Container ship
- Tonnage: 10,000 GT
- Length: 127.8 m (419 ft 3 in)
- Beam: 21.6 m (70 ft 10 in)
- Draft: 6.2 m (20 ft 4 in)
- Propulsion: electric
- Capacity: 742 TEU

Ningyuan Dian Kun is a full-electric feeder container ship operated by Ningbo Ocean Shipping. It has a cargo capacity of 742 TEU.

The ship has a total battery capacity of 19,600 kWh, used to propel two 875 kW permanent magnet synchronous electric motors. The batteries can be recharged using high‑voltage shore power or by swapping the battery containers. For auxiliary power, the ship is equipped with solar panels.

The ship was launched in September 2025 and went into commercial service in April 2026, starting on the Ningbo-Zhoushan–Jiaxing Port route. Its sister ship Ningyuan Dian Peng is expected to start service in June of the same year.
