= USNS Loyal =

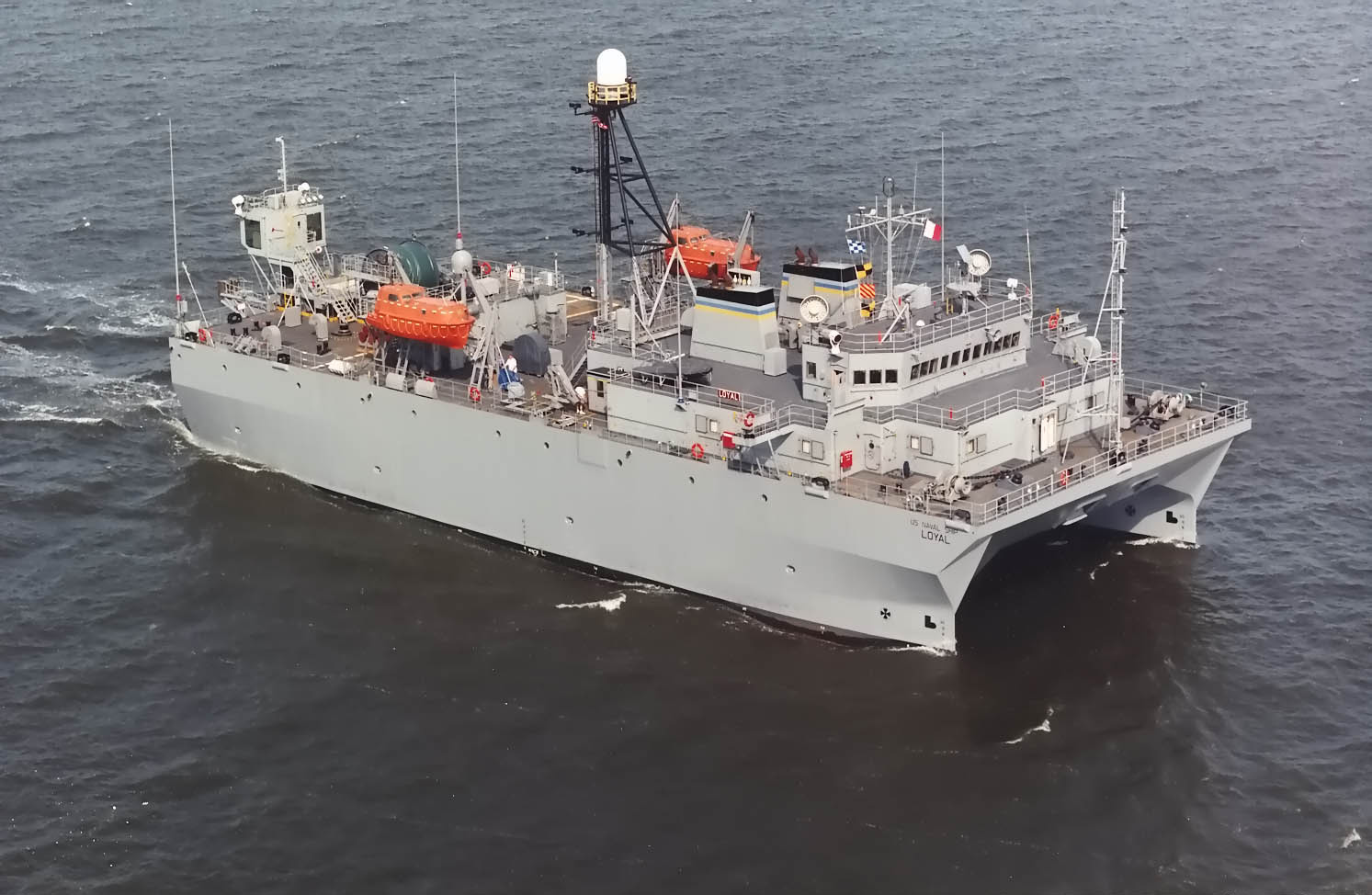
- USNS Loyal (T-AGOS-22)

History

United States
- Name: USNS Loyal
- Owner: Military Sealift Command
- Builder: Mc Dermott Shipyards, Morgan City, Louisiana
- Laid down: 7 October 1991
- Launched: 19 September 1992
- Acquired: by the U.S. Navy, 1 July 1993
- In service: as USNS Loyal (T-AGOS-22), date unknown
- Identification: IMO number: 8926640; MMSI number: 367835000; Callsign: NLYL
- Status: Currently in service

General characteristics
- Type: Victorious-class ocean surveillance ship
- Displacement: 3,100 tons light, 3,384 tons full load
- Length: 235 ft (72 m)
- Beam: 94 ft (29 m)
- Draft: 25 ft (7.6 m) (max)
- Propulsion: diesel-electric, two shafts, 1,600hp
- Speed: 9.6 knots (17.8 km/h; 11.0 mph)
- Complement: 19 civilian mariners, 6 sponsors, 0 Navy
- Sensors & processing systems: both passive and active low frequency sonar arrays
- Armament: none

USNS Loyal (T-AGOS-22) is a Victorious-class ocean surveillance ship acquired by the U.S. Navy in 1993 and assigned to the Navy's Special Missions Program.

== Built and Particulars ==
Loyal was built by Mc Dermott Shipyards, Morgan City, Louisiana. She was laid down on 7 October 1991 and launched 19 September 1992 and was delivered to the Navy on 1 July 1993 which assigned her to the Military Sealift Command (MSC) Special Missions Program.

Vessel particulars -

FPO AE 09577-4018

IMO Number : 8926640

Callsign : NLYL

MMSI : 367835000

== Mission ==
The mission of Loyal is to directly support the Navy by using passive sonar arrays to detect and track undersea threats.

== Operational history ==
The USNS Loyal used Sasebo as a base in 2011, and was deployed in the Pacific Ocean. She called Sasebo in January 2011 and Subic bay (Philippines) in April 2012

== Note ==
There is no journal entry on Loyal at DANFS.
