= Don Walsh =

American oceanographer (1931–2023)

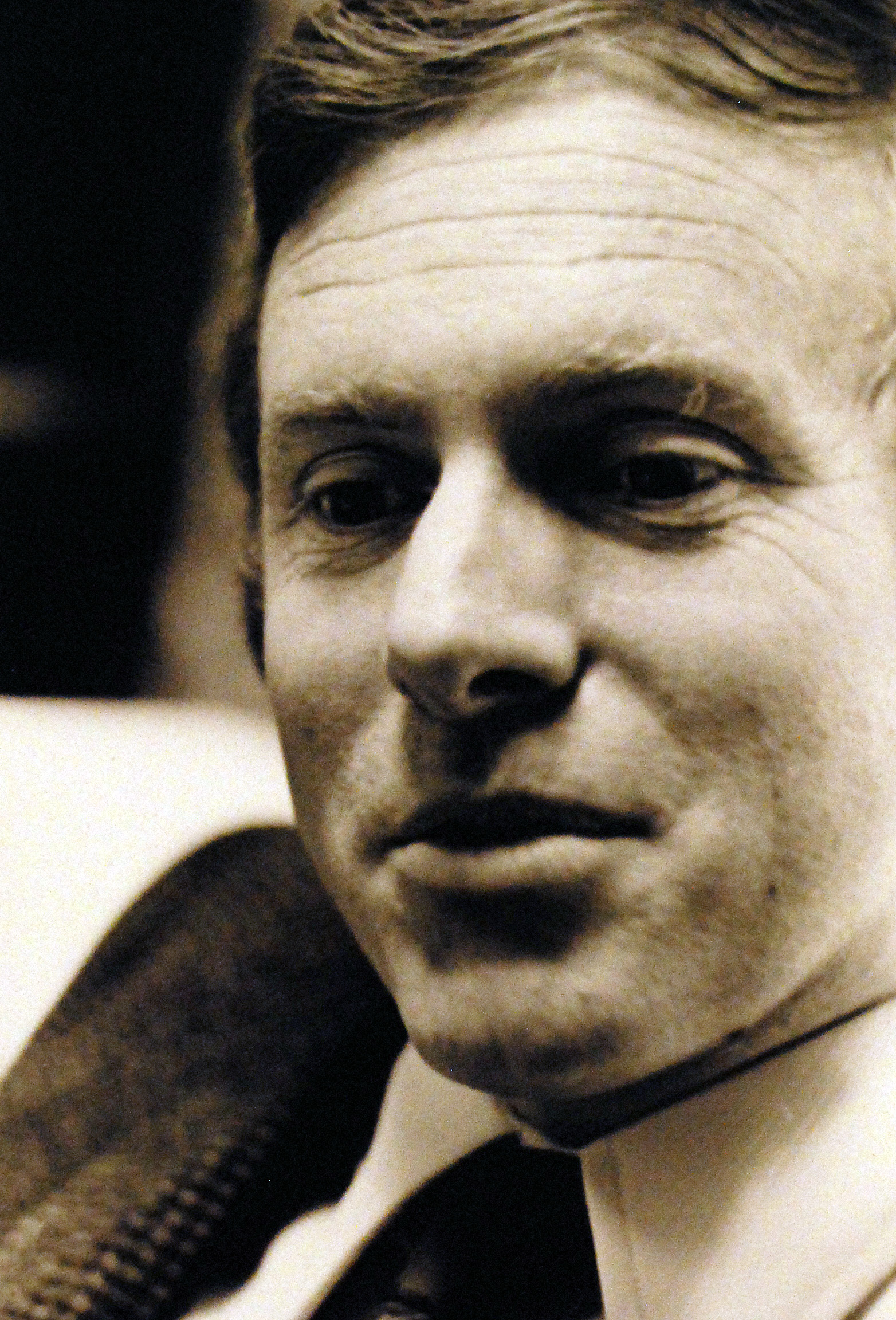
- Walsh in 1974
- Born: November 2, 1931; Berkeley, California, U.S.
- Died: November 12, 2023 (aged 92); Myrtle Point, Oregon, U.S.
- Education: United States Naval Academy; San Diego State University; Texas A&M University
- Known for: Trieste
- Awards: Hubbard Medal (2010)
- Scientific career
- Workplaces: United States Navy
- Military career
- Spouse: Joan Walsh (m. 1962)
- Children: 2
- Allegiance: United States
- Branch: United States Navy
- Service years: 1954–1978
- Rank: Captain
- Conflicts: Korean War; Vietnam War
- Awards: Distinguished Public Service Award; Hubbard Medal

Don Walsh (November 2, 1931 – November 12, 2023) was an American oceanographer, U.S. Navy officer, and marine policy specialist. While aboard the bathyscaphe Trieste, he and Jacques Piccard made a record maximum descent in the Challenger Deep on January 23, 1960, to 35,813 feet (10,916 m). Later and more accurate measurements have measured it at 35,798 feet (10,911 m).

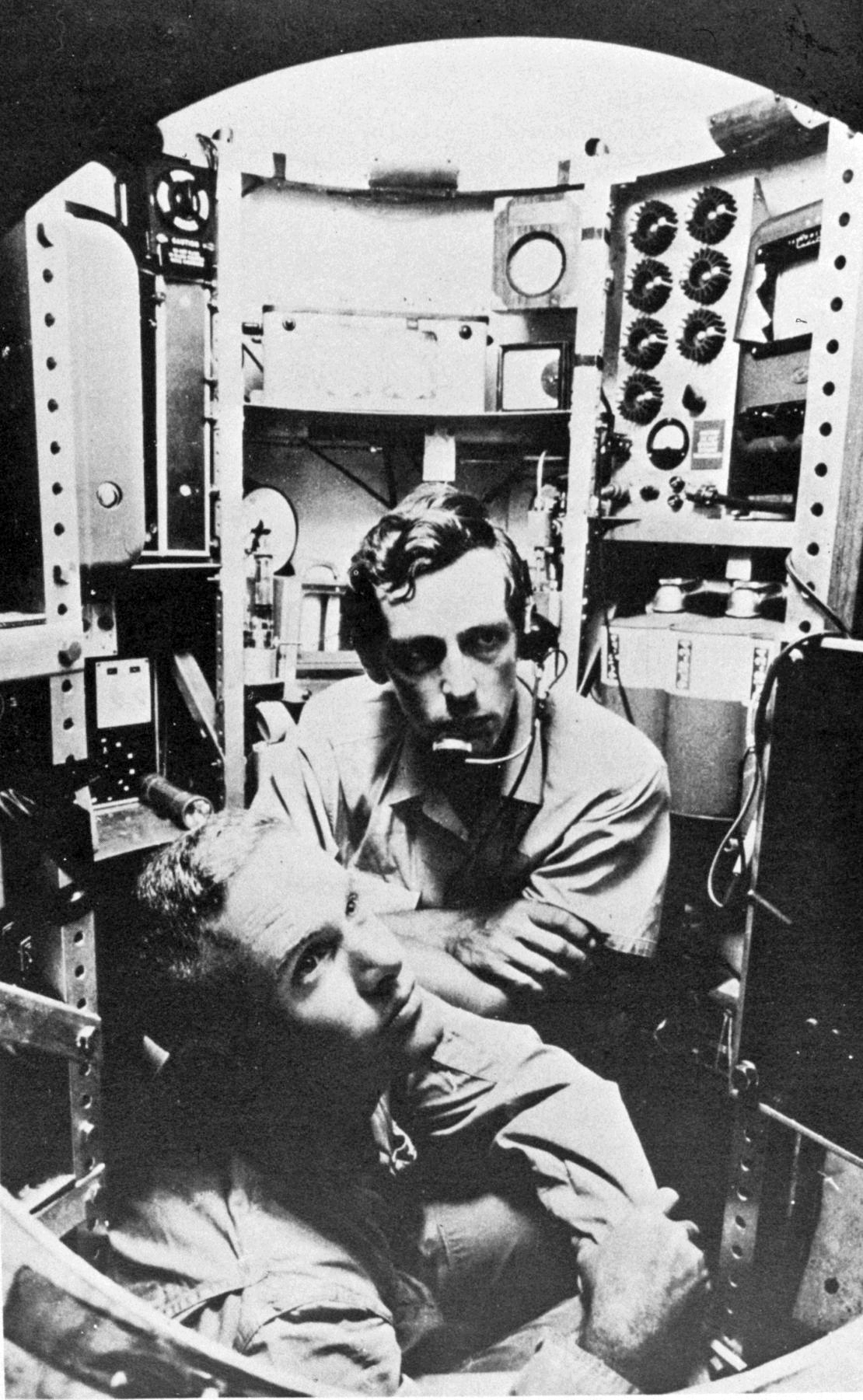
Lt. Don Walsh, USN (bottom) and Jacques Piccard (center) in the bathyscaphe Trieste

== Early life and education ==
Walsh was born in Berkeley, California on November 2, 1931. He graduated with a bachelor's degree in engineering from the U.S. Naval Academy in 1954, and later, a Master's degree in political science from San Diego State University, and a PhD in physical oceanography from Texas A&M University.

== Career ==
Walsh served 24 years in the U.S. Navy upon graduation from the Academy, spanning the Korean and Vietnam Wars. He served as a submarine officer and was a qualified Navy Diver.

He attained the rank of captain by the time he retired. He spent fifteen years at sea, mostly in submarines, where he served on the submarines Rasher (SSR-269), Sea Fox (SS-402), and Bugara (SS-331), and finally the Bashaw (SSKS 241), where he served as Commanding Officer, when he held the rank of lieutenant. He also worked with ocean-related research and development for the Navy.

Walsh was appointed as special assistant to the Assistant Secretary of the Navy for Research and Development from 1971 to 1972.

Serving as Dean of Marine Programs and Professor of Ocean Engineering at the University of Southern California, Walsh initiated and directed the university's Institute for Marine and Coastal Studies. In 1989, his company, International Maritime Incorporated, contracted a joint venture with the P.P. Shirshov Institute of Oceanology to establish an underwater maintenance company, Soyuz Marine Service, which continues to operate in the Russian Federation. Walsh continued to support ocean sciences in his work on the Ocean Sciences Board at the National Academy of Sciences.

He managed a marine consulting business beginning in 1976, and as of 2010 conducted about five deep-sea expeditions per year.

Walsh held a faculty appointment at Oregon State University in the College of Earth, Ocean, and Atmospheric Sciences.

It was reported in 2010 that Walsh visited the deep-sea submersible Jiaolong and its makers at the China Ship Scientific Research Center. The craft had "planted a Chinese flag on the bottom of the South China Sea during a two-mile-deep dive in June" as the Chinese program—which Walsh characterized as "very deliberate"—proceeded toward its ambitious goal of diving to 7,000 meters, or 4.35 miles, in 2012.

== Personal life ==
Walsh lived with his wife, Joan, in Sitkum, Oregon, on a ranch they bought in 1992. They had two children together. Walsh remained active with the National Academy of Sciences and the Ocean Elders organization.

Walsh was on-site to congratulate Victor Vescovo when he completed his own record-breaking series of dives in the Challenger Deep in 2019. In June 2020, Walsh's son Kelly dived to the bottom of Challenger Deep with Vescovo, becoming the eleventh person to reach the deepest point in the ocean.

Walsh died at his home in Myrtle Point, Oregon on November 12, 2023, at the age of 92.

== Media ==
Several months after Trieste made its successful exploration of Challenger Deep, Walsh appeared as himself on March 27, 1961 episode of the CBS game show To Tell the Truth.

Walsh visited the wreck of the RMS Titanic on board the submersible MIR 2 on 20 July 2001.

Walsh joined the team that oversaw the dive of the Deepsea Challenger mission, during which James Cameron dived solo to the bottom of the Challenger Deep, on March 26, 2012.

Walsh was the inspiration for Chris Wright's 2015 book No More Worlds to Conquer, and his interview constitutes the opening chapter. The book, about moving on from the defining moment in one's life, was inspired by Walsh's answer to Wright's question, "What came next after the Trieste dive?" Walsh responded, "Well, a lot of people think I died."

== Honors ==
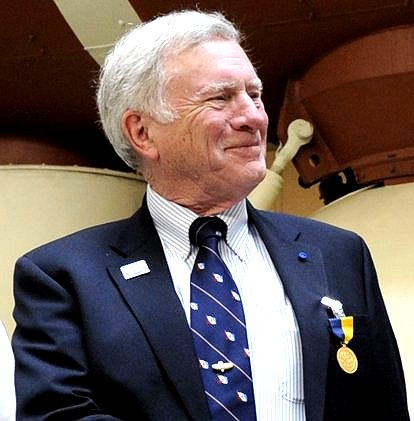
Walsh in 2010

Walsh was appointed by Presidents Carter and Reagan to the U.S. National Advisory Committee on Oceans and Atmosphere, was a member of the Law of the Sea Advisory Committee for the U.S. Department of State, and served as a member of the Marine Board of the U.S. National Research Council from 1990 to 1993.

In 2001, Walsh was elected to the National Academy of Engineering.

Walsh was named one of the world's great explorers by Life magazine.

On April 14, 2010, The National Geographic Society awarded its highest honor, the Hubbard Medal, to Walsh. The U.S. Navy awarded Walsh its Distinguished Public Service Award.

On September 22, 2020, The Marine Technology Society and The Society for Underwater Technology announced that the inaugural recipient of their new MTS/SUT Captain Don Walsh Award for Ocean Exploration was Edith Widder.

On January 10, 2025, Secretary of the Navy Carlos Del Toro announced the lead ship of the Explorer class of ocean surveillance ships will be named the USNS Don Walsh (T-AGOS 25) after Walsh. Walsh's spouse and daughter, Joan Walsh and Liz Walsh, were named ship sponsors.

== Awards and decorations ==
Recognitions include the following:

Navy Distinguished Public Service Award
Legion of Merit	Legion of Merit
Meritorious Service Medal	Meritorious Service Medal
Antarctica Service Medal

=== Legion of Merit citation ===

Citation:

The President of the United States of America takes pleasure in presenting a Gold Star in lieu of a Second Award of the Legion of Merit to Lieutenant Don Walsh, United States Navy, for exceptionally meritorious conduct in the performance of outstanding services from January 1959 to January 1960 as Officer-in-Charge of the Bathyscaph Trieste. Throughout this period, Lieutenant Walsh exercised marked professional skill and resourcefulness in carrying out an important assignment. During deep-diving operations in the Marianas Trench, he successfully completed a series of record-breaking dives, culminated by a dive to the unprecedented depth of 37,800 feet on 23 January 1960.

== See also ==
- List of people who descended to Challenger Deep
