= USNS Effective =

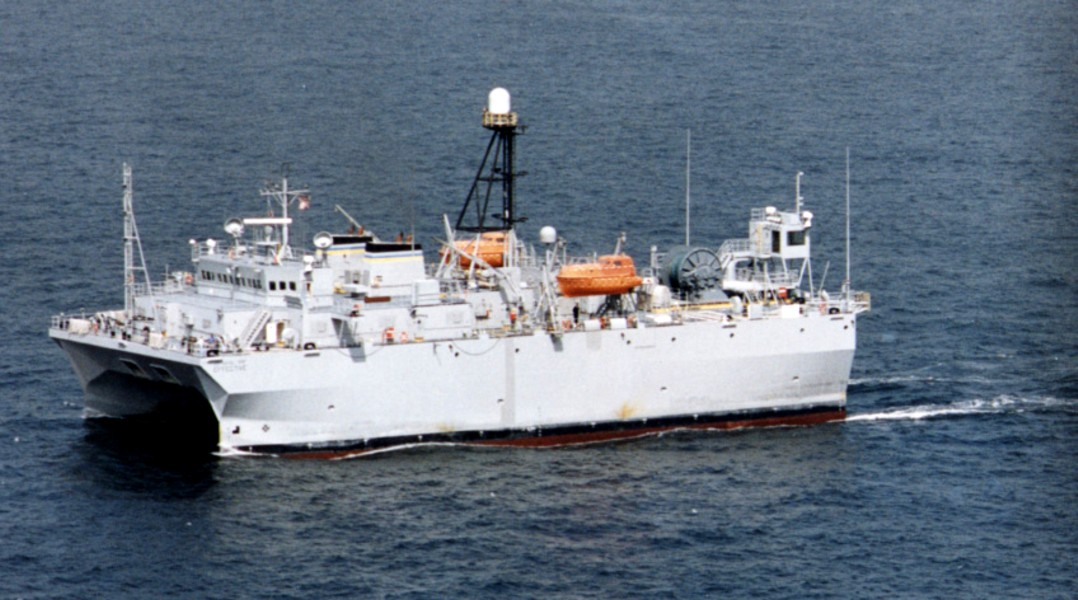
- USNS Effective (T-AGOS-21)

History

United States
- Name: USS Effective
- Operator: United States Navy
- Awarded: 7 October 1988
- Builder: Mc Dermott Shipyards, Morgan City, Louisiana
- Laid down: 15 February 1991
- Launched: 26 September 1991
- Acquired: 27 January 1993
- Identification: IMO number: 8923997; MMSI number: 367836000; Callsign: NCWL
- Honors and awards: National Defense Service Medal
- Status: in active service

General characteristics
- Type: Victorious-class ocean surveillance ship
- Tonnage: 3,100 tons
- Displacement: 3,384 tons
- Length: 235 ft (72 m)
- Beam: 94 ft (29 m)
- Draft: 24 ft (7.3 m) (max)
- Propulsion: diesel-electric, two shafts, 1,600hp
- Speed: 9.6 knots (17.8 km/h; 11.0 mph)
- Complement: 19 civilian mariners, 5 sponsors
- Sensors & processing systems: both passive and active low frequency sonar arrays

USNS Effective (T-AGOS-21) is a Victorious-class ocean surveillance ship acquired by the U.S. Navy in 1993 and assigned to the Navy's Special Mission Program.

== Built in Morgan City, Louisiana ==
Effective was built by Mc Dermott Shipyards, Morgan City, Louisiana. She was laid down on 15 February 1991 and launched 26 September 1991 and was delivered to the Navy on 27 January 1993 which assigned her to the Military Sealift Command (MSC) Special Missions Program.

== Mission ==
The mission of Effective is to directly support the Navy by using both passive and active low frequency sonar arrays to detect and track undersea threats.

== Operational history ==
There is no current operational history on Effective.

== Honors and awards ==
Effective personnel are qualified for the following medals:

- National Defense Service Medal

== Note ==
There is no journal entry on Effective at DANFS.
