= USNS Lawrence H. Gianella =

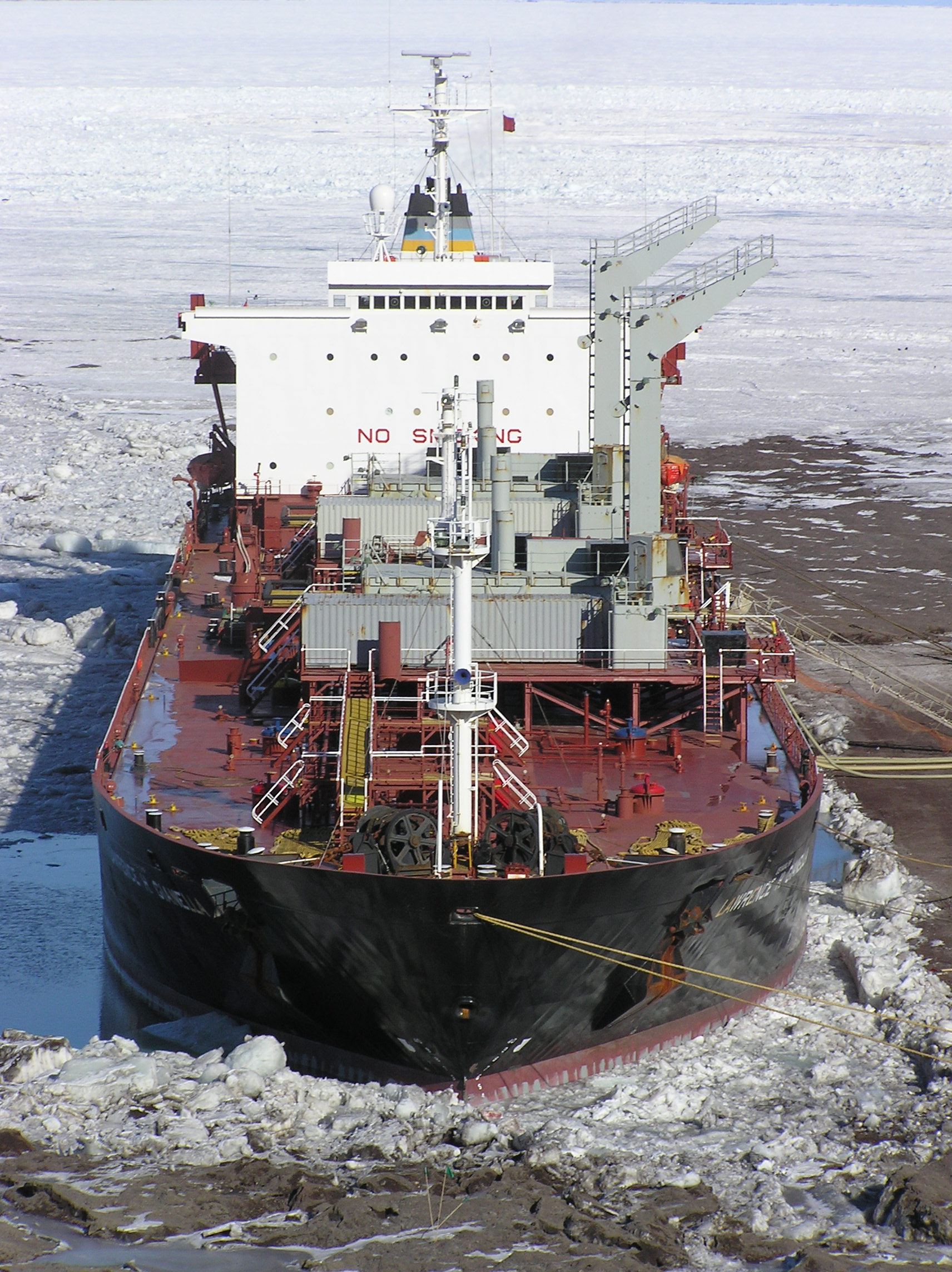
- USNS Lawrence Gianella

History

United States
- Name: USNS Lawrence H. Gianella
- Builder: American Ship Building Company, Tampa, Florida
- Launched: 1985
- In service: 22 April 1986
- Out of service: 23 May 2019
- Identification: IMO number: 8314158; MMSI number: 368769000; Callsign: NBBK
- Status: Arrived at Brownsville for scrapping 16 APR 2024

General characteristics
- Displacement: 39,624 long tons (40,260 t) full
- Length: 615 ft (187 m)
- Beam: 90 ft (27 m)
- Draft: 24 ft 8 in (7.52 m)
- Propulsion: 1 × 5-cylinder Sulzer 5RTA 76 diesel engine, 18,400 hp (13.7 MW), 1 shaft
- Speed: 16 knots (30 km/h; 18 mph)
- Capacity: 237,766 bbl (37,801.8 m^{3})
- Complement: 24 contract mariners
- Armament: None

USNS Lawrence H. Gianella (T-AOT-1125) was a United States Military Sealift Command product tanker which typically carries diesel, gasoline, and JP5 (jet fuel).

== Name origin ==
The vessel is named for Radio Operator Lawrence H. Gianella who was posthumously awarded the Merchant Marine Distinguished Service Medal in 1943 for the heroic action he undertook when his ship was torpedoed on 19 December 1941 in mid-Pacific. Orders had been given to abandon the rapidly sinking ship but Gianella - realizing that his shipmates chances of rescue were slim and dependent on him getting out an SOS message - stayed on board and rigged an emergency radio set, thus sacrificing himself for his shipmates.

== Service ==
Lawrence Gianella headed south towards McMurdo Station, Antarctica

Among Lawrence H. Gianella’s multiple tasks, her reinforced steel bow enables her to battle through pack ice in southern seas and deliver fuel to McMurdo Station, Antarctica. On 1 July 2009, she shifted from the MSC's Sealift Program and began serving the Command's Prepositioning Program. The ships assigned to the program preposition U.S. Marine Corps vehicles, equipment, and ammunition throughout the world. Lawrence H. Gianella served the program by delivering petroleum products to Department of Defense storage and distribution facilities worldwide.
