= MV C Champion =

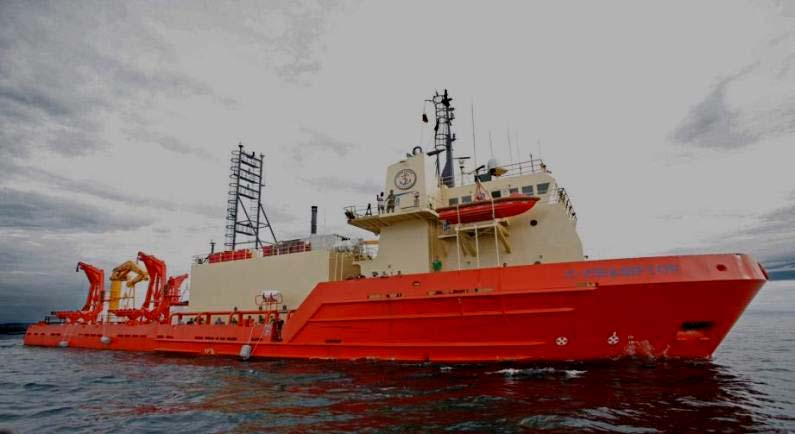
- The MV C Champion of the US Military Sealift Command.

History

United States
- Name: C Champion
- Owner: United States Military Sealift Command
- Launched: 1998
- Identification: IMO number: 9132284; MMSI number: 368227000; Callsign: WCX9392
- Status: in active service

General characteristics
- Class & type: Submarine and Special Warfare Support
- Tonnage: 2,106 GT
- Displacement: 1,934 tons
- Length: 67 m (219 ft 10 in)
- Beam: 17 m (55 ft 9 in)
- Draft: 5 m (16 ft 5 in)
- Speed: 10 kn (19 km/h; 12 mph)
- Complement: 12 civilian crew; 30 special forces
- Armament: 2 × 0.5 in (13 mm) machine guns

MV C Champion is a submarine and special warfare support vessel in the United States Military Sealift Command. The vessel has been proposed to serve as an anti-piracy escort, where it would be armed with two fifty-caliber machine guns, and four high-speed pursuit craft. Special forces carried by the vessel would use the high speed pursuit craft to intercept or chase pirates. In 2011, it rescued a family of five in the Philippine Sea.
