= MV C Commando =

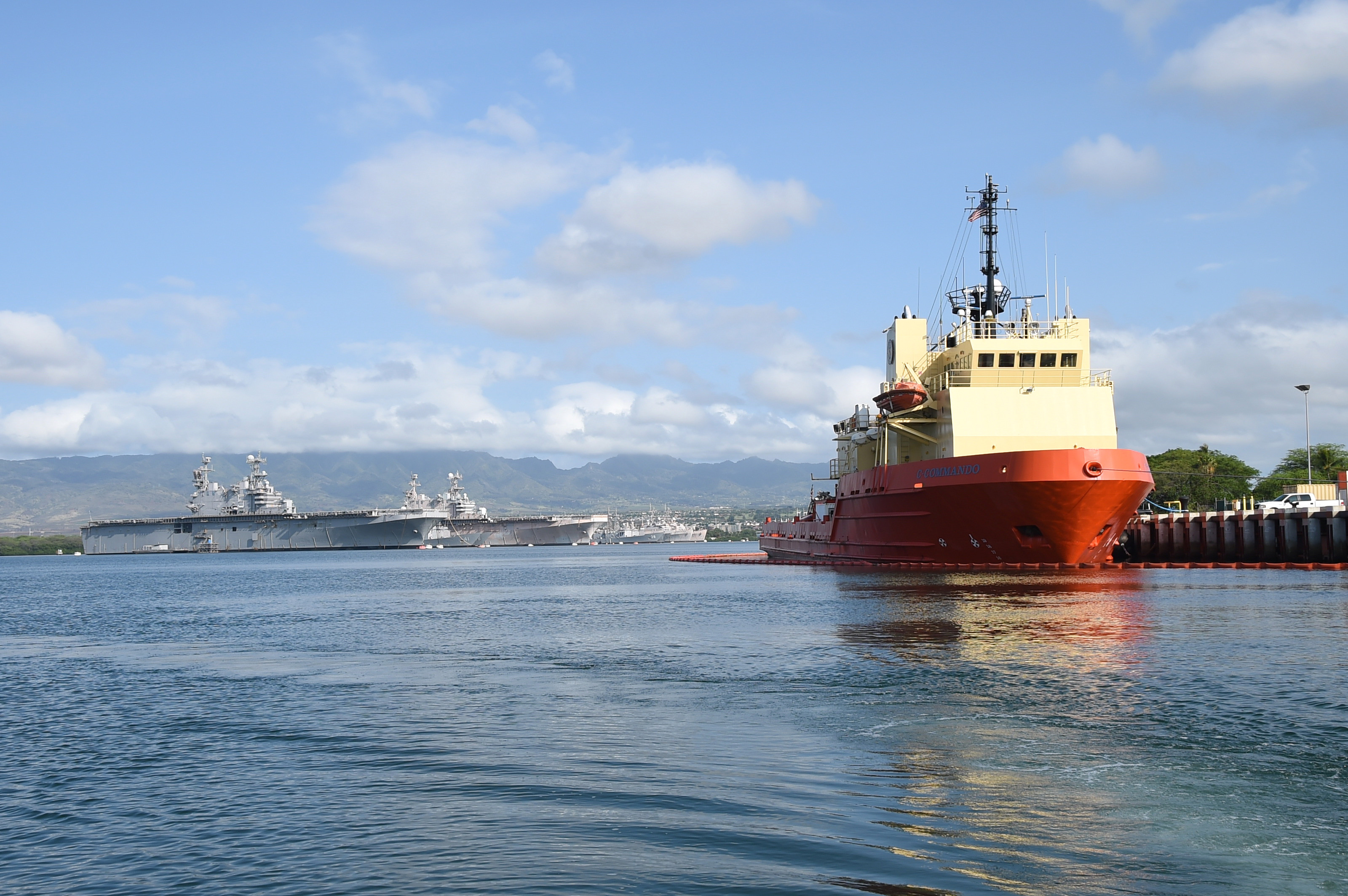
- C-Commando in Pearl Harbor with carriers in background, July 2016

History

United States
- Name: MV C-Commando (SSV)
- Owner: United States Military Sealift Command
- Builder: North American Shipbuilding, Larose, La.
- Launched: 1998
- Identification: IMO number: 9132210; MMSI number: 368501000; Callsign:
- Status: in active service
- Notes: Home port Galliano LA

General characteristics
- Class & type: Submarine and Special Warfare Support
- Tonnage: 1,903 GT
- Displacement: 2,206 tons
- Length: 67 m (219 ft 10 in)
- Beam: 17 m (55 ft 9 in)
- Draft: 5 m (16 ft 5 in)
- Speed: 12 kn (22 km/h; 14 mph)
- Complement: 14 crew + 30 sponsor/passengers

The MV C Commando is a ship used in support of special operations and submarines. It has cranes mounted to the side that make working with such teams easier, and it has a large enclosed area in the rear for working. Little is known about the ship beyond this.
