= USNS VADM K. R. Wheeler =

Offshore supply ship of the United States Navy

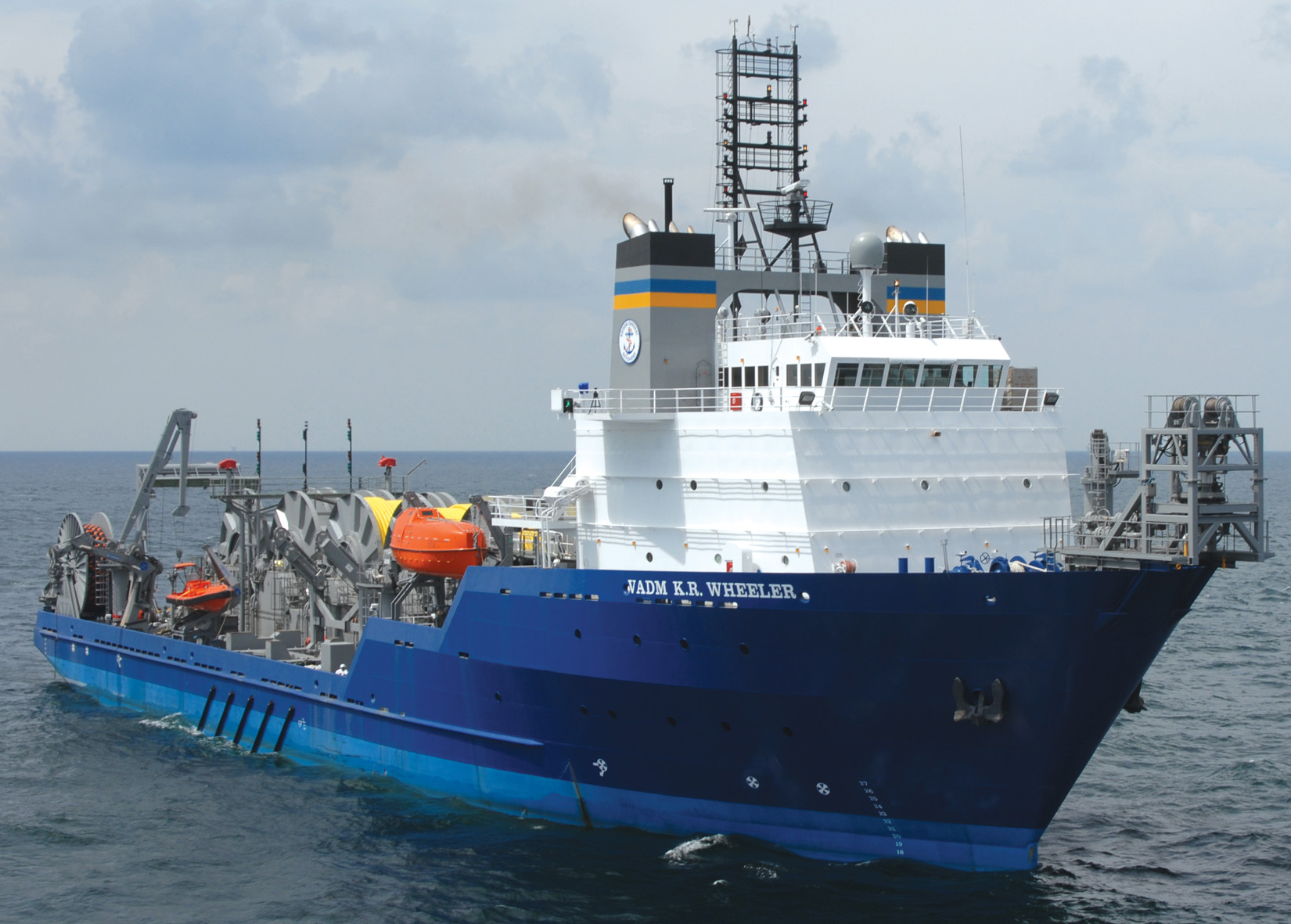
- USNS VADM K. R. Wheeler

History

United States
- Name: VADM K. R. Wheeler
- Namesake: Kenneth Ray Wheeler
- Owner: Military Sealift Command (2007–2012); United States Navy (2012–present)
- Builder: Edison Chouest Offshore
- Completed: 2007
- Acquired: 20 September 2007
- Home port: Galliano
- Identification: IMO number: 9354038; MMSI number: 369887000; Callsign: NWLE; Hull number: T-AG-5001
- Status: Active

General characteristics
- Type: Offshore Petroleum Distribution System
- Displacement: 6,491 t (6,388 long tons)
- Length: 349 ft 0 in (106.38 m)
- Beam: 70 ft 0 in (21.34 m)
- Draft: 26 ft 0 in (7.92 m)
- Propulsion: diesel engine
- Speed: 15 knots (28 km/h; 17 mph)
- Capacity: 500,000 barrels petroleum
- Complement: 26 mariners

USNS VADM K. R. Wheeler (T-AG-5001), (formerly (AG-5001)), is an Offshore Petroleum Distribution System (OPDS) ship built in 2007. The ship is named after Vice Admiral Kenneth Ray Wheeler, an American sailor who was a Legion of Merit recipient and Prisoner of War during World War II.

The Navy announced it would transfer the USNS VADM K.R. Wheeler on 1 July 2026 to the US Maritime Administration.

== Construction and commissioning ==
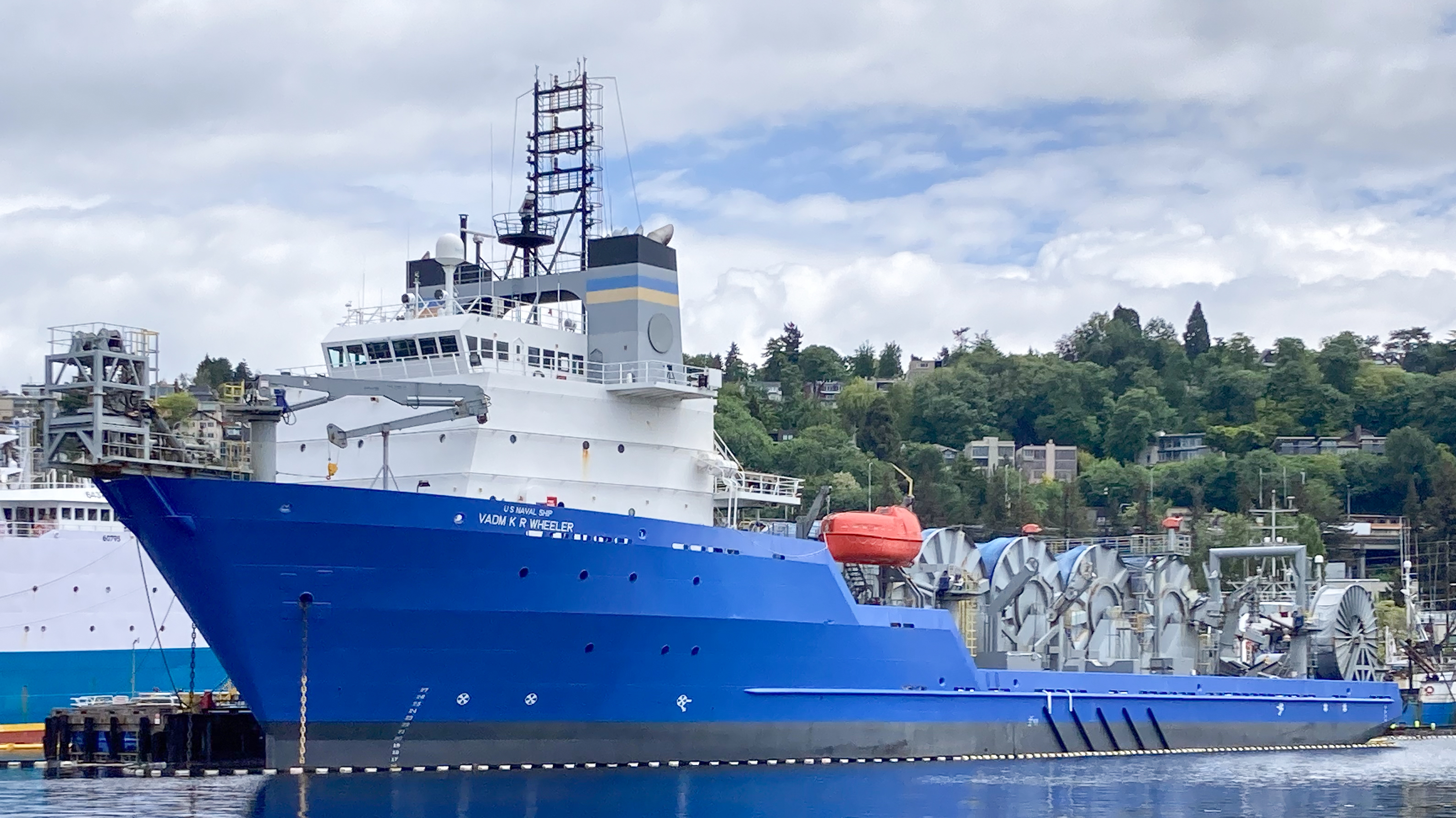
VADM K. R. Wheeler in 2024

The ship was built in 2007 by Edison Chouest Offshore, Louisiana. Later acquired and placed in service with the Military Sealift Command (MSC) on 20 September 2007, at Eglin Air Force Base, Florida under a 5 year contract. She was put into the Prepositioning Program and the Maritime Prepositioning Ship Squadron 3. The ship operates in the Pacific Ocean.

On 20 August 2012, she was then bought by United States Navy to be used as an OPDS, with the support of USNS Fast Tempo. She supported the Combined Joint Logistics Over-the-Shore (CJLOTS) 2015 exercise off South Korea on 3 July 2015. Military officials including Vice Adm. Joseph P. Aucoin, commander of U.S. 7th Fleet, attended a tour of the OPDS VADM K. R. Wheeler during Exercise Ssang Yong 16, off Pohang on 17 March 2016.

The ship together with Task Force-West assisted the islands of Tinian and Saipan after they were struck by Typhoon Yutu on 24 October 2018.
