= USNS Impeccable =

US naval surveillance vessel

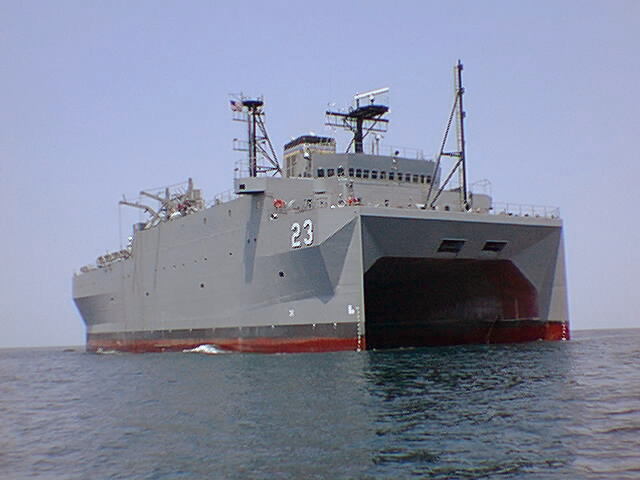
- USNS Impeccable

History

United States
- Name: Impeccable
- Owner: United States Navy
- Operator: Military Sealift Command
- Builder: American Shipbuilding, Tampa, Florida
- Laid down: 15 March 1992
- Completed: at Halter Marine Inc., Gulfport, Mississippi, in 1995
- Launched: 28 August 1998
- In service: 22 March 2001
- Identification: IMO number: 9249647; MMSI number: 338823000; Callsign: NINT
- Honors and awards: National Defense Service Medal
- Status: in active service

General characteristics
- Class & type: Impeccable-class ocean surveillance ship
- Displacement: 5,368 tons
- Length: 281 ft 5 in (85.78 m)
- Beam: 95 ft 8 in (29.16 m)
- Draft: 26 ft (7.9 m)
- Propulsion: diesel-electric, two shafts, 5,000shp
- Speed: 12 knots (22 km/h; 14 mph)
- Complement: 25 civilian mariners, 25 military
- Sensors & processing systems: SURTASS passive and active low frequency sonar arrays

USNS Impeccable (T-AGOS-23) is an Impeccable-class ocean surveillance ship acquired by the U.S. Navy in 2001 and assigned to Military Sealift Command's Special Missions Program.

== Construction ==
Impeccable was built by American Shipbuilding, Tampa, Florida. The contract was awarded on 28 March 1991. The ship's keel was laid down on 15 March 1992, but the Tampa shipyards went bankrupt by November 1993. On 3 December 1992, the General Accounting Office published a report that concluded that T-AGOS 24–27 should not be built. Shortly afterwards the government decided to discontinue this class of ships, but Impeccable was to be completed as the sole ship in her class. The hull was towed to Gulfport, Mississippi, in 1995 where she was finished by Halter Marine Inc. She was launched on 28 August 1998 and was delivered to the Navy on 22 March 2001 which assigned her to the Military Sealift Command (MSC) Special Missions Program.

== Design ==
The ship is a designated T-AGOS vessel built to tow a Surveillance Towed Array Sensor System. The ship's catamaran-type small waterplane area twin hull (SWATH) design prevents the vessel from rolling in heavy seas and gives additional deck space for storing the acoustic equipment.

== Mission ==
The mission of Impeccable is to directly support the Navy by using SURTASS passive and active low frequency sonar arrays to detect and track undersea threats.

== Operational history ==
=== Low Frequency Active Sonar ===
- The SURTASS Low Frequency Active Sonar system, onboard Impeccable, commenced sea trials in late February 2004. During the spring and summer of 2004, Impeccable conducted five training missions in the Philippine Sea and the northwest Pacific Ocean. All LFA sonar operations included the operation of the High Frequency / Marine Mammal Mitigation sonar and compliance with all mitigation requirements.
- Total operational days on board Impeccable using the LFA array:

(15 August 2003 to 15 August 2004) 26.2 days with 63.0 hours of transmissions
(15 August 2004 to 15 August 2005) 9.4 days with 22.7 hours of transmissions
(15 August 2005 to 15 August 2006) 22.5 days with 39.4 hours of transmissions.

- The ship had five years of active and passive operations in the Western Pacific before the incident in the South China Sea.

=== South China Sea incidents ===
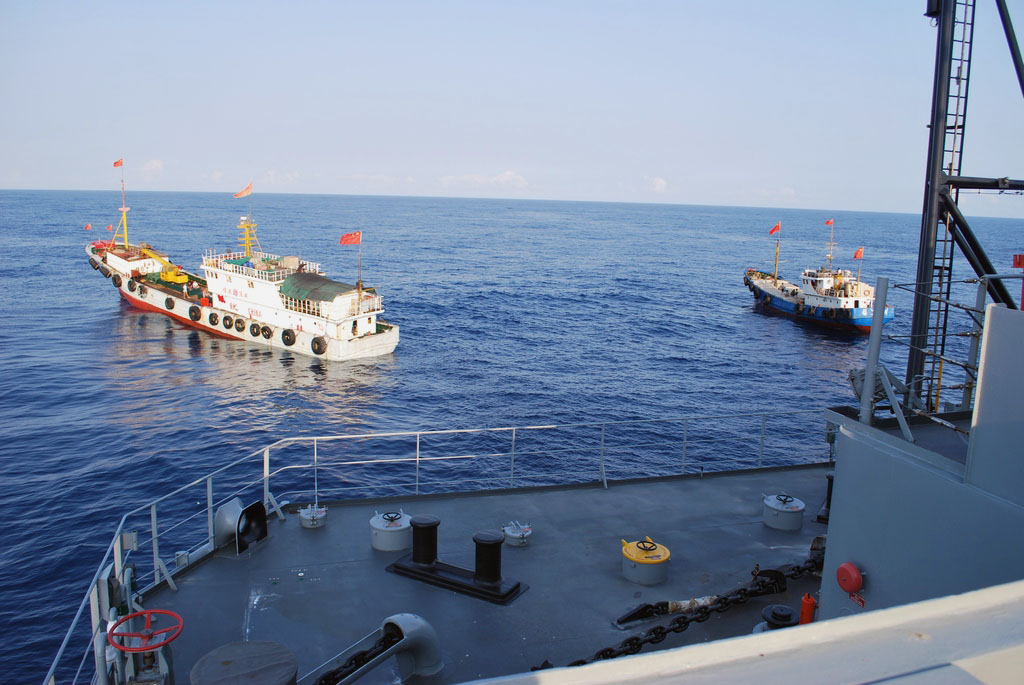
Two Chinese trawlers stop directly in front of Impeccable, forcing the ship to conduct an emergency "all stop" in order to avoid collision.

On 5 March 2009, Impeccable was in the South China Sea monitoring submarine activity when it was approached by a People's Liberation Army Navy (PLAN) frigate, which crossed her bow at a range of approximately 100 yards without first making contact. This was followed less than two hours later by a Chinese Y-12 aircraft, conducting 11 flyovers of Impeccable at an altitude of 600 feet (180 m) and a range from 100–300 feet (30–90 m). The frigate then crossed Impeccable's bow again, this time at a range of approximately 400–500 yards.

On 7 March, a Chinese intelligence ship contacted Impeccable over bridge-to-bridge radio, calling her operations illegal and directing Impeccable to leave the area or "suffer the consequences."

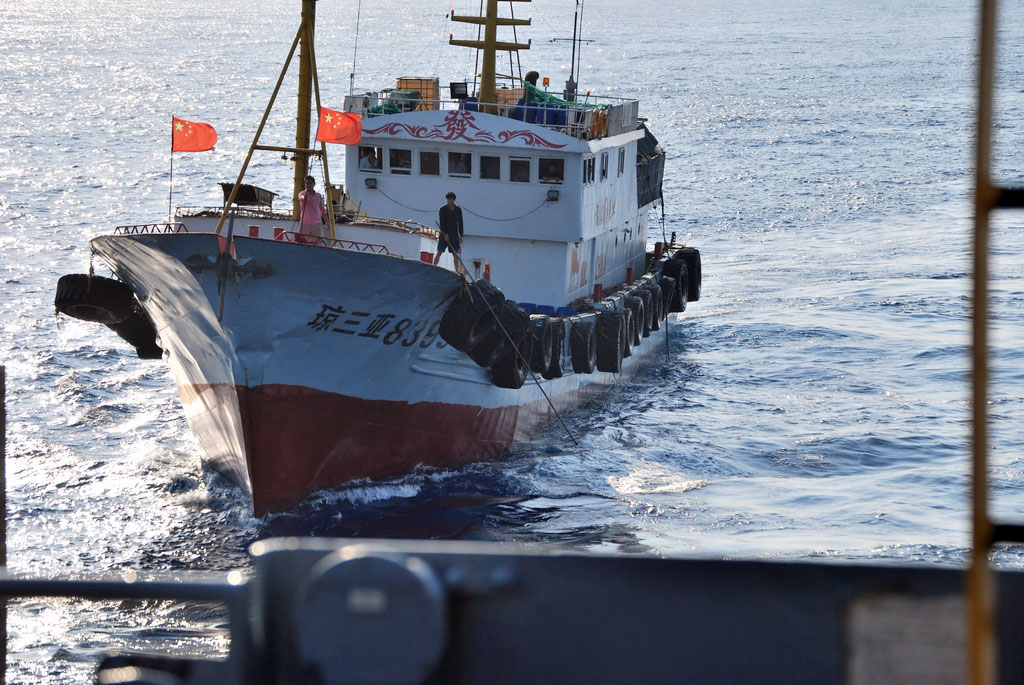
One Chinese crewmen waves a Chinese flag, while another uses a grappling hook to try to snag Impeccable's towed sonar array.

On 8 March 2009, Impeccable was 75 miles south of Hainan, China, when it was shadowed by five Chinese ships: a Bureau of Maritime Fisheries Patrol Vessel, a State Oceanic Administration patrol vessel, a PLA Navy ocean surveillance ship, and two Chinese-flagged naval trawlers, which maneuvered close to Impeccable, with two closing in to 50 feet (15 m), waving Chinese flags, and ordering Impeccable from the area. Impeccable sprayed water at one of the nearest Chinese ships; the Chinese sailors stripped down to their underwear and their vessel closed in to within 25 feet of the American ship. Shortly after the incident, Impeccable radioed the Chinese crews, informing them of her intentions to leave the area, and requesting a safe pass to travel. When she was trying to leave the area, the two Chinese trawlers dropped pieces of wood in Impeccable's path and stopped directly in front of her, forcing her to do an emergency stop to avoid a collision. Once Impeccable got under way, the crew aboard one of the trawlers used a grappling hook to try to snag Impeccable's towed sonar array.

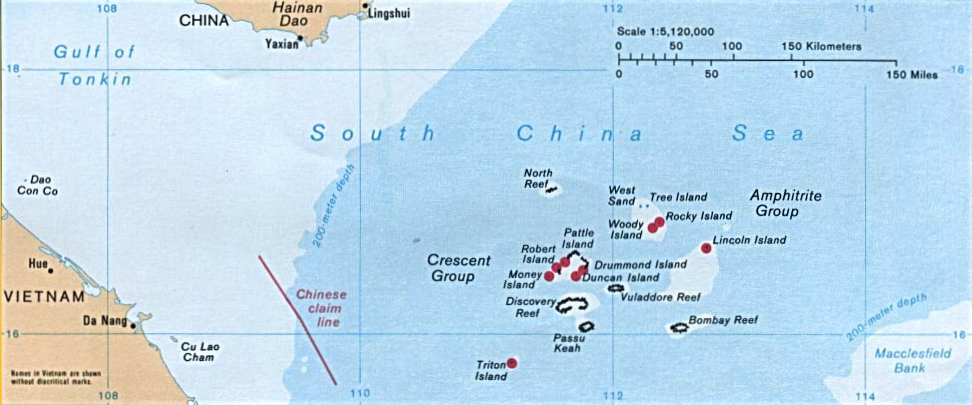
The Hainan Submarine Base is on the island of Hainan. The nearby Paracel Islands are administered by China, but claimed by both Vietnam and Taiwan

The United States lodged formal protests following the incident, stating that under international law, the U.S. military can conduct activities "in waters beyond the territorial sea of another state without prior notification or consent" including in an exclusive economic zone of another country. "The unprofessional maneuvers by Chinese vessels violated the requirement under international law to operate with due regard for the rights and safety of other lawful users of the ocean." China's Foreign Ministry responded that the Pentagon's complaints that five Chinese vessels had harassed Impeccable were "totally inaccurate", although this claim was disputed by several released reports, which all state that Impeccable was interfered with numerous times, both while operating in the area and when attempting to leave.

On 12 March 2009, U.S. President Barack Obama gave the go-ahead to send the guided missile destroyer USS Chung-Hoon to the South China Sea to protect Impeccable while operating in that area.

Hans M. Kristensen of the Federation of American Scientists has suggested that the incident may be related to the classified Type 093 submarine that the Chinese navy had recently deployed in the area.

==== Views on the legality of US and Chinese actions during these incidents ====
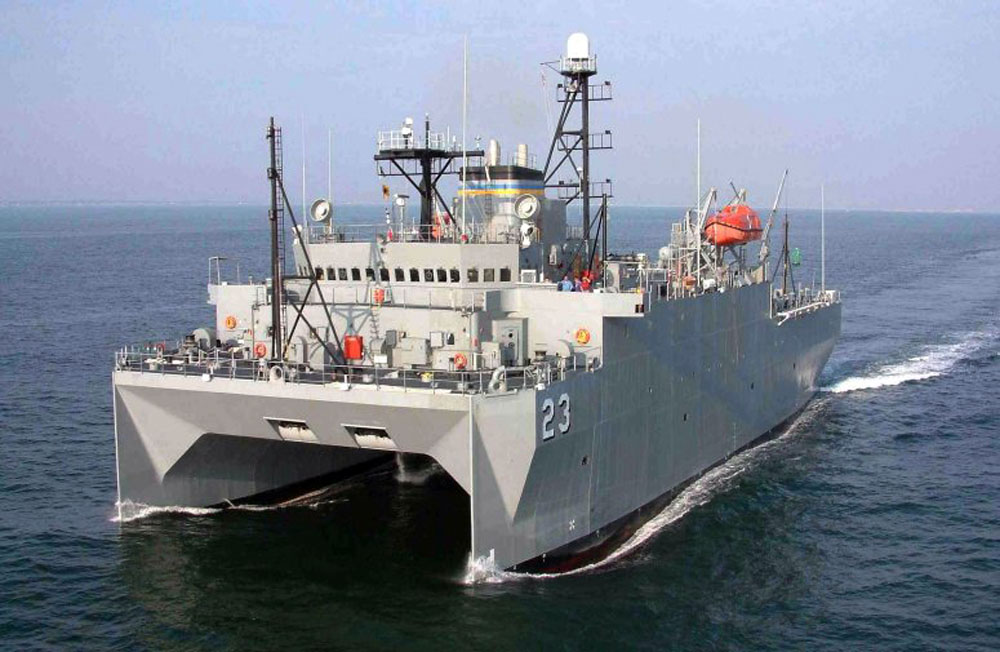
Impeccable in 2009

The United States maintains that the Convention, which it has signed, but not yet ratified, authorizes activities such as those undertaken by Impeccable. Several legal experts also state that there is no legal foundation for China's claim that it can prevent foreign naval vessels from operating within its Exclusive Economic Zone. For example, Raul Pedrozo, writing in the Chinese Journal of International Law, concludes that "all nations may legitimately engage in military activities in foreign exclusive economic zones, without prior notice to, or consent of, the coastal State concerned." On the contrary, Chinese officials assert that the operations are illegal. Rear Admiral Wang Dengping, political commissar of the Armament Department of the Chinese Navy, condemned Impeccable's activities, stating that "Innocent passage by naval vessels from other countries in the Territorial waters in the Special Economic Zone is acceptable, but not allowed otherwise" under the Convention. Chinese actions were further defended by Professor Ji Guoxing of Shanghai Jiao Tong University who, writing in China Security, maintained that under the Convention, navigation rights in coastal countries' exclusive economic zones are "subject to the resource-related and environment-related laws and regulations of the coastal state," and China could exclude Impeccable on this basis. Ji further asserted that the Convention's prohibition against gathering military intelligence in another country's territorial waters should be interpreted to also prohibit intelligence gathering in coastal countries' exclusive economic zones.

== 2015 rescue at sea ==
On July 19, 2015 while en route for a scheduled port visit to Subic Bay, USNS Impeccable (T-AGOS 23) rescued 11 fishermen. Impeccable sailors spotted personnel on a partially submerged ship and noted debris in the water. "They [Impeccable crew] initially spotted only eight people on the partially submerged vessel," said Lt. Cory Hilgart, the theater anti-submarine watch officer at Commander, Task Force 74. "They then realized that it was actually 11 and made the call to commence the rescue effort." Impeccable's master immediately deemed assistance was required and began preparations to deploy their rigid hull inflatable boat (RHIB) to rescue the personnel. "This was a team effort with civilian mariners, SECDET [security detachment], MILDET [military detachment] and Lockheed Martin working together to achieve an efficient rescue of all 11 fishermen," said Robert Wiechert, Master of Impeccable. The RHIB made three trips to the distressed vessel and recovered all eleven individuals. "One of the crew members spoke English," said Hilgart. "He told the Impeccable crew that they were fishermen from the Subic Bay region. He confirmed that there were only 11 on board." Once the mariners were brought aboard Impeccable, they were examined by medical personnel and given food and water. No serious injuries or illnesses were reported. Shortly after Impeccable arrived in port in Subic Bay, July 20, the mariners were turned over to the Philippine Coast Guard.

== See also ==
- Code for Unplanned Encounters at Sea
- Hainan Island incident
- New Star ship incident
- Territorial waters
- United Nations Convention on the Law of the Sea
- USNS Victorious (T-AGOS-19)
- USNS Stalwart (T-AGOS-1)
