= MT SLNC Pax =

History

United States
- Name: SLNC Pax
- Owner: Schuyler Line Navigation Company
- Launched: 2008
- Identification: Hull number: T-AOT 5356; IMO number: 9383663; MMSI number: 338164000; Callsign: WDH3033
- Status: in active service

General characteristics
- Type: Tanker
- Tonnage: 8,025 DWT
- Displacement: 10,149 t (9,989 long tons)
- Length: 101 m (331 ft 4 in) oa
- Beam: 19.4 m (63 ft 9 in)
- Draft: Summer draft 7.6 m (24 ft 11 in)
- Speed: 12 knots (22 km/h; 14 mph)
- Crew: 16

MT SLNC Pax is a tanker which is used in support of United States Department of Defense facilities around the world. It is able to replenish bases' long term oil stores at those facilities allowing for quick turn around and serviceability. The vessel is chartered from Schuyler Line by the U.S. Military Sealift Command.

== Description ==
SLNC Pax is measured at 8,025 tons deadweight (DWT), with a displacement of 10,149 metric tons (9,989 long tons). The vessel is 101-meter (331 ft 4 in) long overall, with a beam of 19.4 m (63 ft 9 in) and a summer draft of 7.6 m (24 ft 11 in). (Note: The Military Sealift Command's page has the vessel's length at 101.3 m (332 ft 6 in).) The ship has a maximum speed of 12 knots (22 km/h; 14 mph) and a crew of 16 civilian mariners.

== Service history ==
SLNC Pax was constructed in 2008 and operated by Schuyler Line Navigation Company. The shallow-draft oil tanker was chartered by the United States' Military Sealift Command to support the transport of cargo to United States Department of Defense (DoD) facilities. In 2025, the US DoD agreed to extend the contract for 51 million if all options are exercised.
