= Impeccable-class surveillance ship =

US military vessel

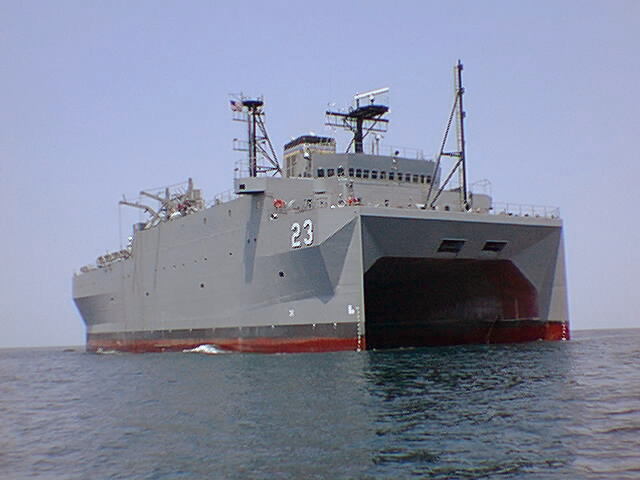
- USNS Impeccable, the only ship of the class.

Class overview
- Name: Impeccable class
- Builders: Tampa Shipyards, Tampa, Florida; (13-18) Halter Marine, Inc., Moss Point, Mississippi
- Operators: United States Navy
- Preceded by: Victorious class
- In service: 2000–present
- Planned: 6
- Completed: 1
- Canceled: 5
- Active: 1

General characteristics
- Type: Ocean surveillance ship
- Displacement: 5,368 tons
- Length: 281 ft 5 in (85.78 m)
- Beam: 95 ft 8 in (29.16 m)
- Draft: 26 ft (7.9 m)
- Propulsion: diesel-electric, two shafts, 5,000 shp (3,700 kW)
- Speed: 12 knots (22 km/h; 14 mph)
- Complement: 25 civilian mariners, 25 military
- Sensors & processing systems: SURTASS passive and active low frequency sonar arrays

The Impeccable-class ocean surveillance ship is a single-ship class of United States Navy special mission-support ship. The original intention was to build six undersea ocean-surveillance ships carrying a SURTASS passive towed array and a Low Frequency Active transducer array. Only the lead ship, USNS Impeccable (T-AGOS-23), was built.

== History ==
On March 28, 1991, Tampa Shipyards was awarded the contract to build the first ship of the class, the USNS Impeccable (T-AGOS-23). The keel was laid on March 15, 1992. However, before the ship was completed, Tampa Shipyards went bankrupt, and construction of the rest of the ship class was cancelled. The Chief of Naval Operations for the United States Navy asserted the requirement to finish the initial ship. The incomplete hull was towed to Gulfport, Mississippi in 1995, where it was completed by Halter Marine Inc. Impeccable was officially launched on November 1, 2000.

A second ship, the USNS Integrity (T-AGOS-24), was planned. However, the contract was never awarded. and the other four ships were never named.

== Similar ship classes ==
The Impeccable class is similar in appearance to the much smaller four ship Victorious class, led by the USNS Victorious (T-AGOS-19). Both classes are SWATH type ships. The ships perform a similar surveillance function to the older 18-ship Stalwart class, whose lead ship is the USNS Stalwart (T-AGOS-1). The Stalwart class is not a SWATH hull, but a modified oceangoing tug.
