= USNS Samuel L. Cobb =

Military transport ship

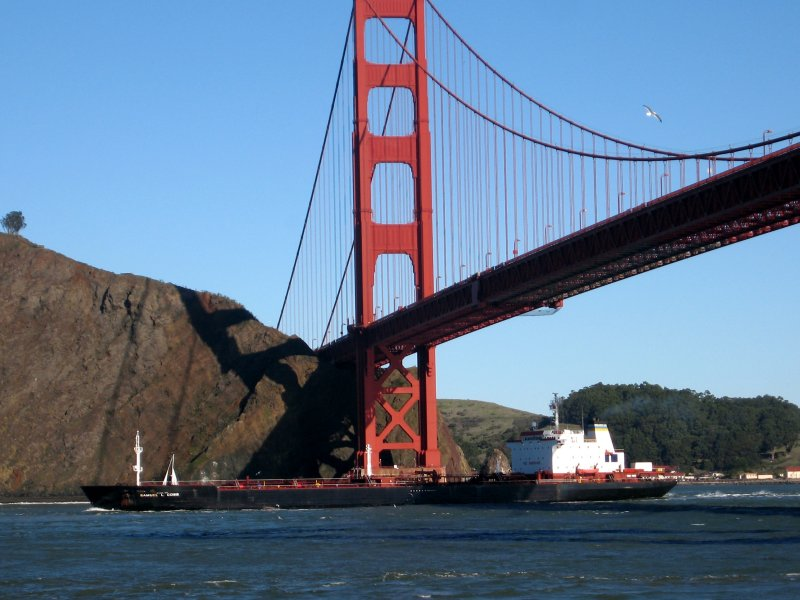
- USNS Samuel L. Cobb, beneath the Golden Gate Bridge, San Francisco Bay

History

United States
- Name: USNS Samuel L. Cobb
- Namesake: Samuel L. Cobb
- Operator: Military Sealift Command
- Builder: American Ship Building Company, Tampa, Florida
- Christened: 11/15/1985
- Acquired: 2003 by USN, redesignated USNS Samuel L. Cobb
- Out of service: October 30, 2010
- Renamed: 2003
- Stricken: October 30, 2010
- Identification: IMO number: 8310097; MMSI number: 338974000; Callsign: NBBQ
- Status: Laid up in the National Defense Reserve Fleet

General characteristics
- Class & type: T – 5 oil tanker
- Displacement: 32,572 t.(lt) 65,000 t.(fl)
- Length: 615 ft (187 m)
- Beam: 90 ft 0 in (27.43 m)
- Draft: 36 ft (11 m)
- Propulsion: 1 Sulzer 5RTA 76 diesel; 18,400 hp sustained; 1 shaft
- Speed: 16 knots (30 km/h)
- Capacity: 237,766 bbls
- Crew: 24 civilians

USNS Samuel L. Cobb (T-AOT-1123) was originally named the MV Samuel L. Cobb and used for transport of military assets in various theaters. It was not until the outbreak of the Iraq war in 2003 when the ship was purchased by the United States Navy that it was fully put under the operation of Military Sealift Command. This ship also had a refit to expand its abilities to do underway replenishment of multiple ships.

The ship was named after Samuel L. Cobb, the Master of the SS Alcoa Guide during World War II. Cobb was awarded the Merchant Marine Distinguished Service Medal for heroism and meritorious service under unusual hazards.

On the morning of February 9, 2024, the ship was observed being towed through the Brazos Santiago Pass at South Padre Island, presumably for recycling at the Brownsville shipyards.
