= MV Megan Beyel =

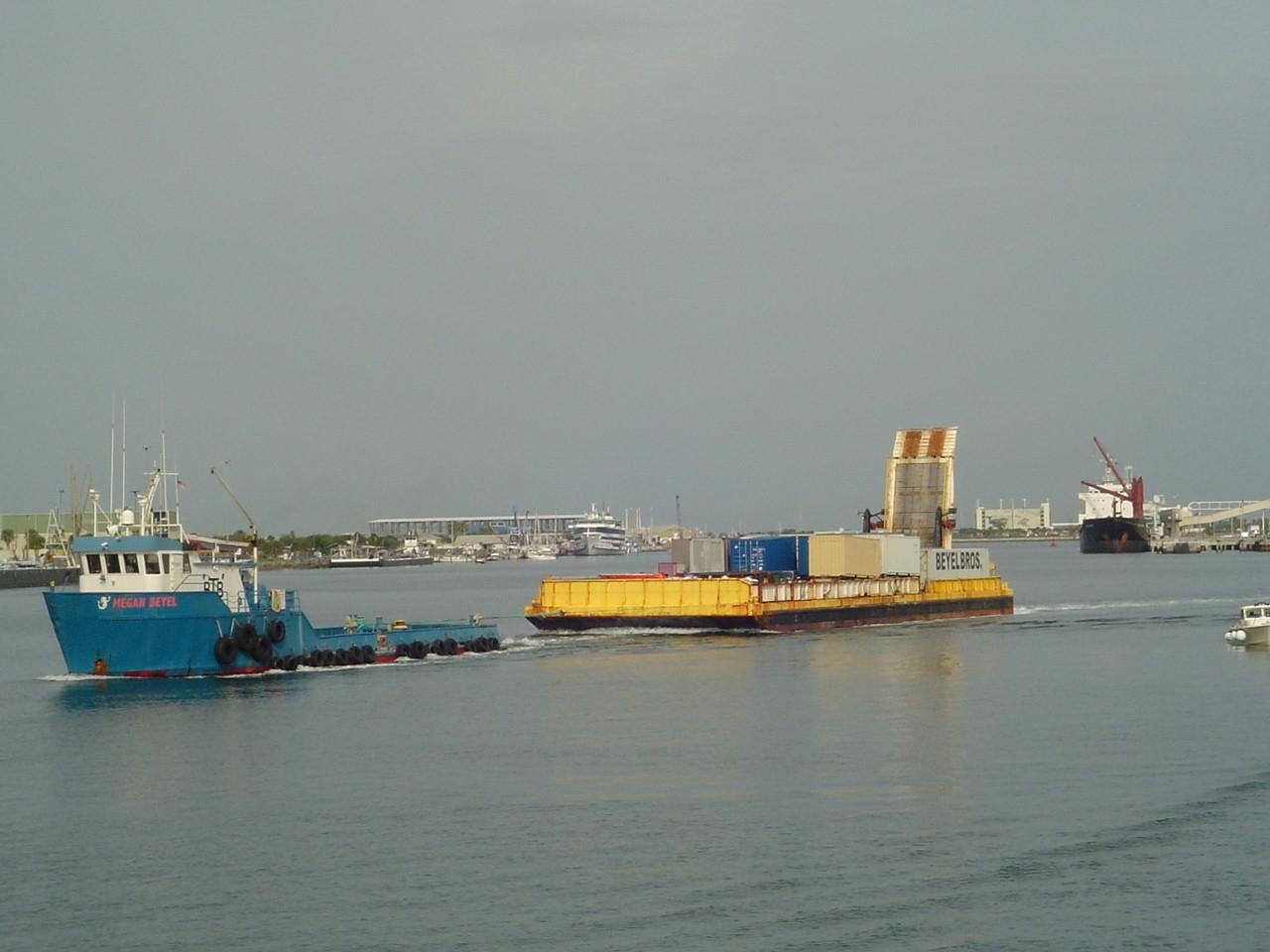
- MV Megan Beyel pulling a barge in port

History

United States
- Name: Mobro 1210
- Namesake: Megan Beyel (owner's daughter)
- Owner: Beyel Brothers Inc
- Operator: Military Sealift Command
- Builder: Corn Island Shipyard, Lamar, Indiana
- Launched: 1994
- Renamed: MV Megan Beyel
- Identification: MMSI number: 367148470; Callsign: WCZ2412
- Status: in active service

General characteristics
- Type: Tugboat
- Displacement: 237 tons
- Length: 160 ft (49 m)
- Beam: 50 ft (15 m)
- Draft: 8 ft (2.4 m)
- Speed: 6 knots (11 km/h)
- Crew: 4 civilian crew

MV Megan Beyel is a down range support ship, mainly used as a transport vehicle to support other ships offloading cargo during operations. It is run entirely by a civilian crew that is contracted to aide the military vessels where needed. Its small size allows it to operate in conditions and ports that other vessels would not be able to operate in. It is also powerful enough to aid the military tankers including T-5 classes into harbor so that the local tugs need not be relied upon.

The ship was named after the daughter of the ship's owner.

Megan Beyel has been used for various roles in the military but mostly operates in friendly ports in the aiding of offloading cargo. The ship was also being used in ports in Iraq and rarely used to bring some supplies up river.
