= MV HOS Dominator =

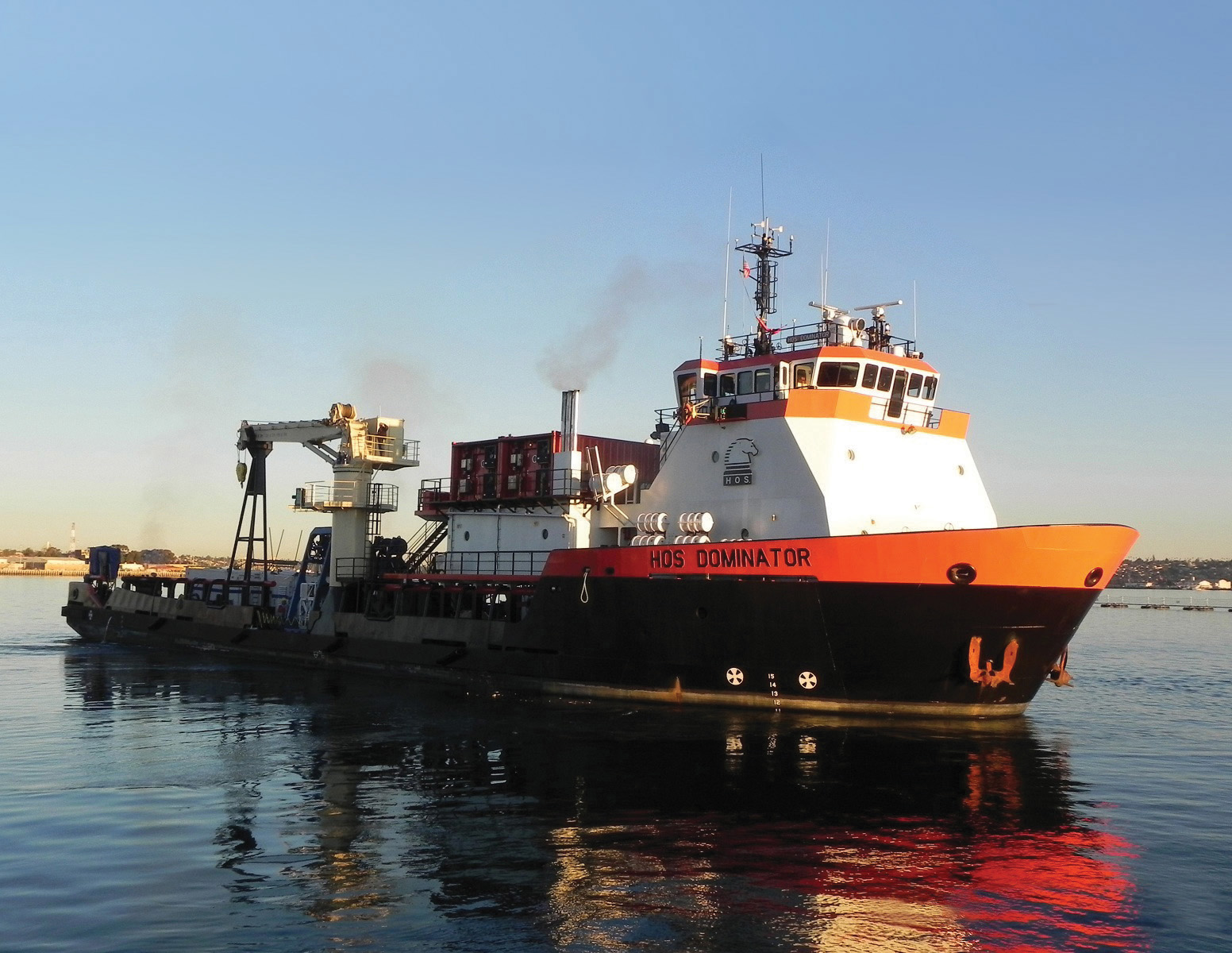
- MV HOS Dominator of the United States Military Sealift Command.

History

United States
- Name: HOS Dominator
- Owner: United States Military Sealift Command
- Builder: North American Shipbuilding, Larose, Louisiana
- Launched: 1998
- Identification: IMO number: 9265811; MMSI number: 369077000; Callsign:WDA6788
- Status: in active service

General characteristics
- Class & type: Submarine/Salvage/Rescue operations
- Tonnage: 2,026 GT
- Length: 240 feet
- Beam: 54 feet
- Draft: 8 feet min, 13 feet max
- Propulsion: 2 x Caterpillar 3516B 4,000 hp
- Speed: Cruise Speed: 10.0 kts @164 gal/hr (621 l/hr) Max Speed: 12.0 kts @205 gal/hr (776 l/hr)
- Sensors & processing systems: Beier IVCS 2000, C-Nav, CCTV Cameras, Depth Sounder, DGPS w/ AIS, EPIRB, Fanbeam, GMDSS "A3", Gyro Compass, Mag Compass, MAMS/VMS, Navtex, Radar (S-band), SARTs, Techsol, VHF Radio, Windbird, X-band Radar
- Notes: Dynamic Positioning Capability Class 2, Huisman SMST Telescoping crane. with 855 cubic feet of freezer/refrigerator space

The MV HOS Dominator is a ship of the United States Military Sealift Command used in support of special operations groups. Its large crane allows it to support salvage operations and has the ability to sleep many support staff if needed for an operation. It is used in rescue operation training.
