= USNS Fast Tempo =

Offshore supply ship of the United States Navy

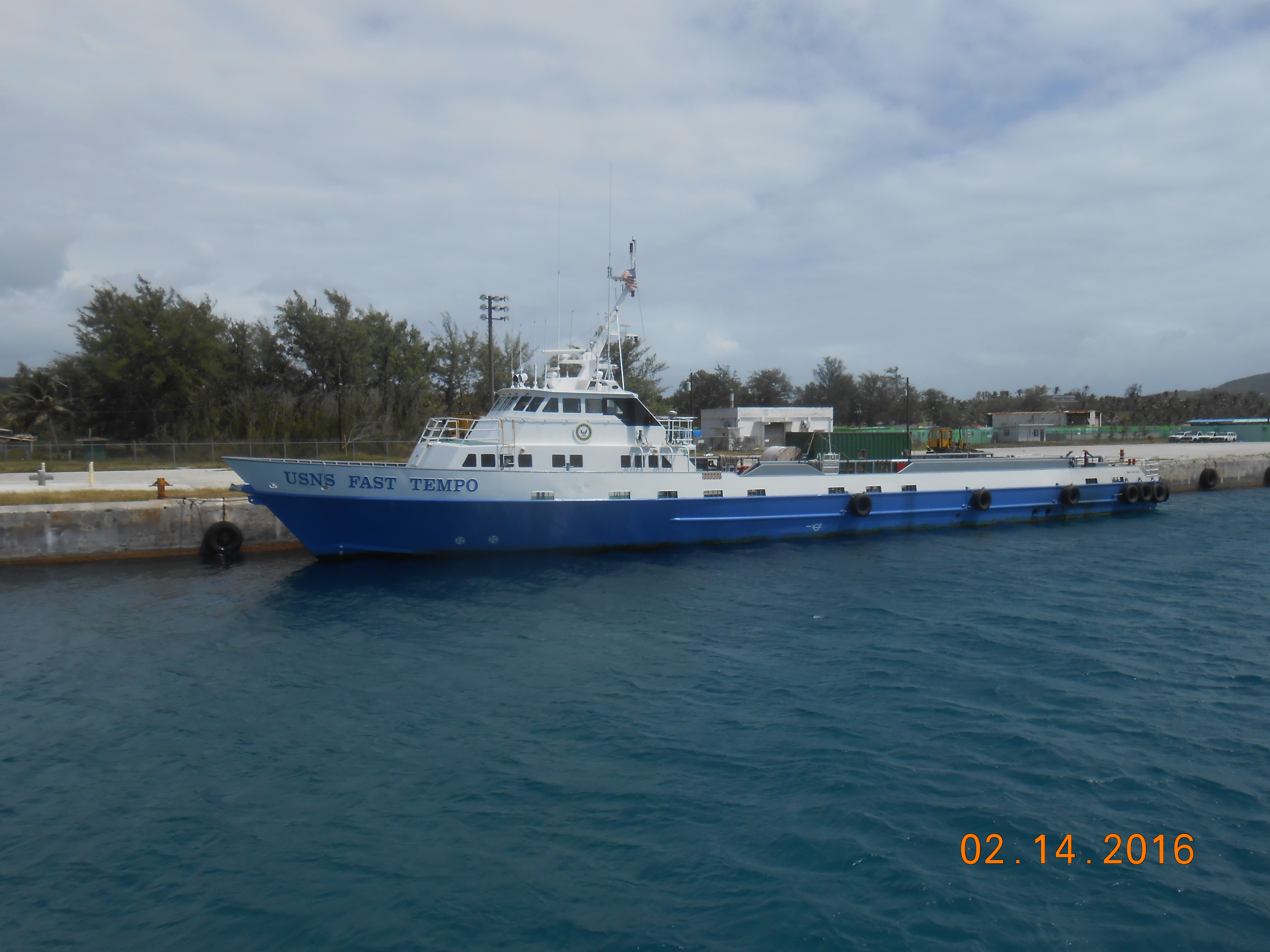
- USNS Fast Tempo in Tinian on 14 February 2016

History

United States
- Name: Fast Tempo
- Namesake: Fast Tempo
- Owner: United Marine Holdings (2006–2012); United States Navy (2012–present)
- Builder: Breaux Brothers, California
- Completed: 2006
- Identification: IMO number: 9347401; MMSI number: 369465000; Callsign: NAJK
- Status: Active

General characteristics
- Type: Tugboat; Supply ship
- Tonnage: 336 GT
- Displacement: 367 tonnes
- Length: 47.26 m (155 ft 1 in)
- Beam: 9.14 m (30 ft 0 in)
- Propulsion: diesel engine
- Speed: 15 knots (28 km/h; 17 mph)

USNS Fast Tempo is an ocean tug and supply ship for the United States Sealift Command. She was originally named MV Fast Tempo before being acquired by the United States Navy.

== Construction and commissioning ==
She was completed by Breaux Brothers Enterprises, Los Angeles in 2006. She was under the ownership of United Marine Holdings.

In 2012, she was then bought by U.S. Navy to be used in support of the USNS VADM K. R. Wheeler Offshore Petroleum Distribution System (OPDS).
