= Feeder ship =

Medium-size freight ship

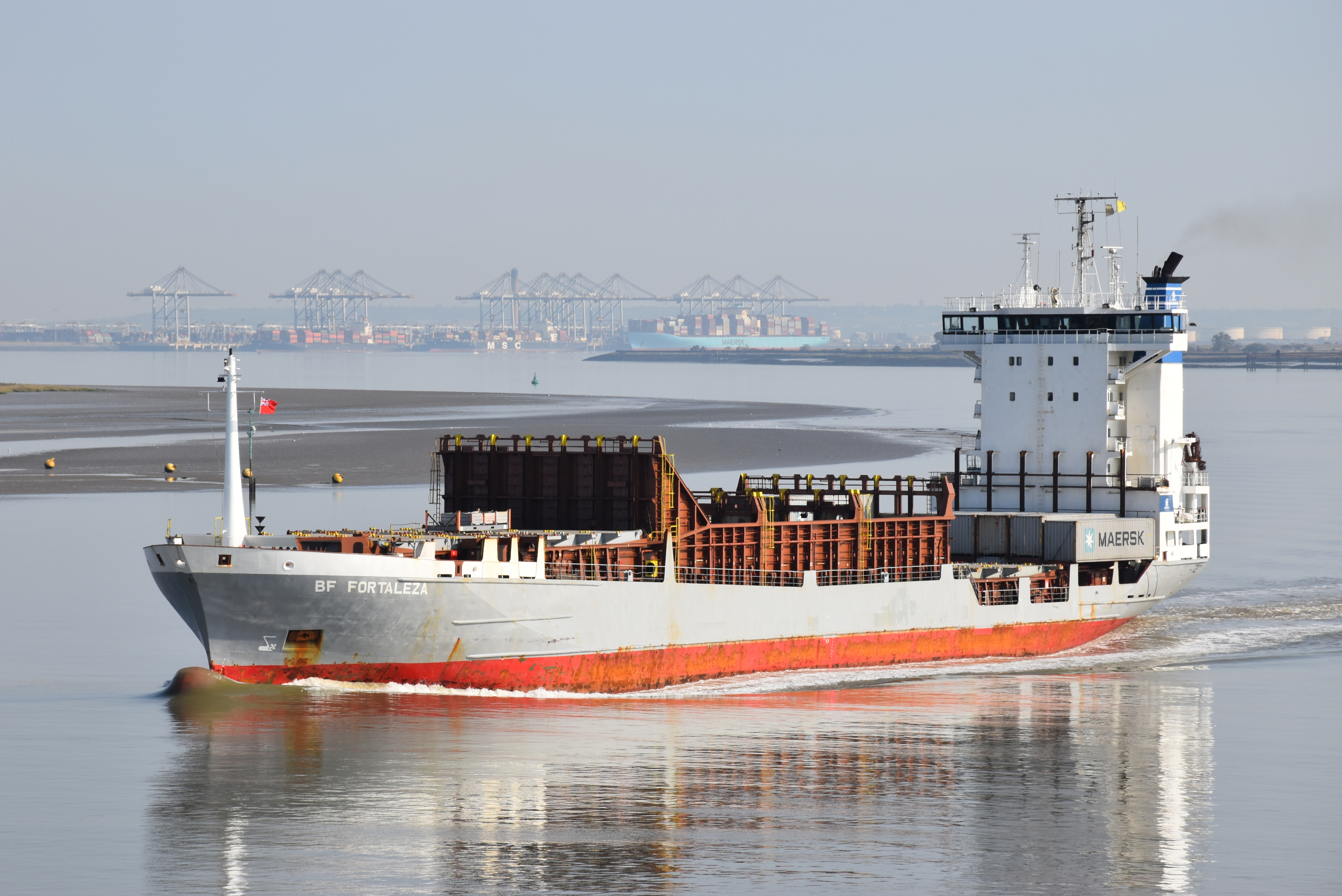
Container feeder ship, BF Fortaleza (700 TEU), with the London Gateway container terminal in the background

Feeder vessels or feeder ships are medium-size freight ships. In general, a feeder means a seagoing vessel with an average capacity of 300 to 1000 twenty-foot equivalent units (TEU). Feeders collect shipping containers from different ports and transport them to central container terminals where they are loaded to bigger vessels, or for further transport into the hub port's hinterland. In that way the smaller vessels feed the larger liners, which carry thousands of containers.

Over the years, feeder lines have been established by organizations transporting containers over a predefined route on a regular basis. Feeder ships are often run by companies that also specialize in short sea shipping. These companies not only ship freight to and from major ports like Rotterdam for further shipment, but also carry containers between smaller ports, for example, between terminals located on the north-west European seaboard and ports situated in the Baltic sea.

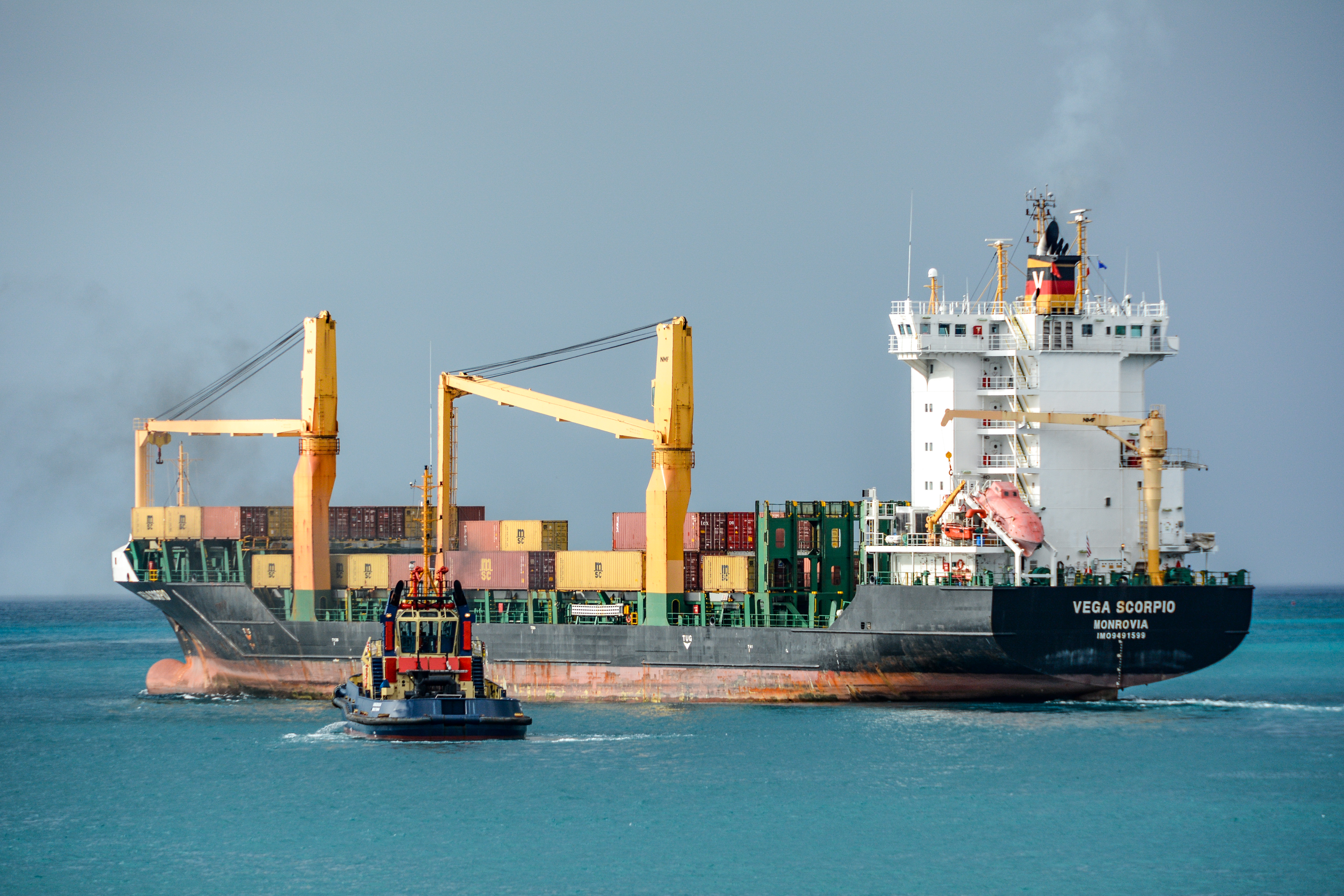
Container feeder ship, Vega Scorpio (957 TEU), with tugboat, Barbados II attending, leaving Port of Bridgetown, Barbados.

== Feeder classification ==
Container ships are distinguished into seven major size categories: small feeder, feeder, feedermax, panamax, post-Panamax, new Panamax and ultra-large (ULCV). Container ships under 3,000 TEU are generally called feeders.
