= USNS Victorious =

Ocean surveillance ship

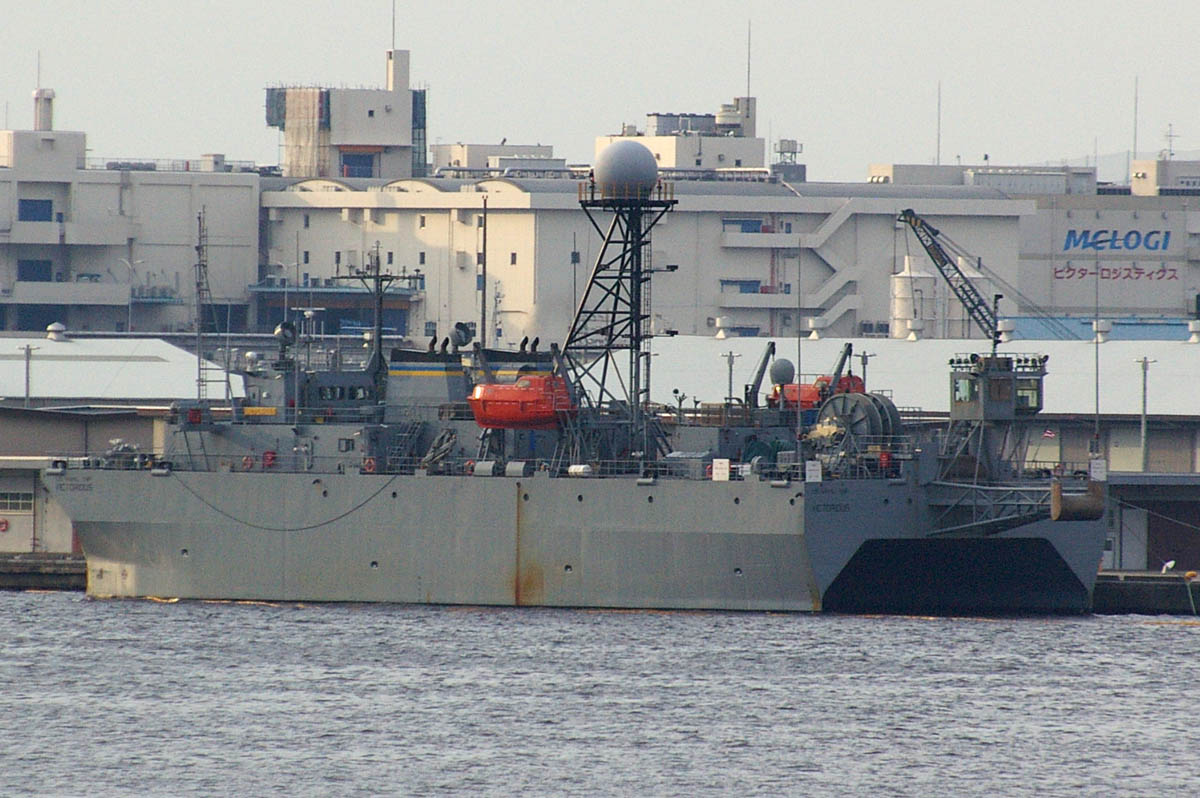
- USNS Victorious in Yokohama, Japan

History
- Awarded: 31 October 1986
- Builder: McDermott Shipyards, Morgan City, Louisiana
- Laid down: 12 April 1988
- Launched: 3 May 1990
- Acquired: 13 August 1991
- Identification: IMO number: 8923131; MMSI number: 367838000; Callsign: NVIC
- Status: in active service
- Notes: assigned by the U.S. Navy to the Special Missions Program

General characteristics
- Type: Victorious-class ocean surveillance ship
- Displacement: 3,100 tons (light); 3,384 tons (full)
- Length: 235 ft (72 m) (overall)
- Beam: 94 ft (29 m)
- Draft: 25 ft (7.6 m) (max)
- Propulsion: diesel-electric, two shafts, 1,600hp
- Speed: 9.6 knots (17.8 km/h; 11.0 mph)
- Complement: 19 civilian mariners, 5 sponsors

USNS Victorious (T-AGOS-19) is a Victorious-class ocean surveillance ship which was acquired by the U.S. Navy in 1991 and assigned to the Military Sealift Command (MSC) Special Missions Program.

== Built in Morgan City, Louisiana ==
Victorious was built by McDermott Shipyards, Morgan City, Louisiana. She was laid down on 12 April 1988 and launched on 3 May 1990 and was delivered to the U.S. Navy on 13 August 1991.

== Special program ==
Victorious was crewed by 19 civilian mariners under the control of the Military Sealift Command (MSC) and staffed with five sponsors.

She is of a small waterplane area twin hull (SWATH) design, similar to a catamaran, which provides a stable platform for towing the ship's SURTASS sonar arrays.

== Incidents with China ==
On March 4, 2009, Victorious was involved in one of a string of incidents between US research ships and Chinese ships. While operating in international waters, roughly 120 miles off the coast of mainland China in the Yellow Sea, a Chinese Bureau of Fisheries Patrol vessel used a high-intensity spotlight to illuminate the entire length of Victorious several times. The following day, a Chinese Y-12 maritime surveillance aircraft conducted 12 fly-bys of Victorious at an altitude of about 400 feet (120 m) and a range of 500 yards.

In May 2009, Victorious was again harassed by Chinese ships, this time while operating in the Yellow Sea. The Chinese vessels repeatedly approached Victorious at as close as 30 yards in heavy fog, at one point stopping in its path, forcing Victorious to stop to avoid a collision.

== See also ==
- United States Navy
- USNS Impeccable (T-AGOS-23)
