= USNS Lewis and Clark =

Cargo ship of the United States Navy

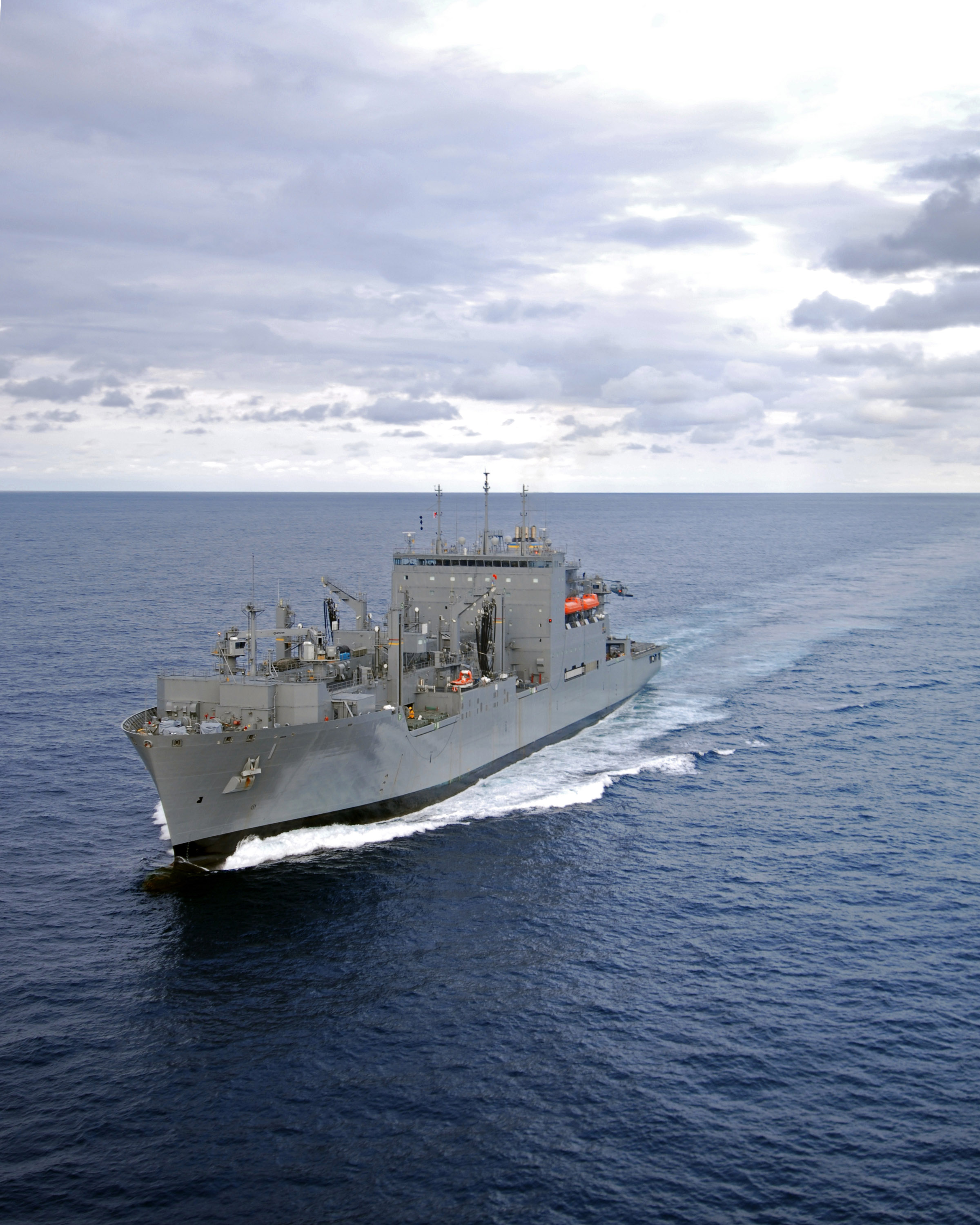
- USNS Lewis and Clark in the Atlantic Ocean, December 2006

History

United States
- Name: USNS Lewis and Clark
- Namesake: Meriwether Lewis and William Clark
- Ordered: 18 October 2001
- Builder: National Steel and Shipbuilding
- Laid down: 23 March 2004
- Launched: 21 May 2005
- In service: 20 June 2006
- Identification: IMO number: 9271418; MMSI number: 369854000; Callsign: NLNC
- Status: in active service

General characteristics
- Class & type: Lewis and Clark-class cargo ship
- Displacement: 41,000 long tons (42,000 t)
- Length: 689 ft (210 m)
- Beam: 105.6 ft (32.2 m)
- Draft: 29.9 ft (9.1 m)
- Propulsion: Integrated propulsion and ship service electrical system, with generation at 6.6 kV by FM/MAN B&W diesel generators; one fixed pitch propeller; bow thruster
- Speed: 20 knots (37 km/h)
- Range: 14,000 nautical miles at 20 knots; (26,000 km at 37 km/h)
- Capacity: Max dry cargo weight: 5,910 long tons (6,000 t); Max dry cargo volume: 783,000 cubic feet (22,200 m^{3}); Max cargo fuel weight: 2,350 long tons (2,390 t); Cargo fuel volume: 18,000 barrels (2,900 m^{3}); (DFM: 10,500) (JP5:7,500)
- Complement: 13 military, 123 civilian
- Aircraft carried: two helicopters

USNS Lewis and Clark (T-AKE-1) is an American dry cargo ship, the lead ship of her namesake class. It was the second ship of the United States Navy to be named for the explorers Meriwether Lewis and William Clark. The contract to build her was awarded to National Steel and Shipbuilding Company (NASSCO) of San Diego, California, on 18 October 2001 and her keel was laid down on 22 April 2004. She was launched on 21 May 2005, co-sponsored by Jane Lewis Sale Henley and Lisa Clark, descendants of the ship's namesakes. She was delivered to the Navy on 20 June 2006.

== Description ==
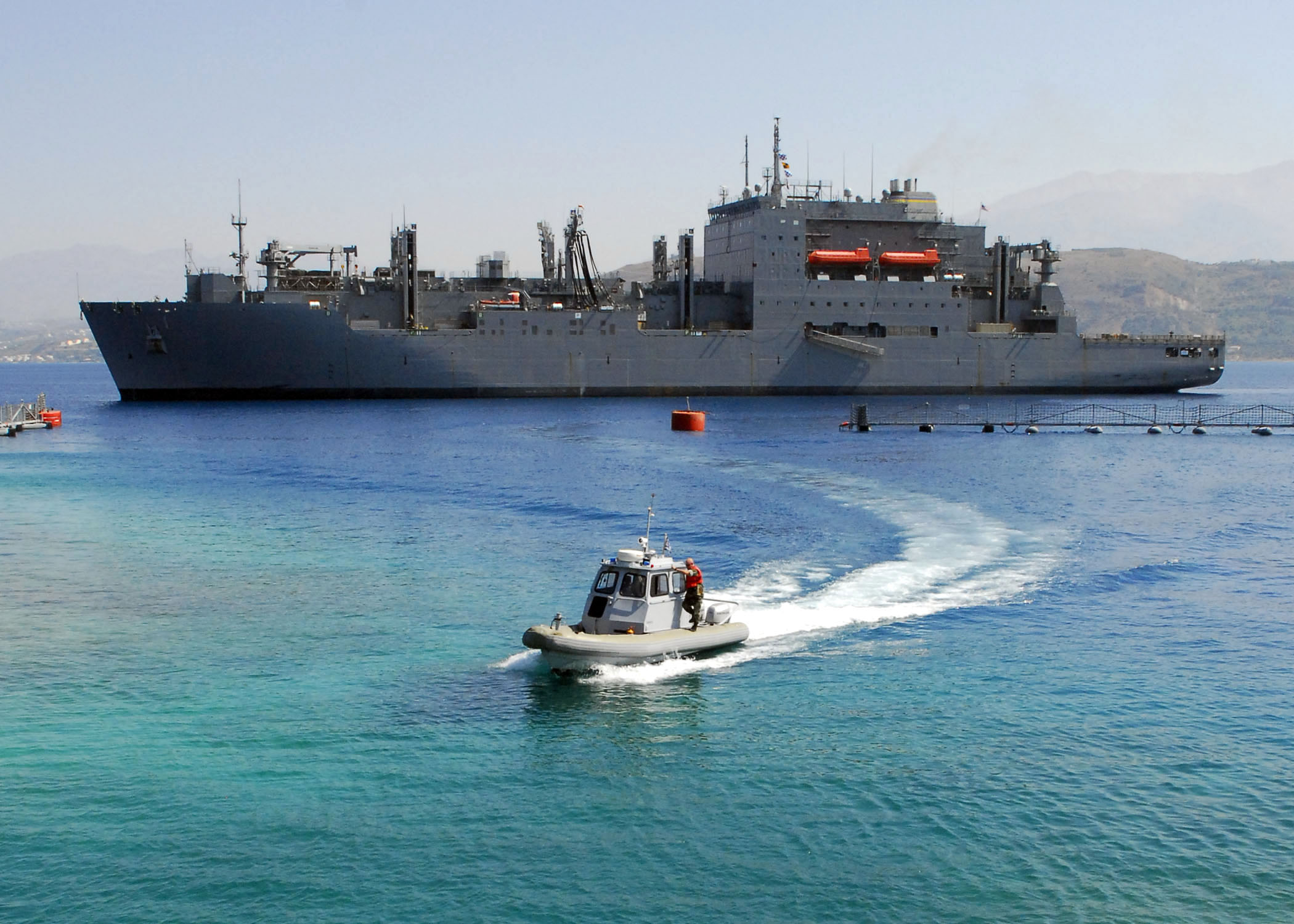
USNS Lewis and Clark at Souda Bay, Crete, Greece, 24 July 2007

The T-AKE is a replenishment naval vessel operated by Military Sealift Command with civilian mariner crews (53 personnel) augmented by a military department (5 personnel). In 2012, Lewis and Clark became one of 14 ships that comprise the United States Marine Corps (USMC) Maritime Prepositioning Program (MPP).

Replenishment ships help allow the Marine Corps maintain a forward presence. Her primary mission is the delivery of supplies to enable the arrival and assembly of a Marine Expeditionary Brigade (MEB). The T-AKE transfers cargo – ammunition, food, fuel, repair parts, ship store items and expendable supplies to Marine and joint forces ashore.

The Navy awarded National Steel and Shipbuilding Company of San Diego, Calif., a $406.9 million competitive contract 18 October 2001, to build the first ship of the class, USNS Lewis and Clark. The Navy also exercised a $301.6 million option in the contract for the construction of the second ship of the class, USNS Sacagawea.

The U.S. Navy had previously fielded a ballistic missile submarine named USS Lewis and Clark (SSBN-644).

== Antipiracy ==
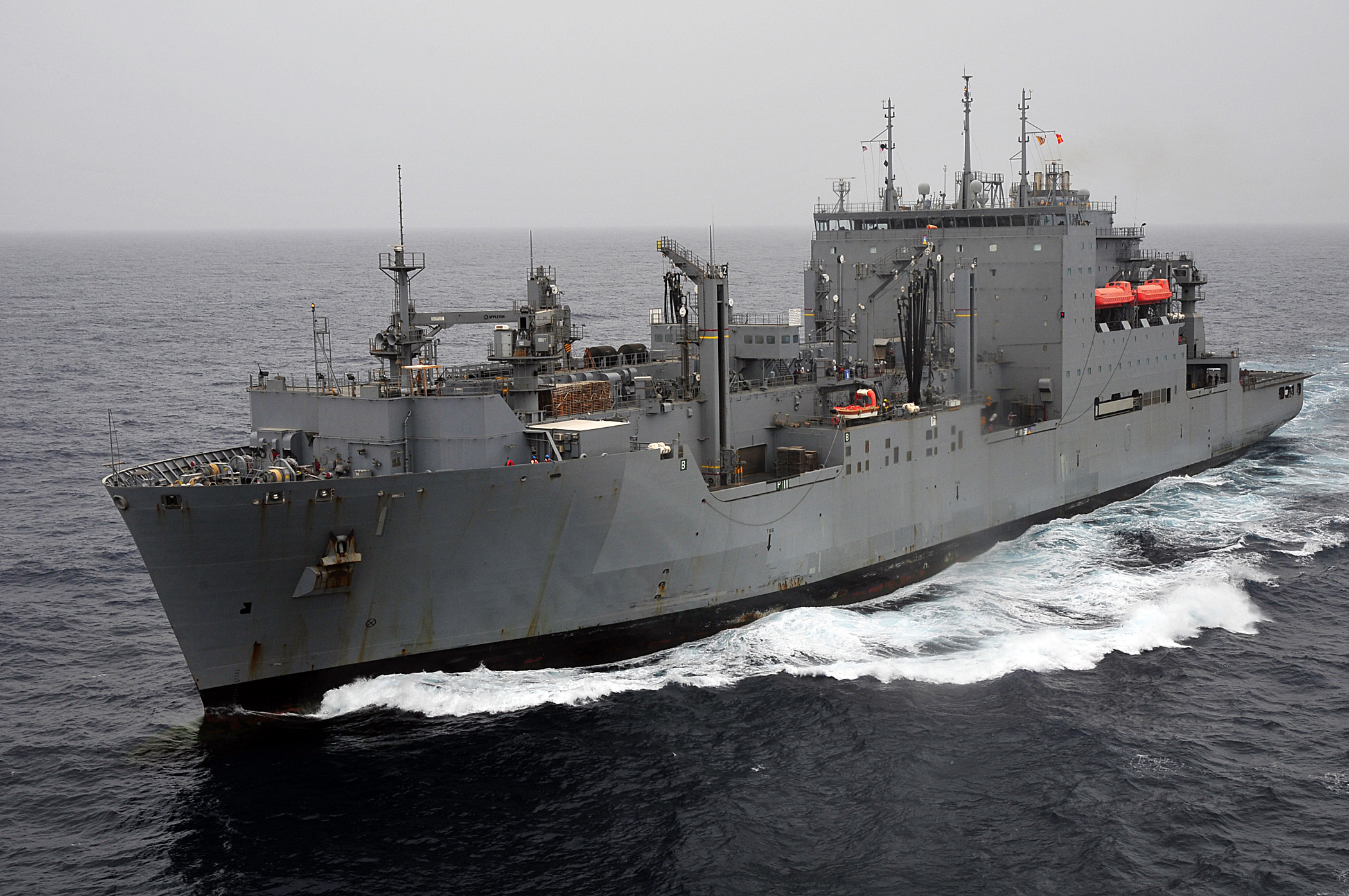
USNS Lewis and Clark (T-AKE 1) underway in the Arabian Sea.

In February 2009, the ship was deployed off the coast of Somalia as part of Operation Enduring Freedom - Horn of Africa. The vessel was fitted out to be used as a prison ship for captured pirates.

On 20 November 2010, the Lewis and Clark responded to a distress call by the Chinese-flagged cargo ship M/V Tai An Kou which was under attack by Somali pirates. Upon sighting the US naval vessel, the pirates opened fire and the Lewis and Clark returned fire in a brief engagement that drove the pirates off without causing any casualties. The destroyer USS Winston S. Churchill then also arrived on the scene 10 hours later and launched a helicopter to provide additional assistance until the PLAN frigate Xuzhou arrived.
