= USNS Richard E. Byrd =

Cargo ship of the United States Navy

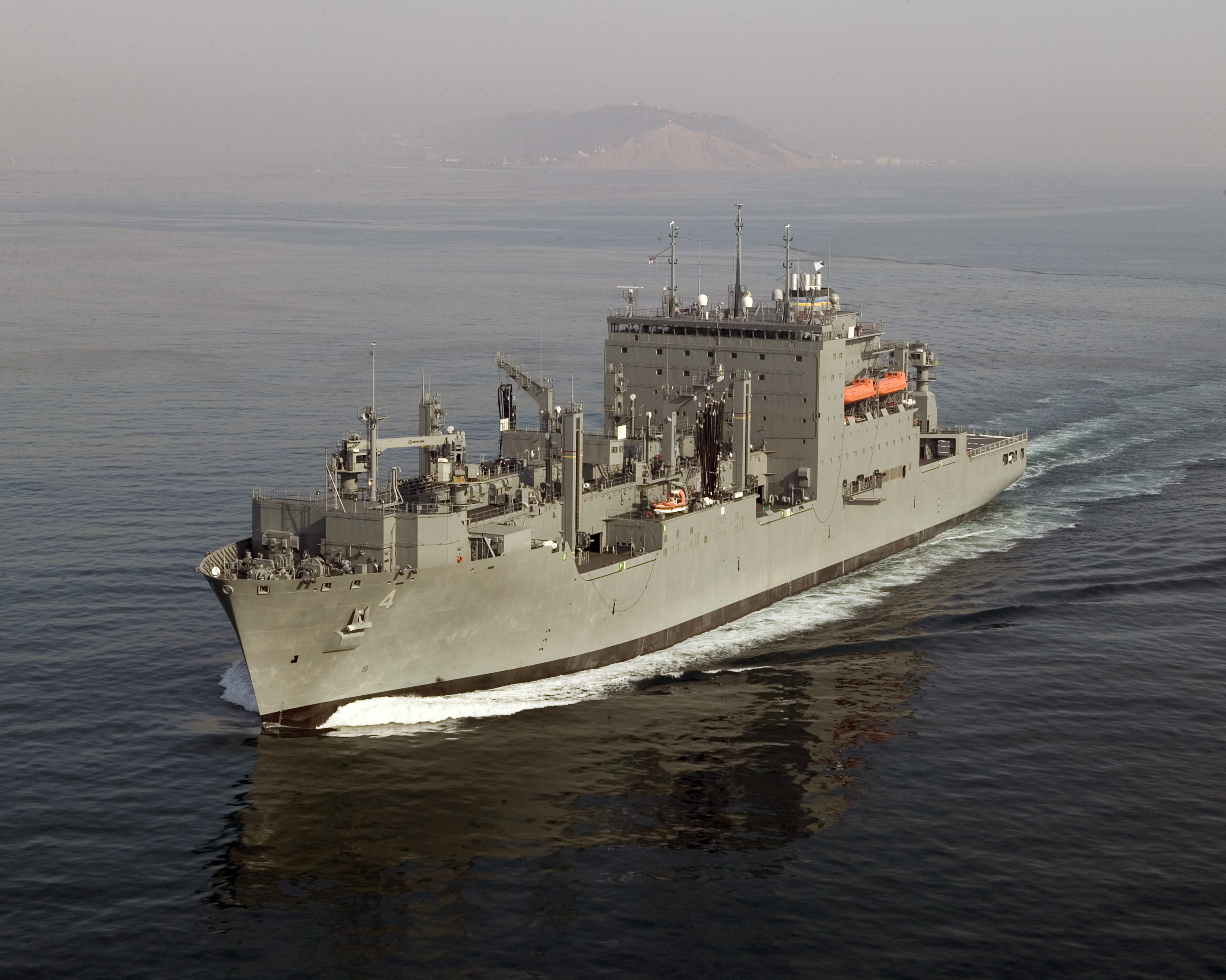
- USNS Richard E. Byrd (T-AKE-4) underway outside San Diego harbor.

History

United States
- Name: Richard E. Byrd
- Namesake: Richard Evelyn Byrd
- Awarded: 18 July 2003
- Builder: National Steel and Shipbuilding
- Laid down: 28 July 2006
- Launched: 15 May 2007
- Completed: 14 November 2007
- In service: 8 January 2008
- Identification: IMO number: 9300609; MMSI number: 369499000; Callsign: NBYR
- Motto: Qua Patet Orbis; (As Far As the World Extends)
- Status: in active service
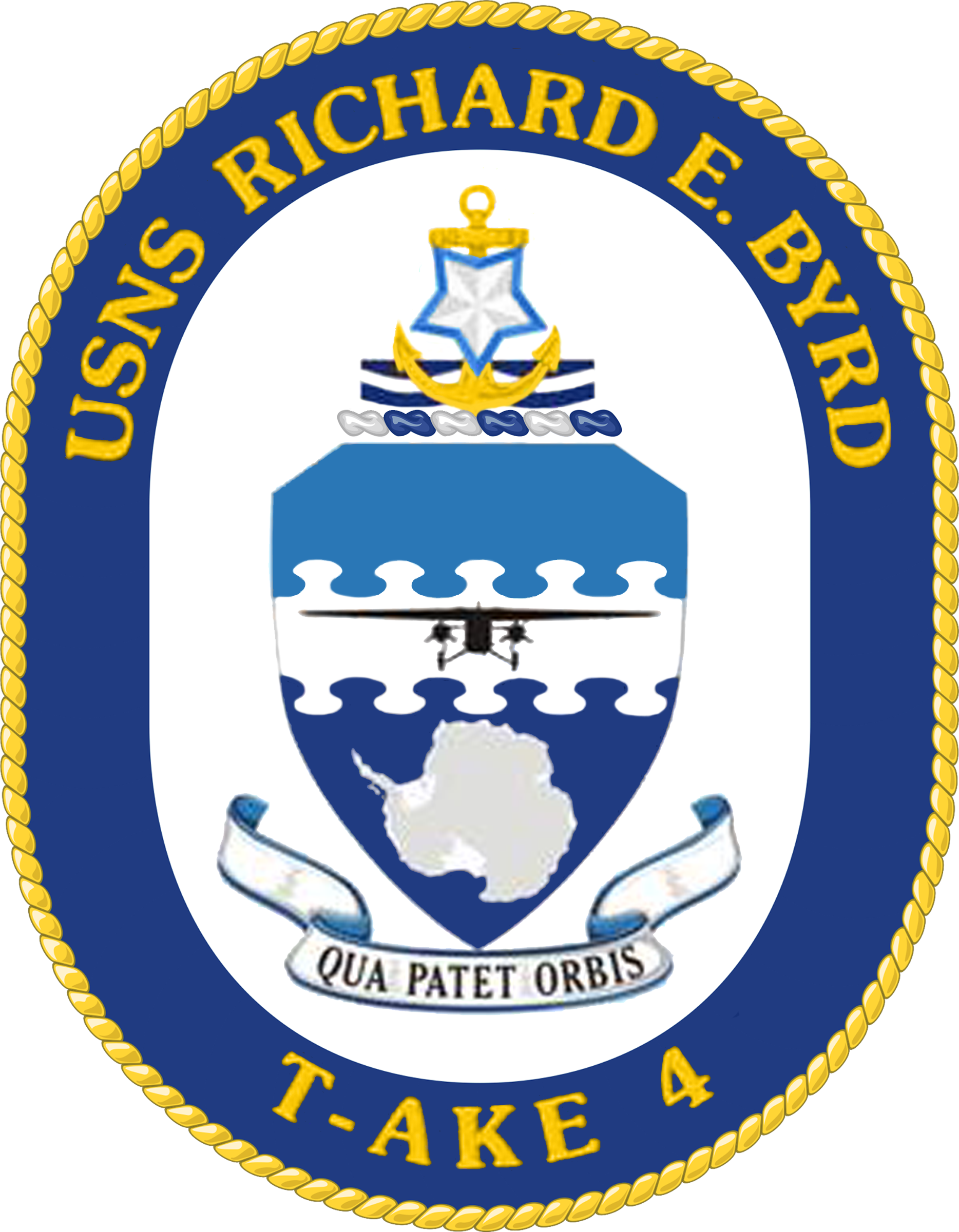
- Badge

General characteristics
- Class & type: Lewis and Clark-class dry cargo ship
- Displacement: 23,852 tons light, 40,298 tons full, 16,446 tons dead
- Length: 210 m (689 ft 0 in) oa; 199.3 m (653 ft 10 in) waterline
- Beam: 32.3 m (106 ft 0 in)
- Draft: 9.1 m (29 ft 10 in) maximum, 9.4 m (30 ft 10 in) limit
- Propulsion: Integrated propulsion and ship service electrical system, with generation at 6.6 kV by FM/MAN B&W diesel generators; one fixed pitch propeller; bow thruster
- Speed: 20 knots (37 km/h; 23 mph)
- Range: 14,000 nmi (26,000 km; 16,000 mi) at 20 kn
- Capacity: Max dry cargo weight: 5,910 long tons (6,000 t); Max dry cargo volume: 783,000 ft^{3} (22,200 m^{3}); Max cargo fuel weight: 2,350 long tons (2,390 t); Cargo fuel volume: 18,000 bbl (2,900 m^{3}); DFM: 10,500 bbl (1,670 m^{3}); JP5: 7,500 bbl (1,190 m^{3})
- Complement: 123 civilian, 12 USN staff
- Aircraft carried: 2 × helicopters, either MH-60S Knighthawk or SA330J Puma

USNS Richard E. Byrd (T-AKE-4) is a Lewis and Clark-class dry cargo ship of the United States Navy. She is the second United States Navy ship to be named after polar explorer Rear Admiral Richard E. Byrd (1888–1957). Built by the National Steel and Shipbuilding Company at San Diego, California, the ship was launched on 15 May 2007. Richard E. Byrd was delivered to Military Sealift Command on 8 January 2008.

== Construction and career ==
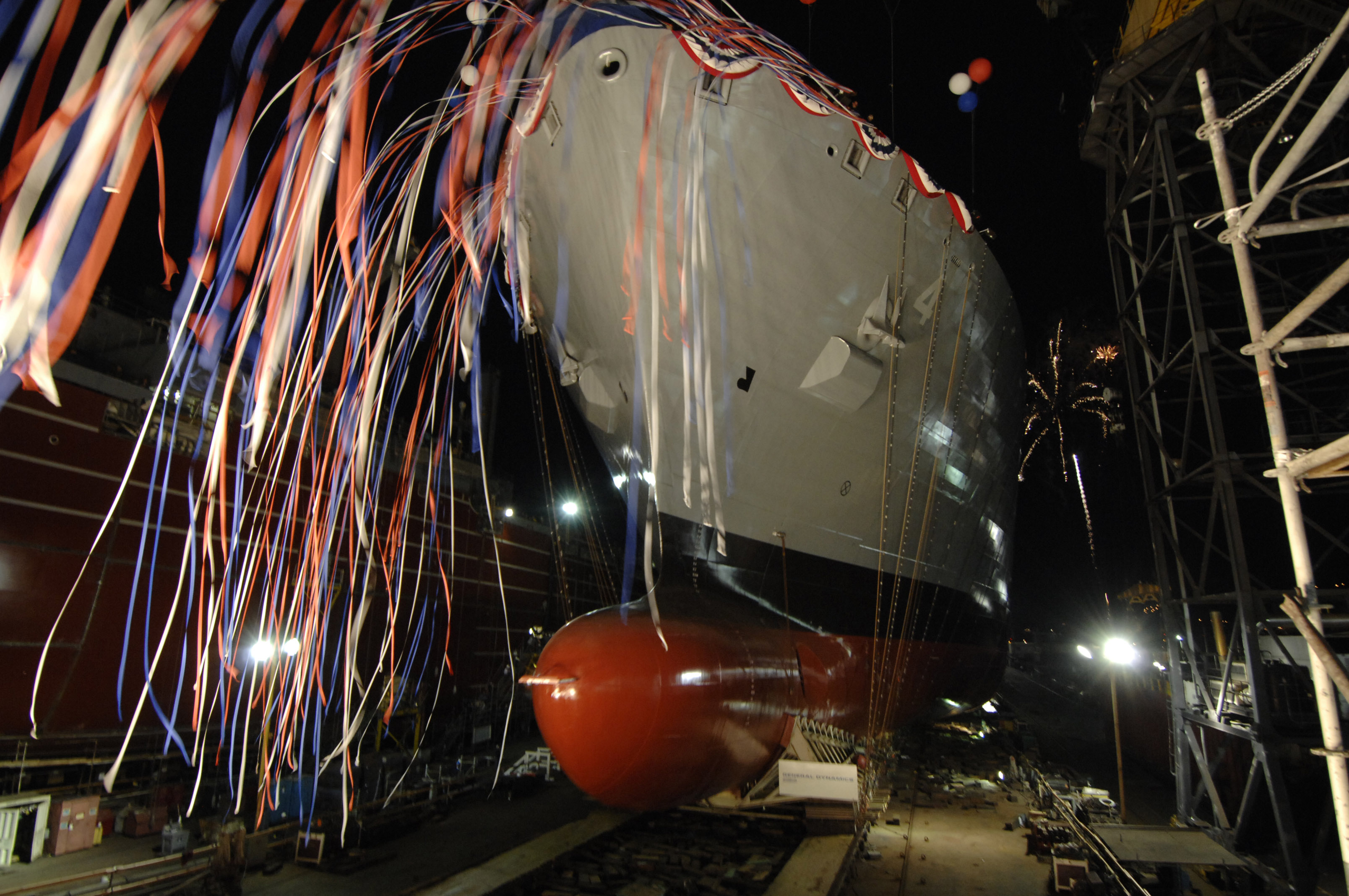
Richard E. Byrd, is launched into the San Diego Harbor after a christening ceremony, 15 May 2007

The contract to build her was awarded to National Steel and Shipbuilding Company (NASSCO) of San Diego, California, on 18 July 2003. She was launched from the building ways into San Diego Bay on the evening of 15 May 2007; Bolling Byrd Clarke, Admiral Byrd's eldest daughter, broke the ceremonial bottle of champagne on the ship's bow to start the launch amid fireworks and fanfare. Construction continued until the U.S. Navy accepted her on 14 November 2007. Additional construction work continued until she was delivered to Military Sealift Command (MSC) for crewing and placed in service on 8 January 2008.

She completed a fitting-out period as well as multiple operational inspections and trials, including a full INSURV inspection on 27 March 2008. A final period of modifications and design alterations was completed during a 70-day availability before full fleet introduction on 25 July 2008. The ship joined the Pacific Fleet and predominantly operates in the Far East and Indian Ocean operation areas.

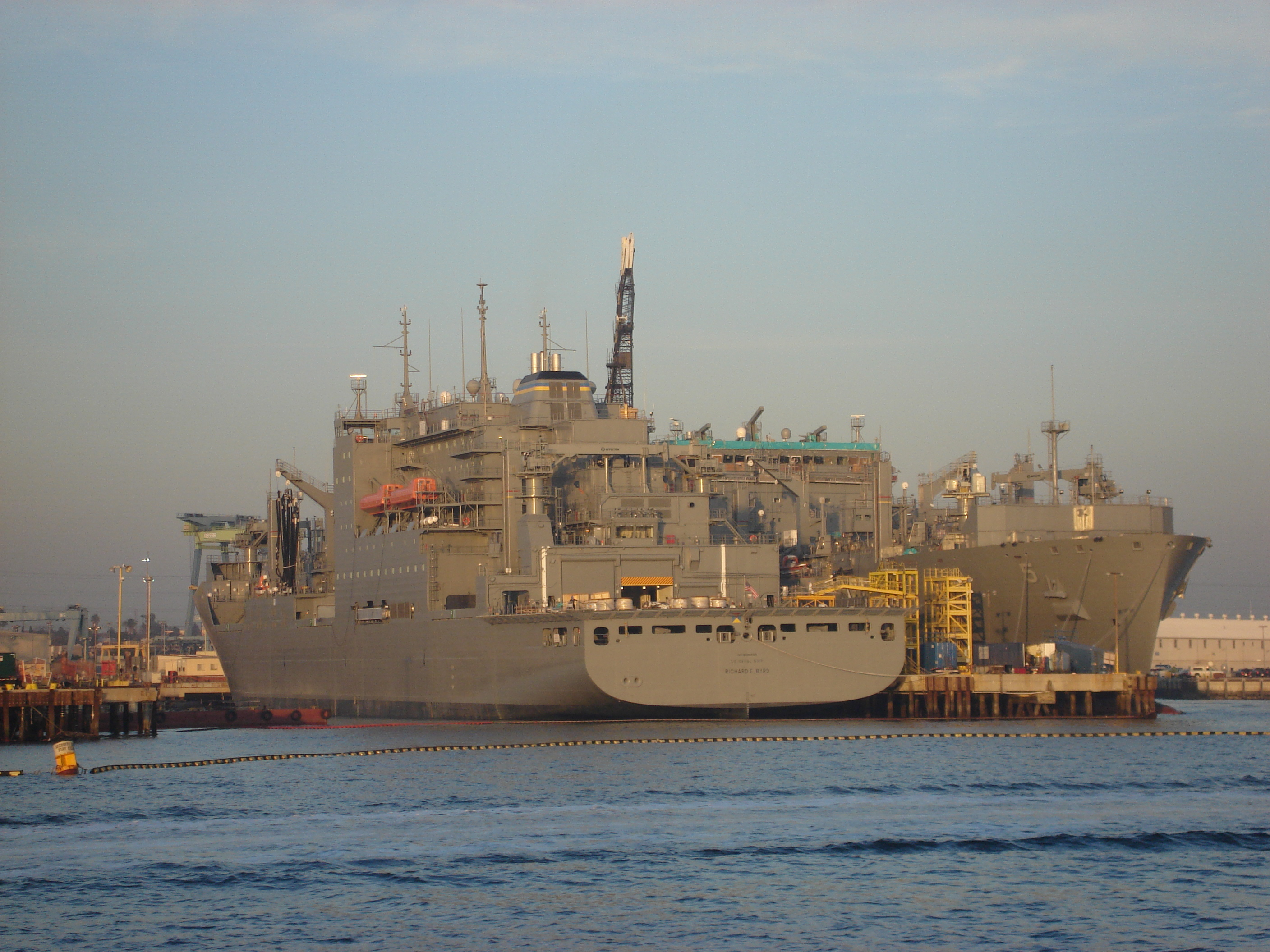
Richard E. Byrd (center) and Robert E. Peary (behind) in dock in San Diego, January 2008

In May 2009, Richard E. Byrd was identified to conduct Pacific Partnership 2009 as a last minute replacement for USS Dubuque, which was sidelined due to an outbreak of H1N1 virus. Pacific Partnership 2009 visited American Samoa, Tonga, New Caledonia, Kiribati (Tarawa), and the Marshall Islands from June to September. In the few weeks after being selected, the ship was outfitted with a quick-designed Reverse Osmosis Unit to make sufficient clean water while loitering in the remote waters and additional logistical items were brought aboard. Richard E. Byrd embarked PHIBRON2 and staff, several NGOs, and allied partners during an at-sea transfer from USNS Amelia Earhart. This embarkation swelled the crew size to over 300 persons, requiring a United States Coast Guard waiver. After completing the mission, the ship offloaded the embarked crew and Reverse Osmosis Unit and returned normal duties. One of those duties included providing Humanitarian Assistance and Disaster Relief efforts to Padang, Indonesia, in October 2009.

In March 2011 during Operation Tomodachi, Richard E. Byrd's embarked SA-330J Puma helicopters airlifted hundreds of pallets of relief supplies to USS Preble and landing dock ships USS Harpers Ferry and USS Tortuga. Richard E. Byrd completed 16 underway replenishment evolutions, delivering 210,000 US gallons (790,000 L; 170,000 imp gal) of fuel to Tomodachi-support ships. In August 2014, the ship rescued nine Yemeni sailors from their stricken dhow in the Sea of Oman.
