= USNS Sacagawea =

Cargo ship of the United States Navy

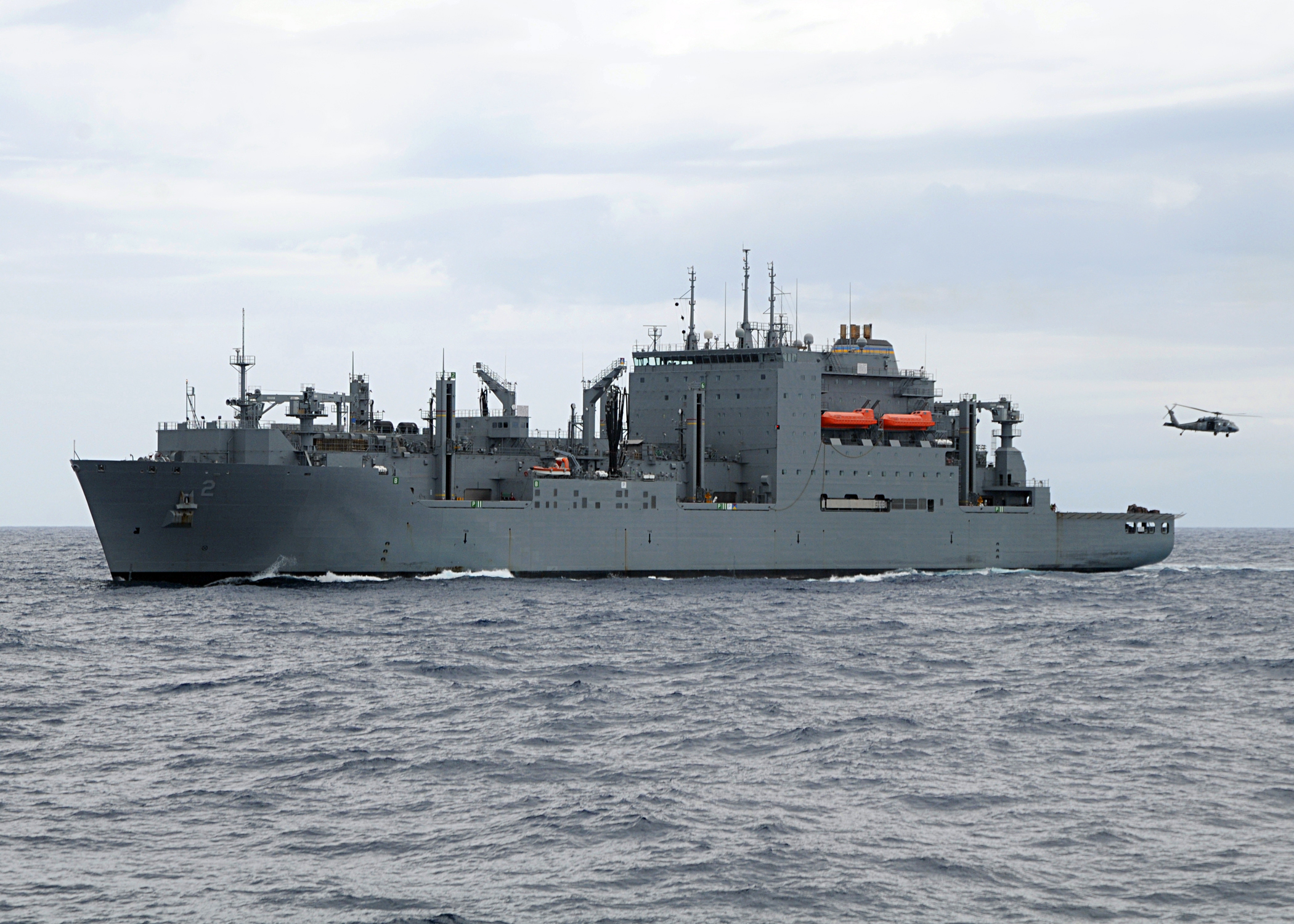
- USNS Sacagawea (T-AKE 2) in 2008

History
- Name: Sacagawea
- Namesake: Sacagawea
- Ordered: 18 October 2001
- Builder: National Steel and Shipbuilding
- Laid down: 15 September 2004
- Launched: 24 June 2006
- In service: 27 February 2007
- Home port: Norfolk, Virginia
- Identification: IMO number: 9271420; MMSI number: 369855000; Callsign: NSAC
- Motto: Leading the Way
- Status: in active service

General characteristics
- Class & type: Lewis and Clark-class cargo ship
- Displacement: 23,852 tons light, 40,298 tons full, 16,446 tons dead
- Length: 210 m (689 ft) overall, 199.3 m (654 ft) waterline
- Beam: 32.3 m (106 ft) extreme, 32.3 m (106 ft) waterline
- Draft: 9.1 m (30 ft) maximum, 9.4 m (31 ft) limit
- Propulsion: Integrated propulsion and ship service electrical system, with generation at 6.6 kV by FM/MAN B&W diesel generators; one fixed pitch propeller; bow thruster
- Speed: 20 knots (37 km/h)
- Range: 14,000 nautical miles at 20 kt; (26,000 km at 37 km/h)
- Capacity: Max dry cargo weight: 5,910 long tons (6,000 t); Max dry cargo volume: 783,000 cubic feet (22,200 cubic metres); Max cargo fuel weight: 2,350 long tons (2,390 t); Cargo fuel volume: 18,000 barrels (2,900 m³); (DFM: 10,500) (JP5:7,500)
- Complement: 49 military, 123 civilian
- Electronic warfare & decoys: Nulka decoy launchers
- Armament: 2–6 × 0.5 in (12.7 mm) machine guns; or 7.62 mm medium machine guns
- Aircraft carried: Two helicopters, either Sikorsky MH-60S Knighthawk or Aerospatiale Puma

USNS Sacagawea (T-AKE-2), a Lewis and Clark-class dry cargo ship, is the third ship operated by the United States Navy to be named for Sacagawea, the Shoshone woman who acted as guide and interpreter for the Lewis and Clark Expedition, and one of the few United States Navy ships named for women.

The contract to build her was awarded to National Steel and Shipbuilding Company (NASSCO) of San Diego, California, on 18 October 2001. Construction began in September 2004 for a scheduled delivery in early 2007.

She was launched in June 2006. Two of Sacagawea's descendants, Lucy Diaz and Rachel Ariwite, were the ship's sponsors. USNS Sacagawea is one of 14 Lewis and Clark-class ships and is part of the 14 ships that comprise the United States Marine Corps Maritime Prepositioning Program.

In January 2013, USNS Sacagawea was transferred to the Maritime Prepositioning Squadron Three (MPSRON-3) in Saipan. Within days of her arrival, she participated in Exercise Freedom Banner in the Republic of the Philippines. Freedom Banner is the only annually funded Maritime Prepositioning Force exercise in the Marine Corps and continues to be a proving ground for concept validation.

During Freedom Banner 13, the Marine Air Ground Task Force (MAGTF) used both vertical connectors in the form of MV-22 Osprey aircraft, and surface connectors in the form of landing craft, utility (LCU), and landing craft, mechanized, "Mike 8" (LCM-8) boats loaded aboard USNS 1st Lt. Jack Lummus. These dedicated ship-to-shore connectors not only enabled the standup of the MAGTF, but also provided sustainment to exercise forces ashore during the conduct of the exercise.

This vessel is the only USNS Sacagawea. However, other U.S. Navy vessels have been named USS Sacagawea.

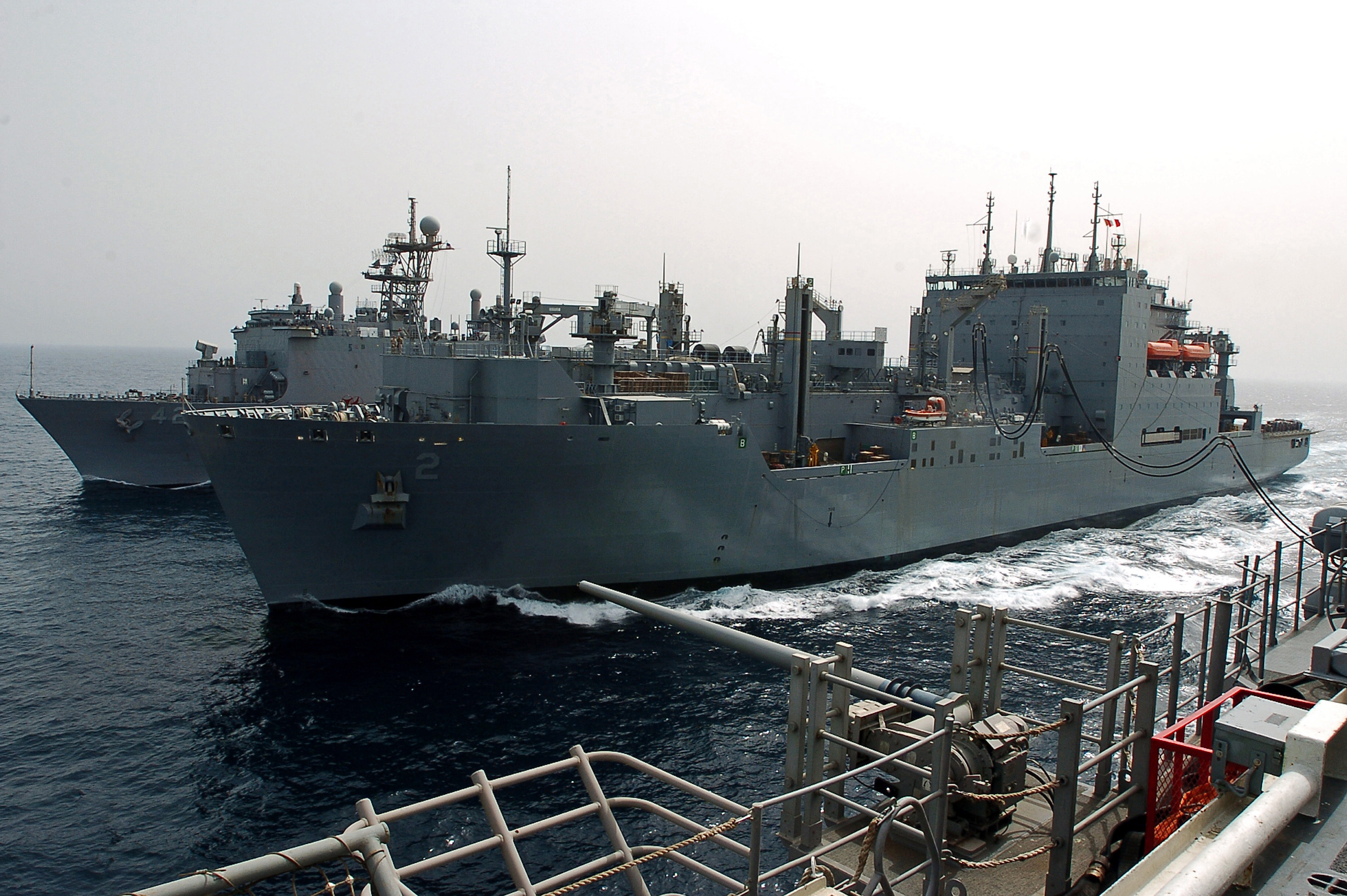
Sacagawea conducts an underway replenishment with the amphibious assault ship USS Tarawa (LHA-1), front, and the dock landing ship USS Germantown (LSD-42) in the Persian Gulf, 18 March 2008.
