= Jack Lummus =

US Marine Corps recipient of the Medal of Honor and football player (1915–1945)

Andrew Jackson Lummus Jr.
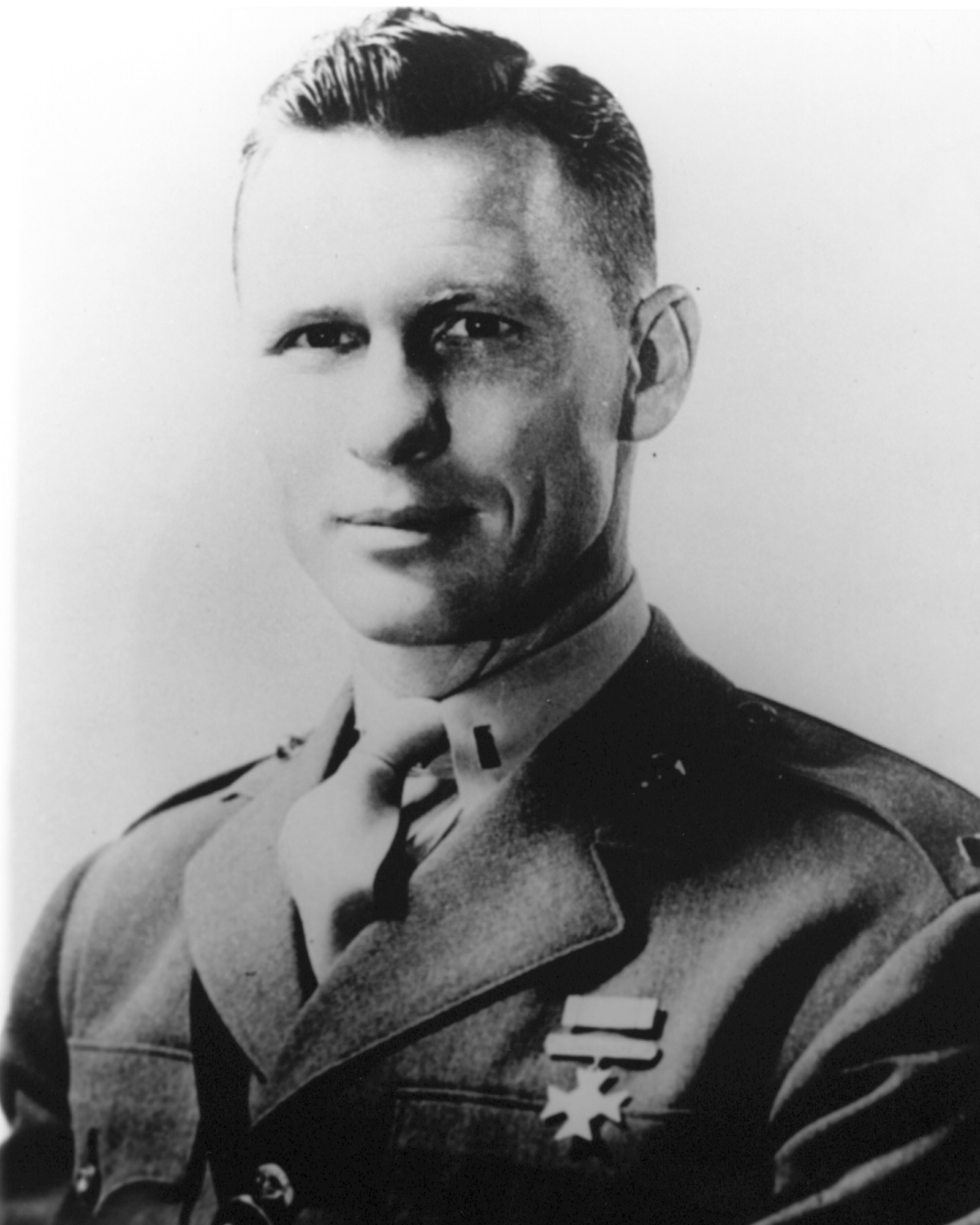
- 1st Lt. Jack Lummus, Medal of Honor recipient
- Born: October 22, 1915; Ellis County, Texas, U.S.
- Died: March 8, 1945 (aged 29); Iwo Jima, Volcano Islands, Japanese Empire
- Burial place: Initially Fifth Division Cemetery later moved to Ennis, Texas, now rests in Texas State Cemetery located in Austin, Texas
- Military career
- Allegiance: United States
- Branch: United States Marine Corps
- Service years: 1942–1945
- Rank: First Lieutenant
- Nickname: Jack
- Units: Marine Raiders; 27th Marine Regiment; 5th Marine Division; V Amphibious Corps
- Conflicts: World War II; Volcano and Ryukyu Islands campaign; Battle of Iwo Jima †
- Awards: Medal of Honor; Purple Heart
- Football career

No. 29
- Position: End

Personal information
- Listed height: 6 ft 3 in (1.91 m)
- Listed weight: 194 lb (88 kg)

Career information
- High school: Ennis High School; Texas Military College
- College: Baylor

Career history
- New York Giants (1941)

Awards and highlights
- New York Giants Ring of Honor

Career statistics
- Games played: 9
- Receptions: 1
- Receiving yards: 5
- Stats at Pro Football Reference

Andrew Jackson Lummus Jr. (October 22, 1915 – March 8, 1945) was an American professional football player and an officer in the U.S. Marine Corps. He was a two-sport athlete at Baylor University. Lummus played as an end for the New York Giants of the National Football League (NFL). He fought, and died, at the Battle of Iwo Jima during World War II and received the Medal of Honor for his valor.

== Biography ==
He was born in Ellis County, Texas, on a cotton farm, the youngest child and only son of four children born to Andrew Jackson Lummus, Sr., and Laura Francis Lummus.

He attended Ennis High School from September 1931 through May 1934, where he was a star in football and track. He received all-district honors for football in his sophomore and junior years. He dropped out before the end of his senior year due to the views of his family that the cost of graduating, such as buying a picture and gown, were too wasteful considering the ongoing Depression. This may also have been affected by a case of influenza he contracted. He finished his high-school education at Texas Military College on a two-year sports scholarship and won all-conference honors for his participation in football.

He graduated on May 28, 1937, receiving scholarship offers from Baylor University and Tulane University. He enrolled at Baylor on September 14, 1937. There, he was an All-Southwest Conference center fielder for three years and an outstanding end on the football team. Those three years, the Bears finished third in baseball, and Lummus was considered to be the best center fielder who had ever played for Baylor.

In football, he played first-string end wearing number 53. For two consecutive years, he was nominated by the Associated Press to the All-American team, and in 1938, he made honorable mention for the team. He was sometimes compared to Sam Boyd. Before he left Baylor, he signed a minor league baseball contract with the Wichita Falls Spudders, and uniform player's contract with the New York Giants.

On May 26, 1941, an Army Air Corps recruiter came to the school. Lummus and 25 other students enlisted in the Air Corps and signed up for a civilian flying school as a result of this visit. While waiting for the Air Corps to call him, Lummus inexplicably dropped out of Baylor; he was going to graduate soon, and his academic records showed satisfactory grades. The ongoing war in Europe was thought to have influenced this decision.

After dropping out, Lummus joined the Class D Spudders of the West Texas–New Mexico League. He played right and center field. On July 6, 1941, he played his 26th, and last, game for the Spudders. The Army Air Corps had called on him to honor his enlistment papers. In those 26 games, he had a .257 batting average.

Lummus reported to Hicks Field, 40 miles northwest of Fort Worth, Texas, to enroll in the flight school there that was licensed by the Army but run by civilians. While making his first solo flight, he flew the flight plan and landed without flaw. While taxiing on the runway, however, he accidentally clipped a fence with his wingtip, washing him out of flight school.

== New York Giants football career ==
He then traveled to the New York Giants' training camp in Superior, Wisconsin. As one of the 30 players who made the Giants' roster, he wore number 29. He had signed on as a free agent and received a $100 monthly salary. He made the team as a rookie end and played in nine games.

On December 7, 1941, the Giants were playing their archrival the Brooklyn Dodgers. Around halftime, the Associated Press ticker in the press box gave out a message saying, "Airplanes identified as Japanese have attacked the American Naval Base at Pearl Harbor." The players continued the game, knowing nothing of the attack. The Giants lost but went on to play the Chicago Bears in the NFL championship game.

On October 11, 2015, the Giants honored Lummus by inducting him into the New York Giants Ring of Honor.

== Military career ==
After the championship game, Lummus enlisted in the Marine Corps Reserve on January 30, 1942. After finishing basic training at the Mainside Recruit Training Center in San Diego, California, he was assigned to Camp Elliott, 10 miles north of San Diego. There, he joined the Devildogs, the San Diego Marine Corps baseball club.

In May 1942, he was sent to the busy seaport of Mare Island as a military policeman; he joined another baseball club. On June 10, he was promoted to private first class, and two months later, he was promoted to corporal. On October 18, he enrolled at the Officers Training School at Quantico, Virginia. He graduated on December 18 and received a commission as a second lieutenant. He was sent back to California and was assigned to the elite Marine Raiders at Camp Pendleton. When the Marine Raiders were dissolved, he was assigned to the 27th Marines, 5th Marine Division.

In January 1944, he was assigned as executive officer, Company F, 2nd Battalion, 27th Marines. In August 1944, the division was transferred to Camp Tarawa outside of Waimea, Hawaii. Lummus boarded the USS Henry Clay for the trip. After four months of training, the division was assigned to the V Amphibious Corps and would fight to take the island of Iwo Jima.

== Iwo Jima ==
Lummus was in the first wave of troops to land at Iwo Jima on February 19, 1945. He landed at 09:00 on the beach known as Red One. His platoon and he spent the next two weeks incessantly fighting the dug-in Japanese.

His initial duty was a liaison officer for the Second Battalion, spotting targets on the slopes of Mount Suribachi for artillery and air strikes. On March 6, he was given command of Company E's third rifle platoon. On March 8, his platoon was spearheading a final assault on an objective east of Kitano Point, near the northern edge of the island. Despite minor wounds received from grenade fragments, Lummus knocked out three enemy strongholds, well-fortified positions arranged to defend each other, which were preventing his platoon from reaching its objective. Following this action, he stepped on a land mine and was mortally wounded, losing his legs. While lying on the ground, he urged his platoon on, until he was carried off to an aid station.

At the aid station, he famously told the doctor, Thomas M. Brown, "Well, doc, the New York Giants lost a mighty good end today." He was transferred to the field hospital, where he underwent surgery and a transfusion of 18 pints of blood, but died of internal wounds on the operating table. He was buried in plot five, row 13, grave 1,244 in the Fifth Division Cemetery. His body was later moved to Ennis, Texas.

In a letter to his mother, Lummus' commanding officer wrote:

Jack suffered very little for he didn't live long. I saw Jack soon after he was hit. With calmness, serenity and complacency, Jack said, 'The New York Giants lost a good man.' We all lost a good man.

== Medal of Honor citation ==
His Medal of Honor citation reads:

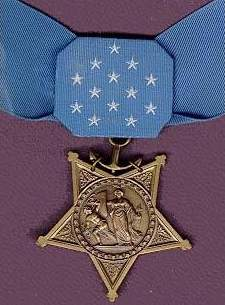
Medal of Honor

For conspicuous gallantry and intrepidity at the risk of his life above and beyond the call of duty as leader of a Rifle Platoon attached to the 2d Battalion, 27th Marines, 5th Marine Division, in action against enemy Japanese forces on Iwo Jima in the Volcano Islands, 8 March 1945. Resuming his assault tactics with bold decision after fighting without respite for 2 days and nights, 1st Lt. Lummus slowly advanced his platoon against an enemy deeply entrenched in a network of mutually supporting positions. Suddenly halted by a terrific concentration of hostile fire, he unhesitatingly moved forward of his front lines in an effort to neutralize the Japanese position. Although knocked to the ground when an enemy grenade exploded close by, he immediately recovered himself and, again moving forward despite the intensified barrage, quickly located, attacked, and destroyed the occupied emplacement. Instantly taken under fire by the garrison of a supporting pillbox and further assailed by the slashing fury of hostile rifle fire, he fell under the impact of a second enemy grenade but, courageously disregarding painful shoulder wounds, staunchly continued his heroic 1-man assault and charged the second pillbox, annihilating all the occupants. Subsequently returning to his platoon position, he fearlessly traversed his lines under fire, encouraging his men to advance and directing the fire of supporting tanks against other stubbornly holding Japanese emplacements. Held up again by a devastating barrage, he again moved into the open, rushed a third heavily fortified installation and killed the defending troops. Determined to crush all resistance, he led his men indomitably, personally attacking foxholes and spider traps with his carbine and systematically reducing the fanatic opposition until, stepping on a land mine, he sustained fatal wounds. By his outstanding valor, skilled tactics, and tenacious perseverance in the face of overwhelming odds, 1st Lt. Lummus had inspired his stouthearted marines to continue the relentless drive northward, thereby contributing materially to the success of his regimental mission. His dauntless leadership and unwavering devotion to duty throughout sustain and enhance the highest traditions of the U.S. Naval Service. He gallantly gave his life in the service of his country.

== Awards and decorations ==

1st row	Medal of Honor		
2nd row	Purple Heart	Combat Action Ribbon	Presidential Unit Citation
3rd row	American Campaign Medal	Asiatic-Pacific Campaign Medal with 2 Campaign stars	World War II Victory Medal

== Memorial ==
A statue of Jack Lummus was unveiled on November 28, 2020, on the Baylor campus of and installed in its current located near McLane Stadium. The statue was provided by Haag (BBA '88) and Millette Sherman of Houston. The statue is the work of Dan Brook (BA '83), and according to the university, it was created to honor Jack Lummus and remind future generations of the rich tradition of bravery among Baylor alumni.

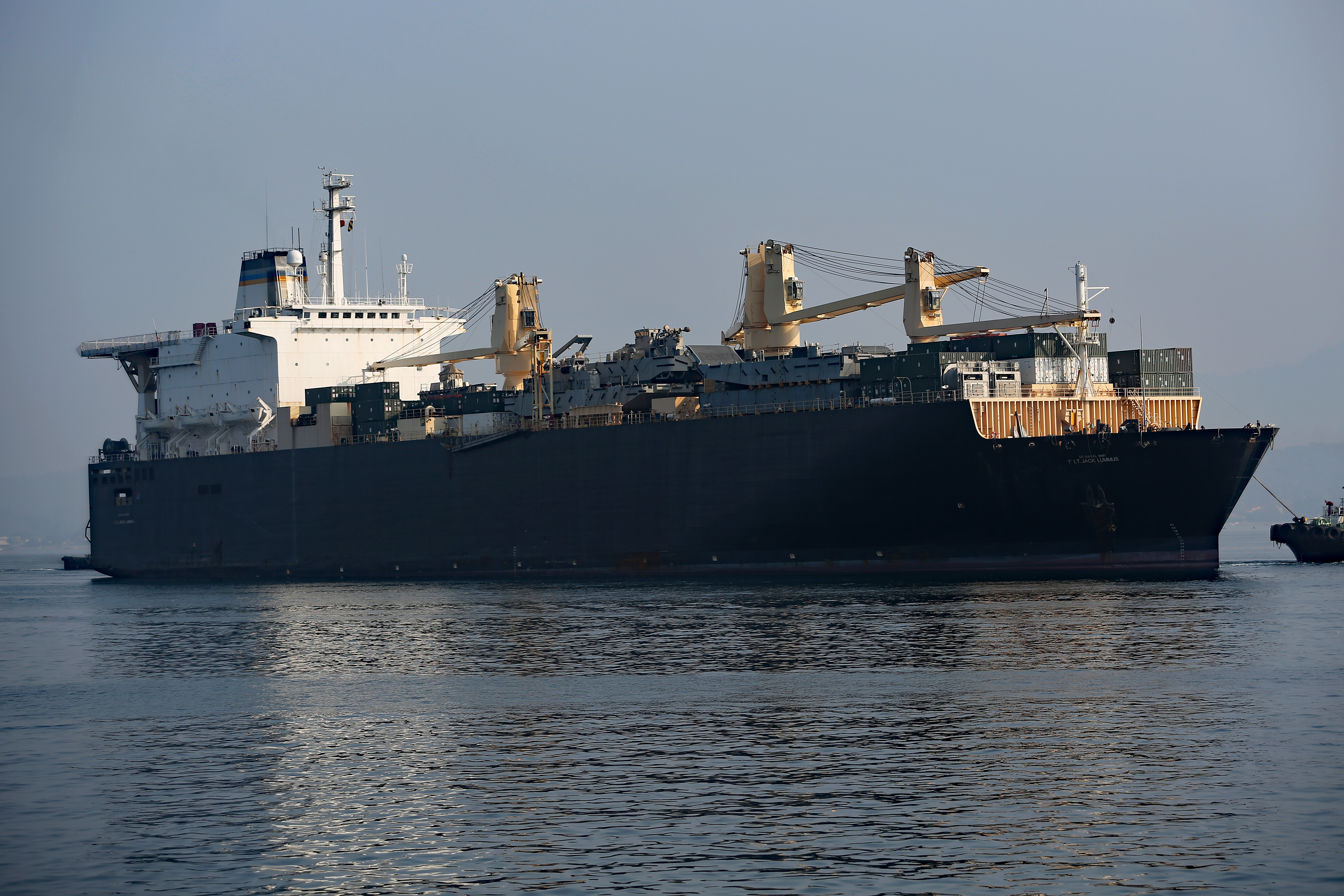
USNS 1st Lt. Jack Lummus (T-AK-3011) arriving at Subic Bay (2016)

== See also ==
- List of Medal of Honor recipients
- List of Medal of Honor recipients for World War II
- List of Medal of Honor recipients for the Battle of Iwo Jima
