= USNS 1st Lt. Jack Lummus =

2nd Lt. John P. Bobo-class dry cargo ship

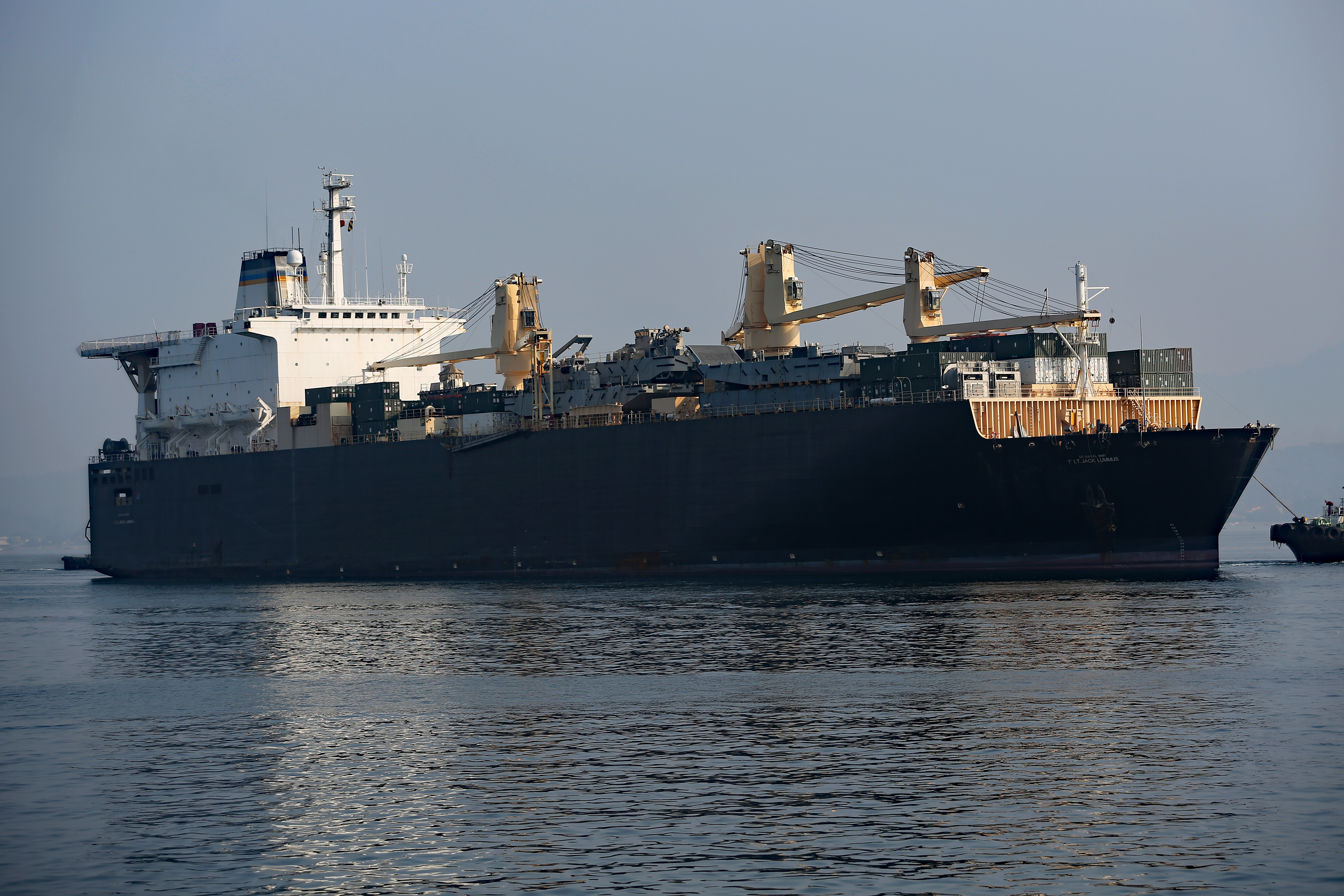
- USNS 1st Lt. Jack Lummus

History

United States
- Name: 1st Lt. Jack Lummus
- Namesake: Jack Lummus
- Owner: American Overseas Marine (1986–2007); Military Sealift Command (2007–present)
- Builder: Fore River Shipyard
- Laid down: June 1984
- Launched: 22 February 1986
- Acquired: 6 March 1986
- Reclassified: from AK-2011, 2006
- Identification: IMO number: 8302454; MMSI number: 367384000; Callsign: NHNN; Hull number: T-AK-3011
- Status: Active

General characteristics
- Class & type: 2nd Lt. John P. Bobo-class dry cargo ship
- Displacement: 44,330 t (43,630 long tons), full
- Length: 672 ft 6 in (204.98 m)
- Beam: 106 ft 0 in (32.31 m)
- Draft: 29 ft 5 in (8.97 m)
- Installed power: 1 × shaft; 27,000 hp (20,000 kW)
- Propulsion: 2 × Werkspoor 16TM410 diesel engines
- Speed: 18 knots (33 km/h; 21 mph)
- Capacity: 162,500 sq. ft. vehicle; 1,605,000 gallons petroleum; 81,700 gallons water; 522 TEU
- Complement: 55 mariners
- Aircraft carried: 1 × Sikorsky CH-53E
- Aviation facilities: Helipad

USNS 1st Lt. Jack Lummus (T-AK-3011), formerly MV 1st Lt. Jack Lummus (AK-3011), is the fourth ship of the 2nd Lt. John P. Bobo-class cargo ship built in 1986. The ship is named after First Lieutenant Jack Lummus, an American Marine who was awarded the Medal of Honor during World War II.

== Construction and commissioning ==
The ship was laid down in June 1984 and launched on 22 February 1985 at the Fore River Shipyard, Quincy, Massachusetts, and later acquired on 6 March 1986 by the Maritime Administration for operation by American Overseas Marine.

From 2 August 1990 until 28 February 1991, the ship took part in Operation Desert Storm by transporting equipments and supplies. Jack Lummus also participated in Operation Restore Hope from 5 December 1992 until 4 May 1993 and became the first ship to arrive in Mogadishu.

The ship was anchored off Sattahip, during Exercise Cobra Gold 2002. On 17 January 2006, the ship was purchased by the Military Sealift Command and was put into the Prepositioning Program and the Maritime Prepositioning Ship Squadron 3. The ship operates in the Pacific Ocean, between Guam and Saipan.

She also took part in Exercise Cobra Gold 2011. In 2015, nearly 50 Marines with Combat Logistics Regiment 25, 2nd Marine Logistics Group were assigned to Jack Lummus. The ship took part in Exercise Freedom Banner 2013. On 29 March 2016, Jack Lummus arrived at Subic Bay for Exercise Balikatan 2016. From 24 to 28 May 2018, the ship carried equipments and supplies to support Exercise Balikatan 2018.

== Gallery ==
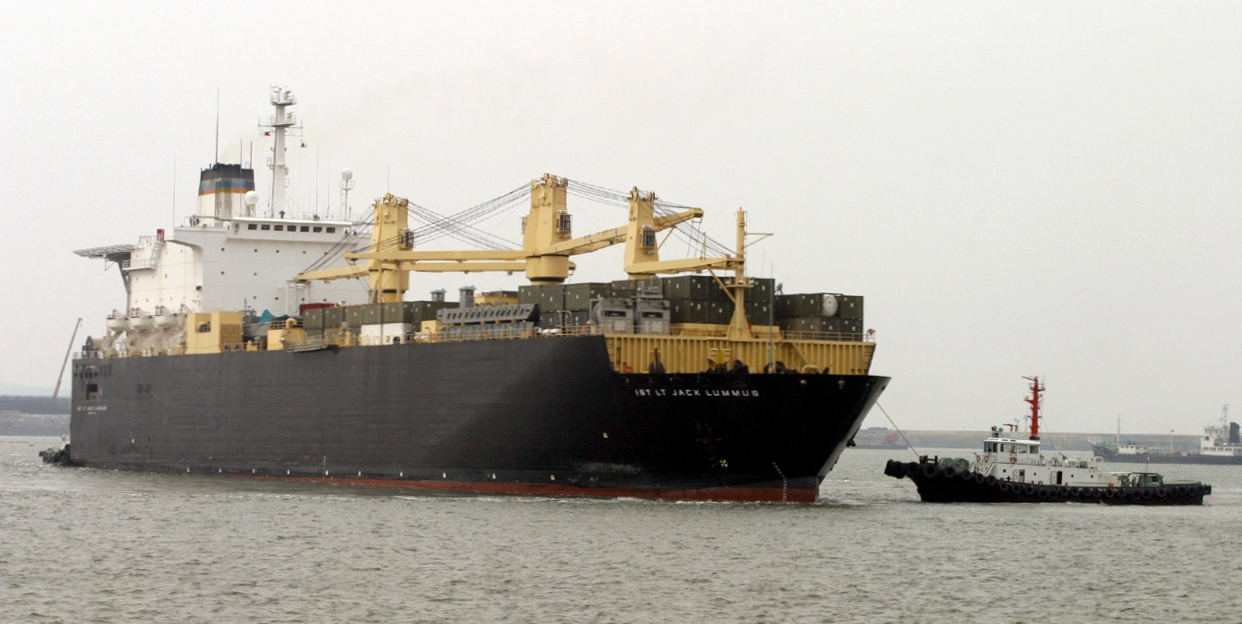
Starboard view of 1st Lt. Jack Lummus on 8 March 2004

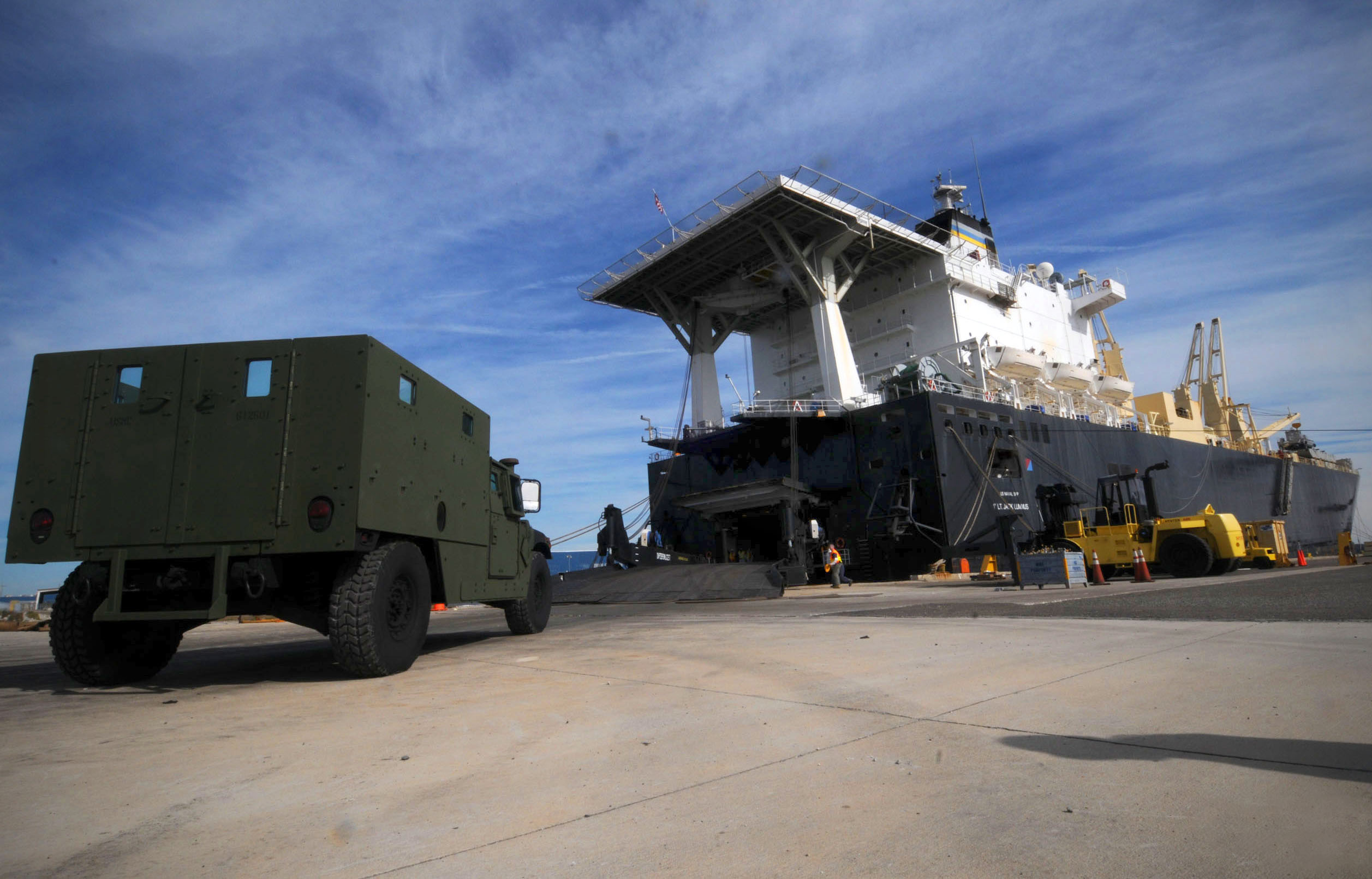
View of 1st Lt. Jack Lummus from the aft on 18 January 2010

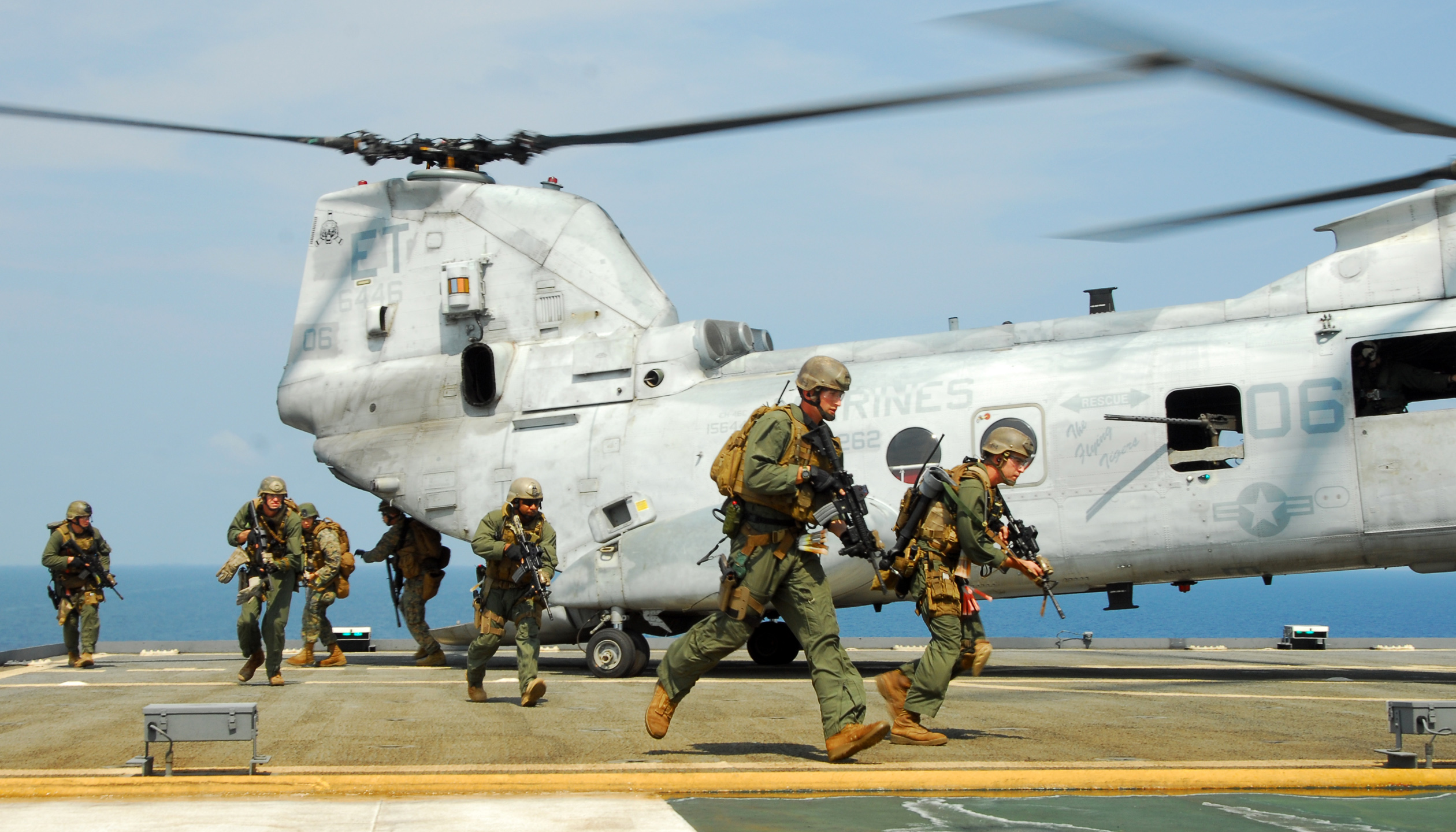
CH-46 on board the ship during Cobra Gold 2011

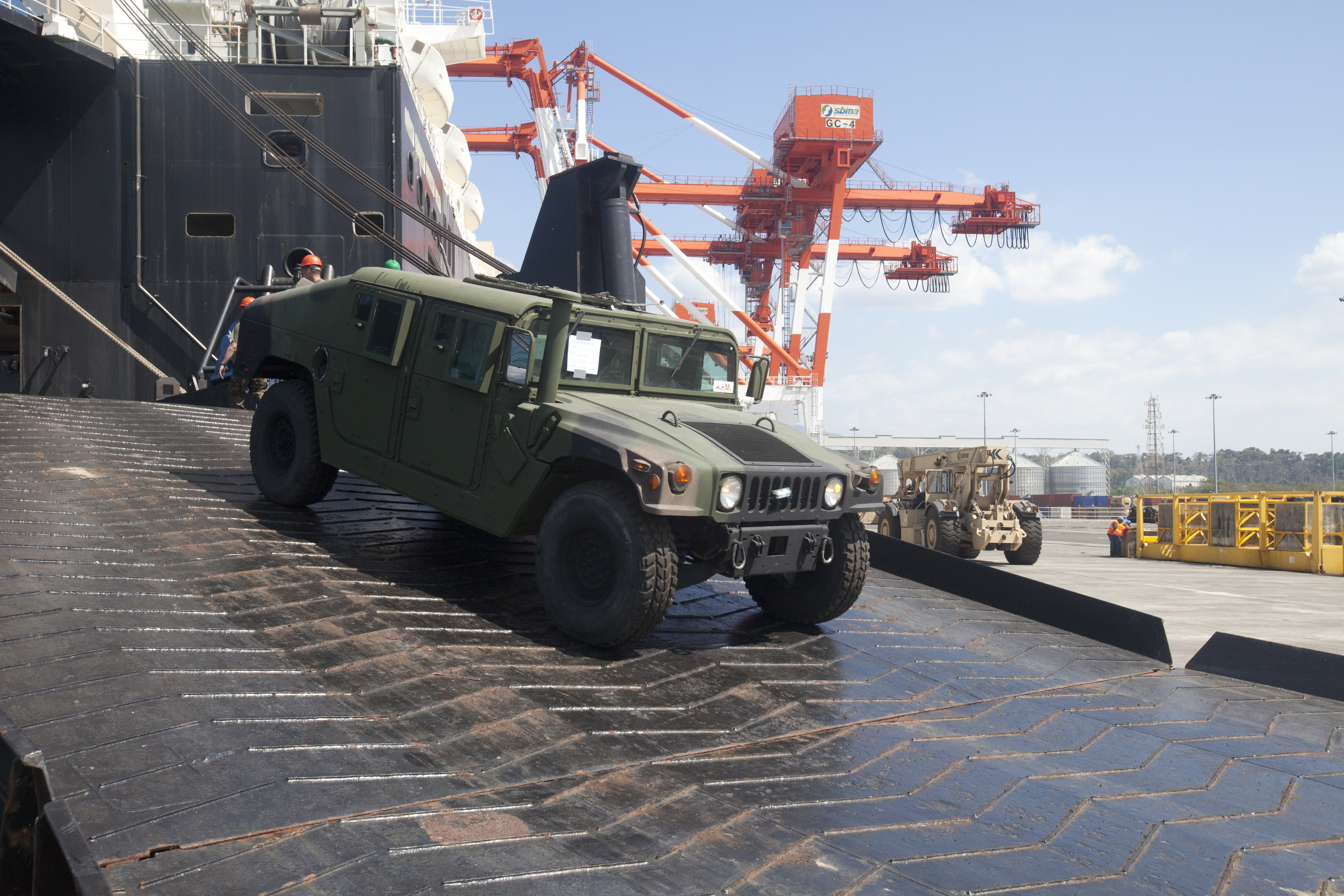
A humvee unloads from the ship during Exercise Freedom Banner 2013
