= Margaret H. Woodward =

United States Air Force general

Margaret Woodward
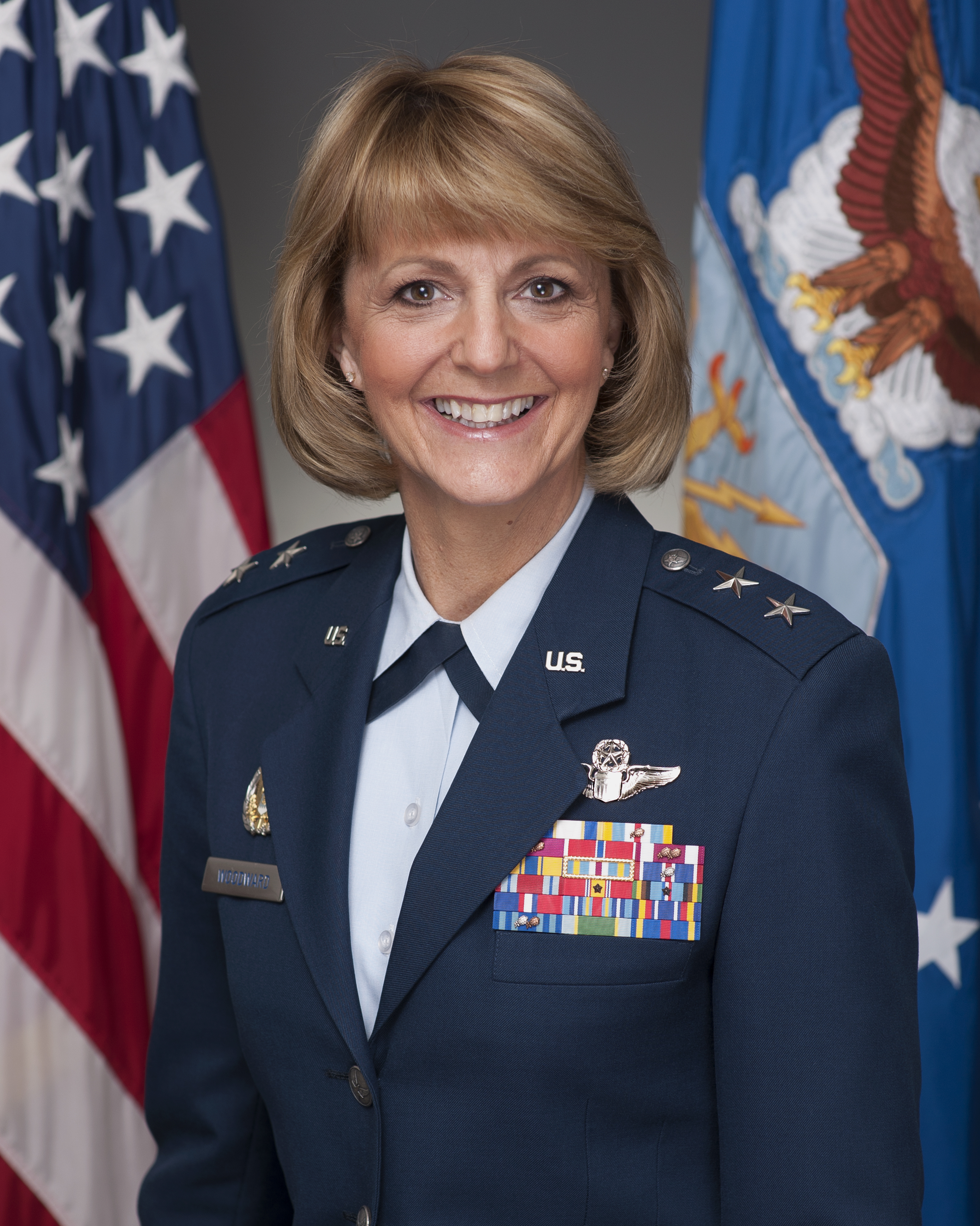
- Born: 1960 (age 65–66)
- Allegiance: United States of America
- Branch: United States Air Force
- Service years: 1982–2014
- Rank: Major General
- Commands: 17th Air Force; 89th Airlift Wing
- Conflicts: Invasion of Panama; Operation Allied Force; Operation Northern Watch; Operation Southern Watch; Operation Enduring Freedom; Iraq War; Operation Odyssey Dawn

Margaret H. Woodward (born 1960) is an American former military officer and major general in the United States Air Force.

As commander of the 17th Air Force and U.S. Air Forces Africa, Ramstein Air Base, Germany, she was responsible for all US air actions that involved Africa. In March 2011, she commanded the air component of the US contribution to the no-fly zone over Libya, sanctioned by the United Nations, making her the first woman to oversee a U.S. combat air campaign.

She retired on April 1, 2014.

== Early life and education ==
Woodward was born in 1960 and grew up in India and Pakistan, where her father worked for the United States Agency for International Development. She left the region when she was about ten years old.

== Career ==
In 1982, Woodward graduated from the Arizona State University and joined the U.S. Air Force the year after. For most of her career she flew aerial refueling aircraft such as the Boeing KC-135 Stratotanker, though she also has experience in the Boeing C-40 Clipper, the C-37 military version of the Gulfstream G550, and the T-37 and T-38 trainers. She was involved the U.S. invasion of Panama, Operation Allied Force, Operations Northern and Southern Watch, Operation Enduring Freedom and missions during the Iraq War.

In 2007, she became commander of the 89th Airlift Wing, which includes responsibility for Air Force One, and in June 2010 became commander of the Seventeenth Air Force, the U.S. Air Force branch of the United States Africa Command. As such, she was the operational commander for the U.S. involvement in the 2011 military intervention in Libya, dubbed Operation Odyssey Dawn, before command of the whole operation was transferred to NATO.

After handing over command of Seventeenth Air Force, she was posted Stateside. Her Air Force official profile lists her appointments since as:

- May 2012 - September 2012, Acting Director, Operational Planning, Policy & Strategy, Deputy Chief of Staff, Operations, Plans and Requirements, Headquarters U.S. Air Force, Washington, D.C.
- September 2012 - June 2013, Air Force Chief of Safety, Headquarters U.S. Air Force, Washington, D.C., and Commander, Air Force Safety Center, Kirtland AFB, N.M.
- June 2013 - mid 2014, Director, Air Force Sexual Assault Prevention and Response Office, Office of the Vice Chief of Staff, Headquarters U.S. Air Force, Washington, D.C. Retired mid 2014.

== Education ==
- 1982: Bachelor of Science degree in aerospace engineering at the Arizona State University, Tempe
- 1995: Air Command and Staff College, Air University at Maxwell Air Force Base
- 1997: Master's degree in aviation science, Embry-Riddle Aeronautical University, Daytona Beach, Fla.
- 2001: Master's degree in national security strategy, National War College in Fort Lesley J. McNair, Washington, D.C.

== Awards and decorations ==
US Air Force Command Pilot Badge
Headquarters Air Force Badge

Air Force Distinguished Service Medal
Defense Superior Service Medal with one bronze oak leaf cluster
Legion of Merit with two oak leaf clusters
Bronze Star Medal
Meritorious Service Medal with two oak leaf clusters
Air Force Commendation Medal
Joint Meritorious Unit Award
Air Force Outstanding Unit Award with silver oak leaf cluster
Combat Readiness Medal
National Defense Service Medal with one bronze service star
Armed Forces Expeditionary Medal
Kosovo Campaign Medal
Global War on Terrorism Expeditionary Medal
Global War on Terrorism Service Medal
Air Force Longevity Service Award with silver and bronze oak leaf clusters
Small Arms Expert Marksmanship Ribbon
Air Force Training Ribbon

== Promotions ==
List of promotions Woodward has received during her career:

Promotions
Major General	2011
Brigadier General	2008
Colonel	2002
Lieutenant Colonel	1998
Major	1994
Captain	1986
First Lieutenant	1984
Second Lieutenant	1982

== See also ==
- List of female United States military generals and flag officers
