= USNS Charles Drew =

Cargo ship of the United States Navy

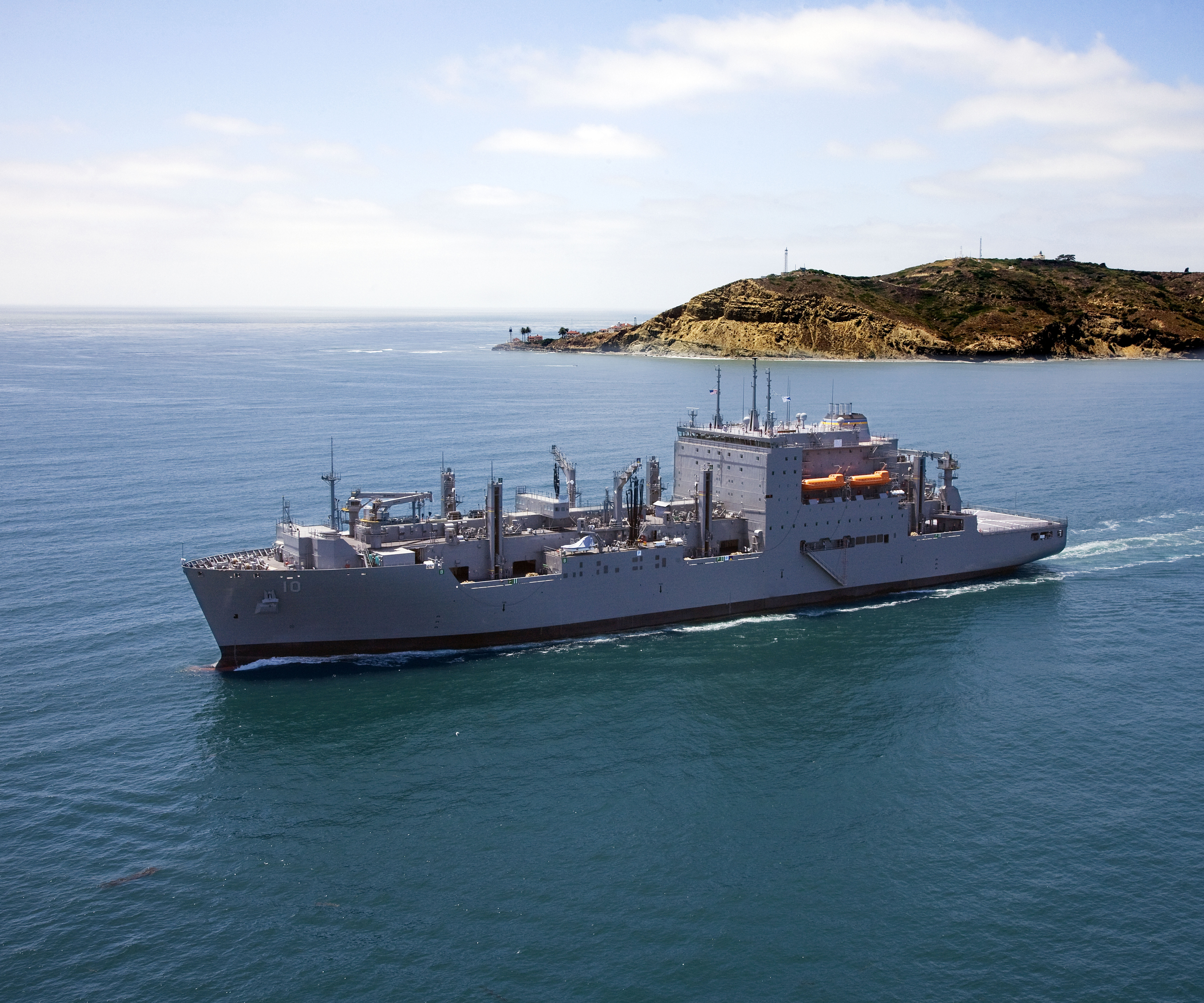
- USNS Charles Drew during 2010

History
- Name: Charles Drew
- Namesake: Charles R. Drew
- Awarded: 31 January 2008
- Builder: National Steel and Shipbuilding Company
- Laid down: 17 March 2009
- Launched: 27 February 2010
- Sponsored by: Mrs. Bebe Drew Price
- Acquired: 14 July 2010
- In service: 2011
- Identification: IMO number: 9508287; MMSI number: 369970428; Callsign: NDRE
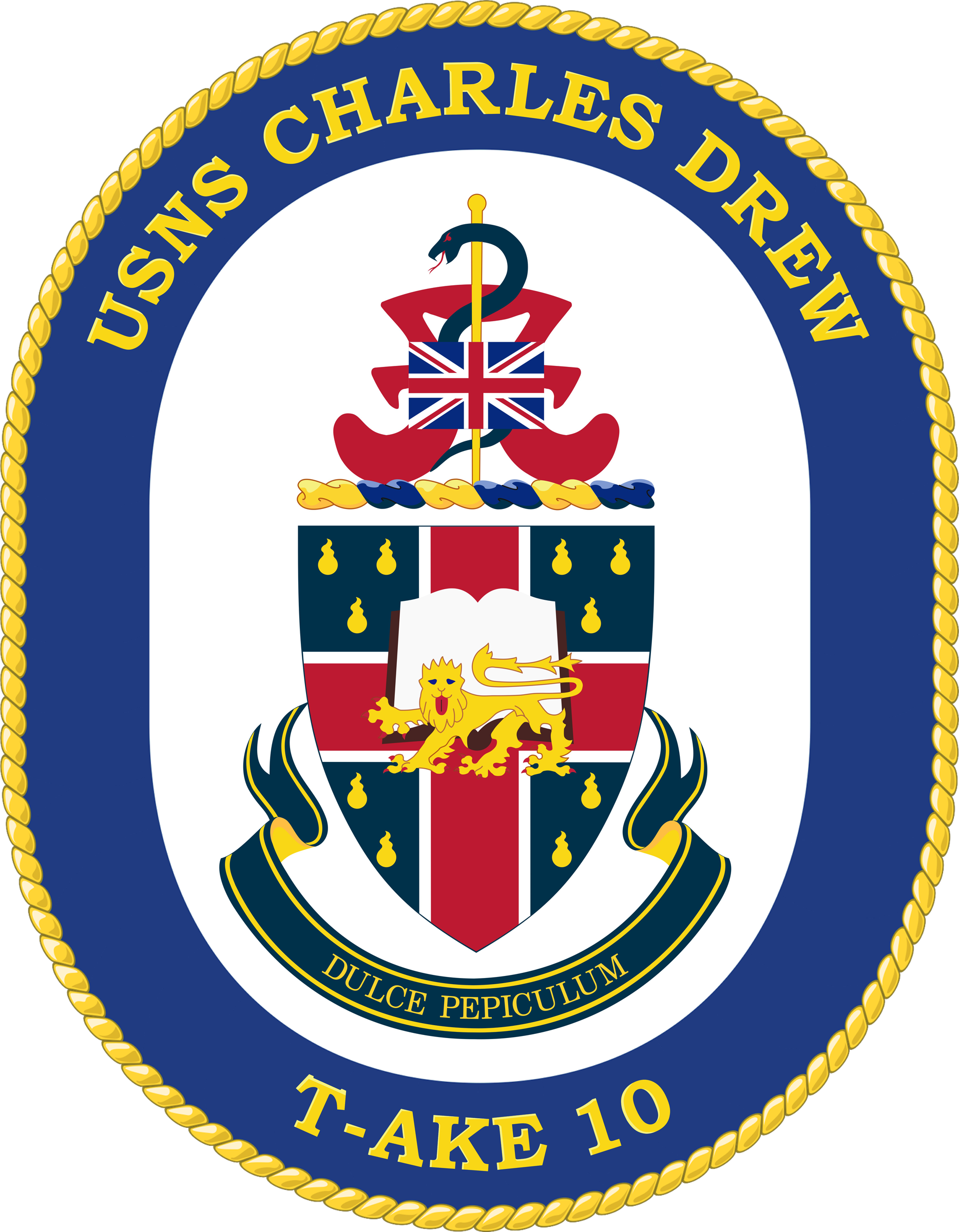
- Badge

General characteristics
- Class & type: Lewis and Clark-class cargo ship
- Displacement: 23,852 tons light, 40,298 tons full, 16,446 tons dead
- Length: 210 m (689 ft) overall, 199.3 m (654 ft) waterline
- Beam: 32.3 m (106 ft) extreme, 32.3 m (106 ft) waterline
- Draft: 9.1 m (30 ft) maximum, 9.4 m (31 ft) limit
- Propulsion: Integrated propulsion and ship service electrical system, with 6.6 kV power provided by two Fairbanks-Morse/MAN B&W 8L48/60 and two 9L48/60 diesel generators; one fixed pitch propeller; bow thruster
- Speed: 20 knots (37 km/h)
- Range: 14,000 nautical miles at 20 kt; (26,000 km at 37 km/h)
- Capacity: Max dry cargo weight: 5,910 long tons (6,000 t); Max dry cargo volume: 783,000 cubic feet (22,200 m^{3}); Max cargo fuel weight: 2,350 long tons (2,390 t); Cargo fuel volume: 18,000 barrels (2,900 m³); (DFM: 10,500) (JP5:7,500)
- Complement: 49 military, 123 civilian
- Electronic warfare & decoys: Nulka decoy launchers
- Armament: 2–6 × 0.5 in (12.7 mm) machine guns; or 7.62 mm medium machine guns
- Aircraft carried: two helicopters, either Sikorsky MH-60S Knighthawk or Aerospatiale Super Puma

USNS Charles Drew (T-AKE-10) is a Lewis and Clark-class dry cargo ship of the United States Navy, named in honor of Dr. Charles R. Drew (1904–1950), who developed improved techniques for blood storage, and applied his expert knowledge in developing large-scale blood banks early in World War II, saving thousands of Allied lives.

The contract to build Charles Drew was awarded to National Steel and Shipbuilding Company (NASSCO) of San Diego, California, on 31 January 2008. Her keel was laid down on 17 March 2009. Charles Drew was christened and launched on 27 February 2010, sponsored by Mrs. Bebe Drew Price, the eldest daughter of Dr. Drew. The principal address at the ceremony was given by Vice Admiral Regina Benjamin, the Surgeon General of the United States.

Charles Drew was delivered to Military Sealift Command on 14 July 2010 and began conducting missions for MSC in spring 2011 and will operate in the Pacific.

On 7 August 2022, the United States Navy sent its first ship, USNS Charles Drew, to Kattupalli Shipyard of Larsen & Toubro for an 11-day repair and allied services work. The repair work was completed on 17 August 2022. This was a result of the U.S.-India 2+2 Ministerial Dialogue in April 2022 where US was represented by Secretary of Defense Lloyd Austin and U.S. Secretary of State Antony Blinken.
