= Lewis and Clark-class dry cargo ship =

US dry cargo and ammunition ship

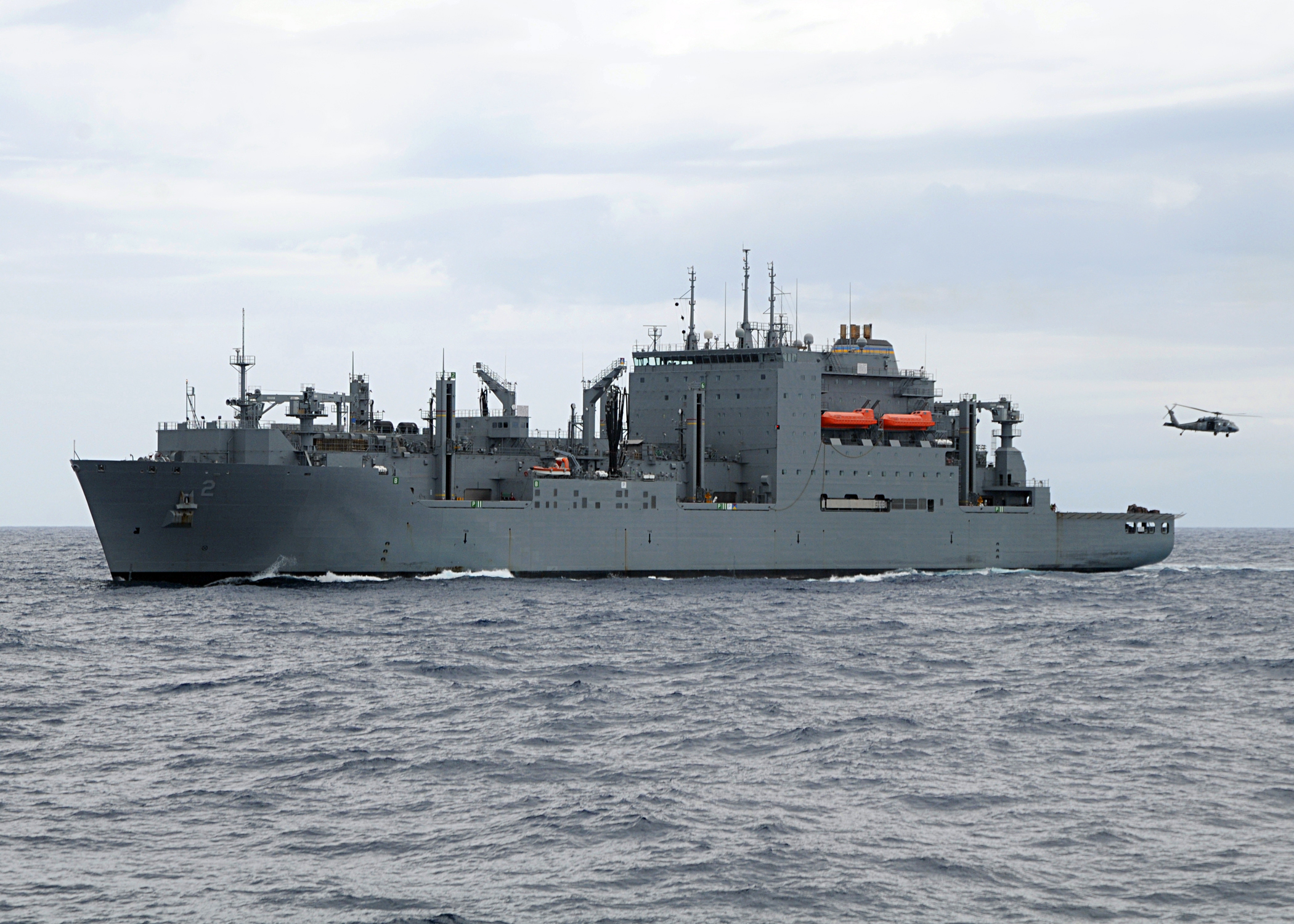
- USNS Sacagawea (T-AKE 2) in 2008

Class overview
- Builders: General Dynamics National Steel and Shipbuilding Company (NASSCO)
- Operators: United States
- Built: 2001–2012
- In service: 2006–present
- Planned: 14
- Completed: 14
- Active: 14
- Retired: 0

General characteristics
- Type: Dry cargo/Ammunition ship
- Displacement: 45,149 tons
- Length: 689 ft 0 in (210 m) overall
- Beam: 106 ft 0 in (32.3 m)
- Draft: 29.9 ft (9.12 m)
- Installed power: Integrated electric propulsion, two Fairbanks-Morse/MAN Diesel 8L48/60A and two 9L48/60A diesel engines; 6.6 kV HV system, generators, motors and drives by GE Power Conversion
- Propulsion: 1 shaft, 2 Tandem propulsion electric motors, 33,000 shp, with fixed pitch propeller; 1 bow thruster
- Speed: 21 knots (39 km/h; 24 mph)
- Capacity: 1,388,000 cubic feet (39,300 m^{3}) of cargo; Fuel cargo: 23,450 barrels
- Complement: 124 civilian mariners; 11 Naval personnel
- Sensors & processing systems: I/J-band surface search radar; I-band navigational radar
- Electronic warfare & decoys: AN/SLQ-25 Nixie torpedo countermeasures
- Armament: Multiple .50 caliber machine guns; Space, weight, and power reservations for close-in weapon systems
- Aviation facilities: Two VREP/support helicopters

The Lewis and Clark class of dry cargo ship is a class of 14 underway replenishment vessels operated by the United States Navy's Military Sealift Command. The ships in the class are named after famous American explorers and pioneers.

== Development ==
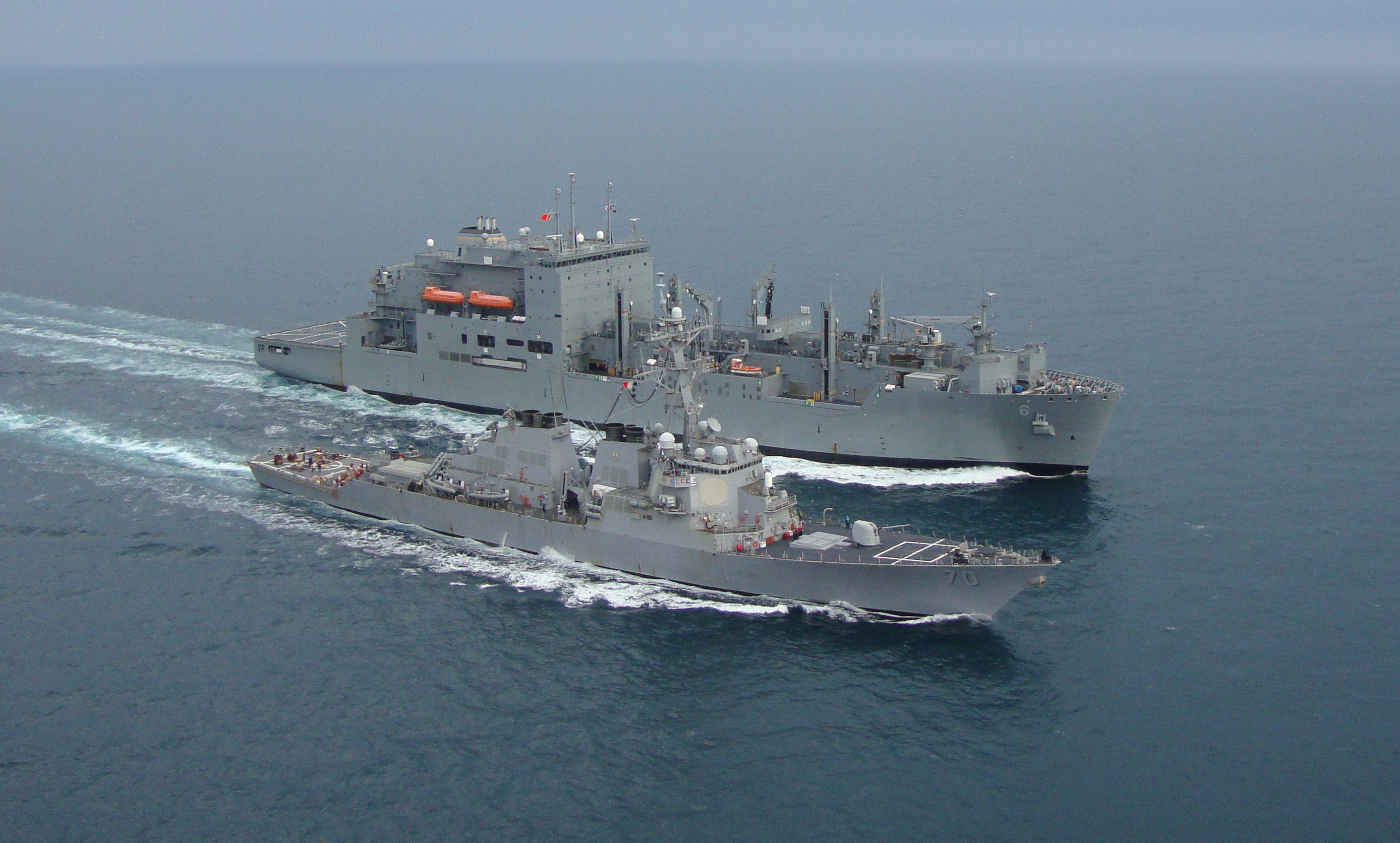
Amelia Earhart conducting underway replenishment with USS Hopper (DDG-70), November 2009

Lewis and Clark-class ships replaced the existing eighteen Mars- and Sirius-class combat store ships and the Kilauea-class ammunition ships. When operating in concert with a Henry J. Kaiser-class replenishment oiler the Lewis and Clarks have replaced the Sacramento-class fast combat support ships. The first of the fourteen ships, USNS Lewis and Clark (T-AKE-1), was placed in service with the Military Sealift Command (MSC) in June 2006. The ships were built to commercial rather than military standards. This was done to minimize costs and to demonstrate the ability to competitively build ships on the civilian market. Though the ships are built to commercial standards they are equipped with various features to increase survivability in a hostile environment, including degaussing, shock hardening in certain equipment, emergency power and communication systems, and increased damage control capability in areas such as firefighting and stability. The ships are equipped with passive defenses to protect against mines and torpedoes and have ABC (atomic, biological, and chemical) countermeasures; the ships also have space and weight reservations for additional self-defense armament. The ships in the class are named after famous American explorers and pioneers. NASSCO was awarded a detailed design and construction contract in October 2001. The fourteenth ship of the class was delivered on 24 October 2012. As the class entered serial production, NASSCO has increased learning and production efficiencies to make substantial reductions in labor hours, from hull to hull. For example, T-AKE-7 was produced with fewer than 50 percent of the worker-hours it took to produce T-AKE-1, and had a 37 percent reduction in total construction time.

== Mission ==
As part of Military Sealift Command's (MSC) Naval Fleet Auxiliary Force (NFAF), the ship's mission is to deliver ammunition, provisions, stores, spare parts, potable water and petroleum products to carrier battle groups and other naval forces, serving as a shuttle ship or station ship. T-AKE-1 and -2 were assigned to one of the two active Maritime Prepositioning Ship squadrons, which are permanently forward deployed to the Western Pacific Ocean and Indian Ocean. While identical in configuration to T-AKE-3 to -14, their mission is to provide selective offload of cargo for resupply and sustainment of U.S. Marine Corps forces ashore. In their primary mission role, the T-AKEs provide logistic lift to deliver cargo (ammunition, food, limited quantities of fuel, repair parts and ship store items) to U.S. and allied ships at sea. In their secondary mission, the T-AKEs may be required to operate in concert with a Henry J. Kaiser-class (T-AO 187) fleet replenishment oiler as a substitute station ship to provide direct logistics support to the ships within a carrier strike group.

== History ==
On 8 February 2008, dry cargo/ammunition ship USNS Lewis and Clark, the first ship in Military Sealift Command's newest class of ships, returned to Naval Station Norfolk, Virginia, after its first deployment.

The ship successfully completed a six-month tour to the U.S. Central Command area of operations to resupply U.S. Navy ships, providing logistics support in the Persian Gulf, around the Horn of Africa, along the length of Somalia and beyond the equator.

USNS Sacagawea (T-AKE-2) got underway for its first deployment 11 December 2008 in the U.S. Navy's 5th Fleet area of operations.

USNS Richard E. Byrd (T-AKE-4) entered the U.S. Navy's 7th Fleet area of operations 24 July 2008, marking the arrival of the first Lewis and Clark-class combat logistics support ship in service to the 52,000,000-square-mile (130,000,000 km^{2}) region.

== Ships ==
Ship	Hull. No.	Launched	In service	Status	NVR Page	MSC Page
Lewis and Clark	T-AKE-1	2005-05-21	2006-06-20	In service		
Sacagawea	T-AKE-2	2006-06-24	2007-02-27	In service		
Alan Shepard	T-AKE-3	2006-12-06	2007-06-26	In service		
Richard E. Byrd	T-AKE-4	2007-05-15	2008-01-08	In service		
Robert E. Peary	T-AKE-5	2007-10-27	2008-06-05	In service		
Amelia Earhart	T-AKE-6	2008-04-06	2008-10-30	In service		
Carl Brashear	T-AKE-7	2008-09-18	2009-03-04	In service		
Wally Schirra	T-AKE-8	2009-03-08	2009-09-01	In service		
Matthew Perry	T-AKE-9	2009-08-16	2010-02-24	In service		
Charles Drew	T-AKE-10	2010-02-27	2010-07-14	In service		
Washington Chambers	T-AKE-11	2010-09-11	2011-02-23	In service		
William McLean	T-AKE-12	2011-04-16	2011-09-29	In service		
Medgar Evers	T-AKE-13	2011-10-29	2012-04-24	In service		
Cesar Chavez	T-AKE-14	2012-05-05	2012-10-24	In service		
