= USS Sacagawea =

USS Sacagawea may refer to the following ships of the United States Navy:

- USS Sacagawea (YT-241), was a tugboat, launched in 1942; acceptance by the Navy was canceled in 1942, but she was retained by the Maritime Commission.
- USS Sacagawea (YT-326), was a tugboat, acquired by the Navy and renamed in 1942, and struck in 1945.
- USNS Sacagawea (T-AKE-2) is a Lewis and Clark-class dry cargo ship, launched in 2006 and in active service
