= USNS Alan Shepard =

Cargo ship of the United States Navy

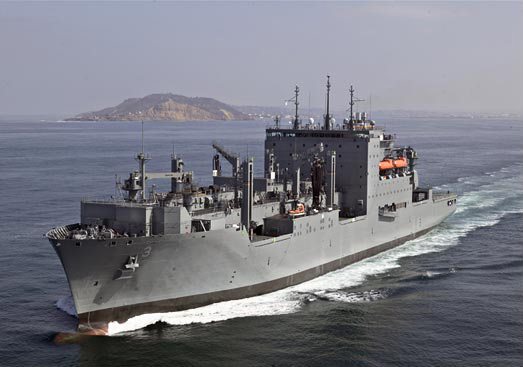
- USNS Alan Shepard sails out of San Diego harbor.

History

United States
- Name: Alan Shepard
- Namesake: Alan Shepard
- Awarded: 16 July 2002
- Builder: National Steel and Shipbuilding
- Laid down: 14 February 2006
- Launched: 6 December 2006
- In service: 26 June 2007
- Identification: IMO number: 9284350; MMSI number: 369498000; Callsign: NSHE
- Status: in active service

General characteristics
- Class & type: Lewis and Clark-class cargo ship
- Displacement: 23,852 tons light, 40,298 tons full, 16,446 tons dead
- Length: 210 m (689 ft) overall, 199.3 m (654 ft) waterline
- Beam: 32.3 m (106 ft) extreme, 32.3 m (106 ft) waterline
- Draft: 9.1 m (30 ft) maximum, 9.4 m (31 ft) limit
- Propulsion: Integrated propulsion and ship service electrical system, with generation at 6.6 kV by FM/MAN B&W diesel generators; one fixed pitch propeller; bow thruster
- Speed: 20 knots (37 km/h)
- Range: 14,000 nautical miles at 20 kt; (26,000 km at 37 km/h)
- Capacity: Max dry cargo weight: 5,910 long tons (6,000 t); Max dry cargo volume: 783,000 cubic feet (22,200 m^{3}); Max cargo fuel weight: 2,350 long tons (2,390 t); Cargo fuel volume: 18,000 barrels (2,900 m³); (DFM: 10,500) (JP5:7,500)
- Complement: 49 military, 123 civilian
- Electronic warfare & decoys: Nulka decoy launchers
- Armament: 2–6 × 0.5 in (12.7 mm) machine guns; or 7.62 mm medium machine guns
- Aircraft carried: two helicopters, either Sikorsky MH-60S Knighthawk or Aerospatiale Puma

USNS Alan Shepard (T-AKE-3) is a Lewis and Clark-class dry cargo ship in the United States Navy. She is named after the astronaut and Rear Admiral, Alan Shepard (1923–1998), the first American in space and the fifth person to walk on the Moon.

== Service history ==
The contract to build her was awarded to National Steel and Shipbuilding Company (NASSCO) of San Diego, on 16 July 2002. Construction began on 13 September 2005. She was launched on 6 December 2006, sponsored by Laura Churchley, daughter of RAdm. Shepard.

Alan Shepard entered active service in 2007. She was initially part of the Pacific Fleet.

During Exercise Pacific Vanguard in August 2022, Alan Shepard launched a BQM-177A target drone during live-fire practice with the guided-missile destroyer USS Barry and the Australian frigate HMAS Perth; this was the first time the drone was used in a training exercise. Both vessels launched missiles at the BWM-177A and successfully intercepted it.

By 2023, Alan Shepard was assigned to the United States Fifth Fleet. In July 2023, Alan Shepard entered a shipyard in Al Hidd, Bahrain, and on 15 July, while leaving the shipyard, she ran aground. None of the approximately 85 individuals on the ship were injured in the accident. The next day, tugboats refloated Alan Shepard. An inspection after the accident revealed that Alan Shepard was not significantly damaged.
