= USNS Robert E. Peary =

Cargo ship of the United States Navy

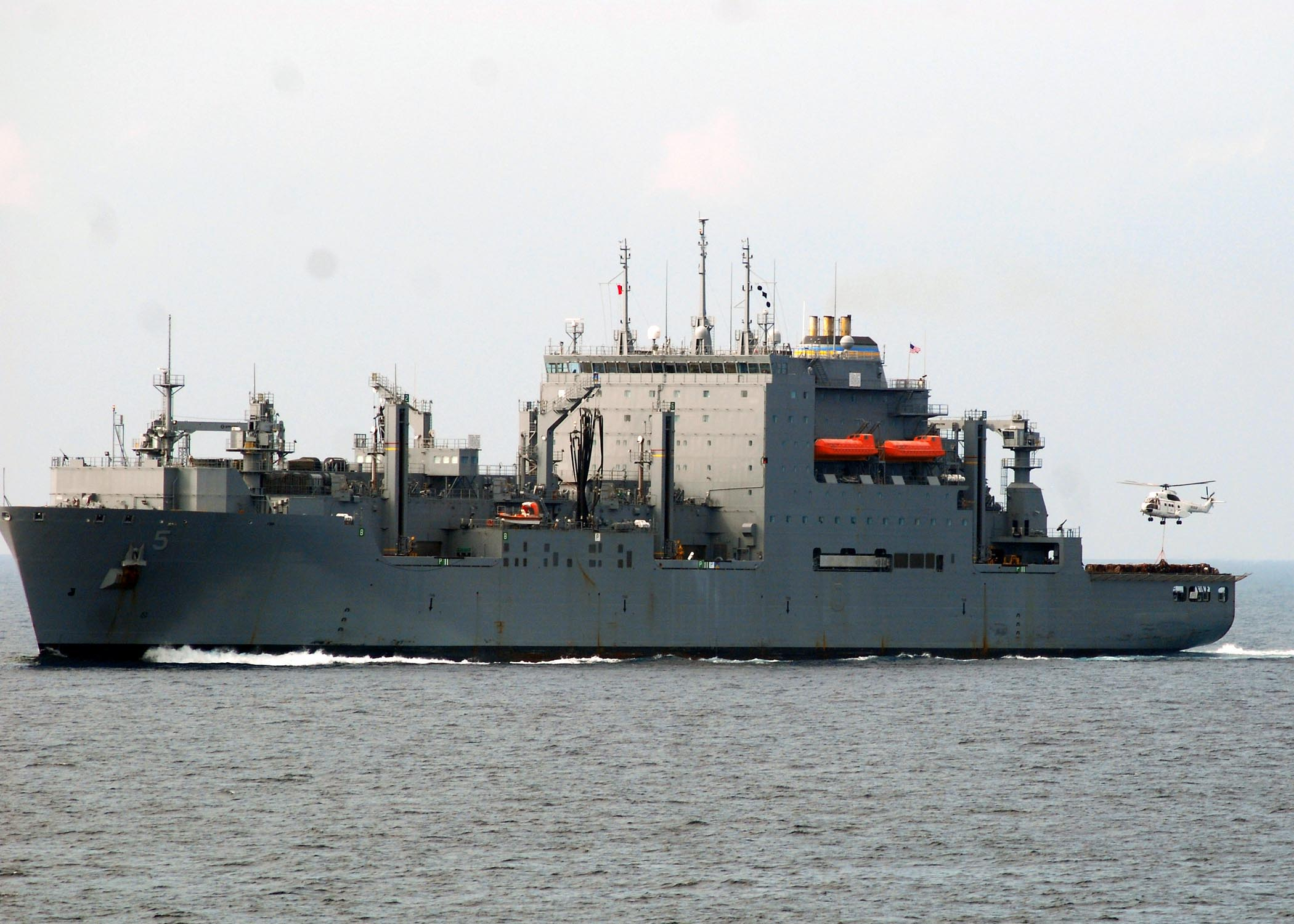
- USNS Robert E. Peary

History
- Name: Robert E. Peary
- Namesake: Robert Peary
- Awarded: 27 January 2004
- Builder: National Steel and Shipbuilding
- Laid down: 12 December 2006
- Launched: 27 October 2007
- Christened: 9 February 2008
- In service: 5 June 2008
- Identification: IMO number: 9319806; MMSI number: 369886000; Callsign: NPEA
- Motto: "King of the Team"
- Status: in active service
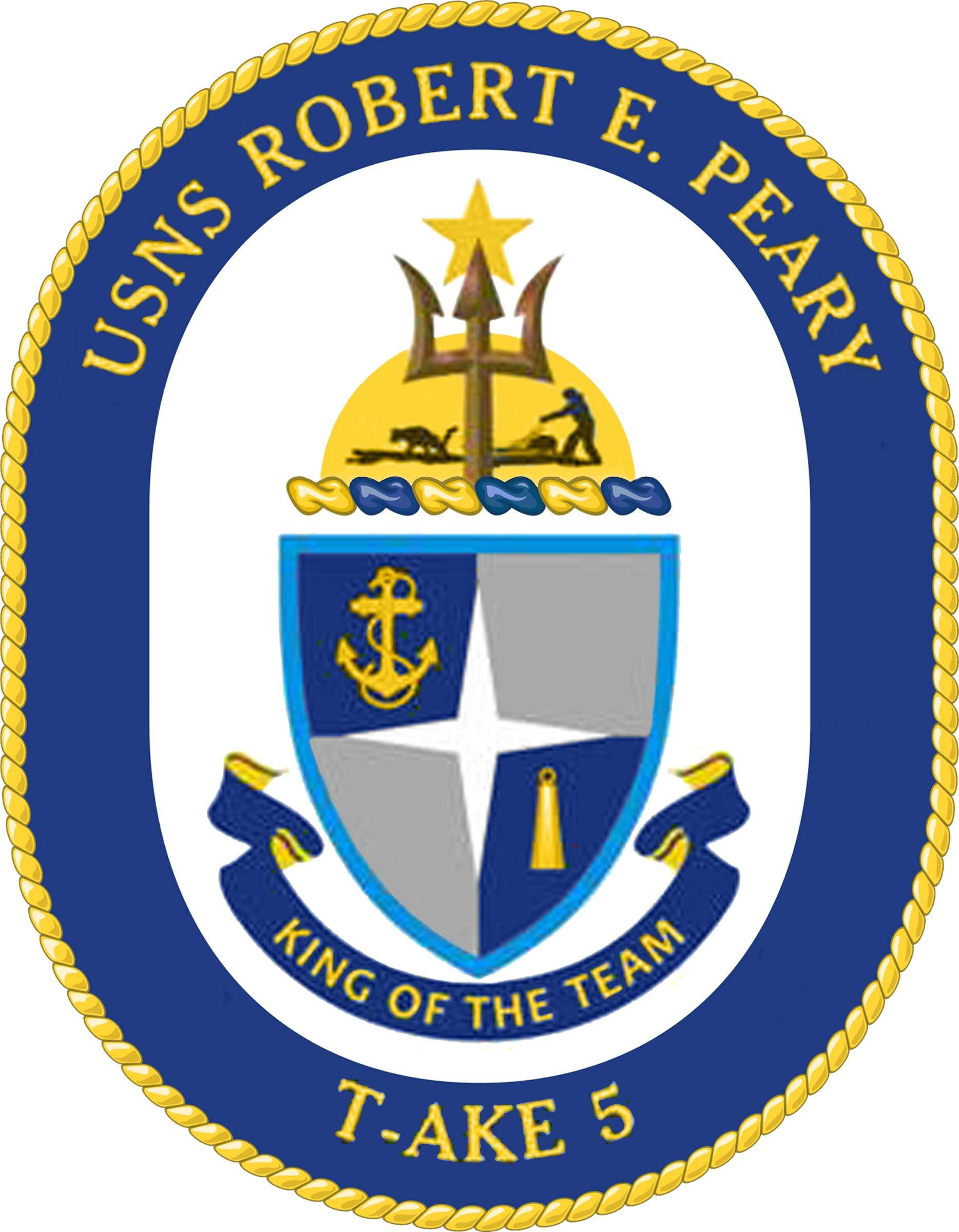
- Badge

General characteristics
- Class & type: Lewis and Clark-class cargo ship
- Displacement: 23,852 tons light, 40,298 tons full, 16,446 tons dead
- Length: 210 m (689 ft) overall, 199.3 m (654 ft) waterline
- Beam: 32.3 m (106 ft) extreme, 32.3 m (106 ft) waterline
- Draft: 9.1 m (30 ft) maximum, 9.4 m (31 ft) limit
- Propulsion: Integrated propulsion and ship service electrical system, with generation at 6.6 kV by FM/MAN B&W diesel generators; one fixed pitch propeller; bow thruster
- Speed: 20 knots (37 km/h)
- Range: 14,000 nautical miles at 20 kt; (26,000 km at 37 km/h)
- Capacity: Max dry cargo weight: 5,910 long tons (6,000 t); Max dry cargo volume: 783,000 cubic feet (22,200 m^{3}); Max cargo fuel weight: 2,350 long tons (2,390 t); Cargo fuel volume: 18,000 barrels (2,900 m³); (DFM: 10,500) (JP5:7,500)
- Complement: 49 military, 123 civilian
- Electronic warfare & decoys: Nulka decoy launchers
- Armament: 2–6 × 0.5 in (12.7 mm) machine guns; or 7.62 mm medium machine guns
- Aircraft carried: two helicopters, MH-60S Knighthawk

USNS Robert E. Peary (T-AKE-5) is a Lewis and Clark-class dry cargo ship in the United States Navy. She is the fourth Navy ship named for Arctic explorer, Rear Admiral Robert E. Peary (1856–1920).

== Construction ==
The contract to build Robert E. Peary was awarded to National Steel and Shipbuilding Company (NASSCO) of San Diego, California, on 27 January 2004. Her keel was laid down on 12 December 2006 and she was launched on schedule on 27 October 2007. However, the planned christening ceremony had to be delayed because of the local disruption caused by the October 2007 California wildfires.

Robert E. Peary was christened on 9 February 2008, sponsored by Peary's great-granddaughter Peary S. Fowler, a judge in Monroe County, Florida.

== Operational history ==
On 10 March 2017, Robert E. Peary berthed in HM Naval Base Portsmouth to test the newly built facilities for the Queen Elizabeth Class aircraft carriers.

== In popular culture ==
The ship was featured in the Discovery Channel's Mighty Ships.

== Gallery ==
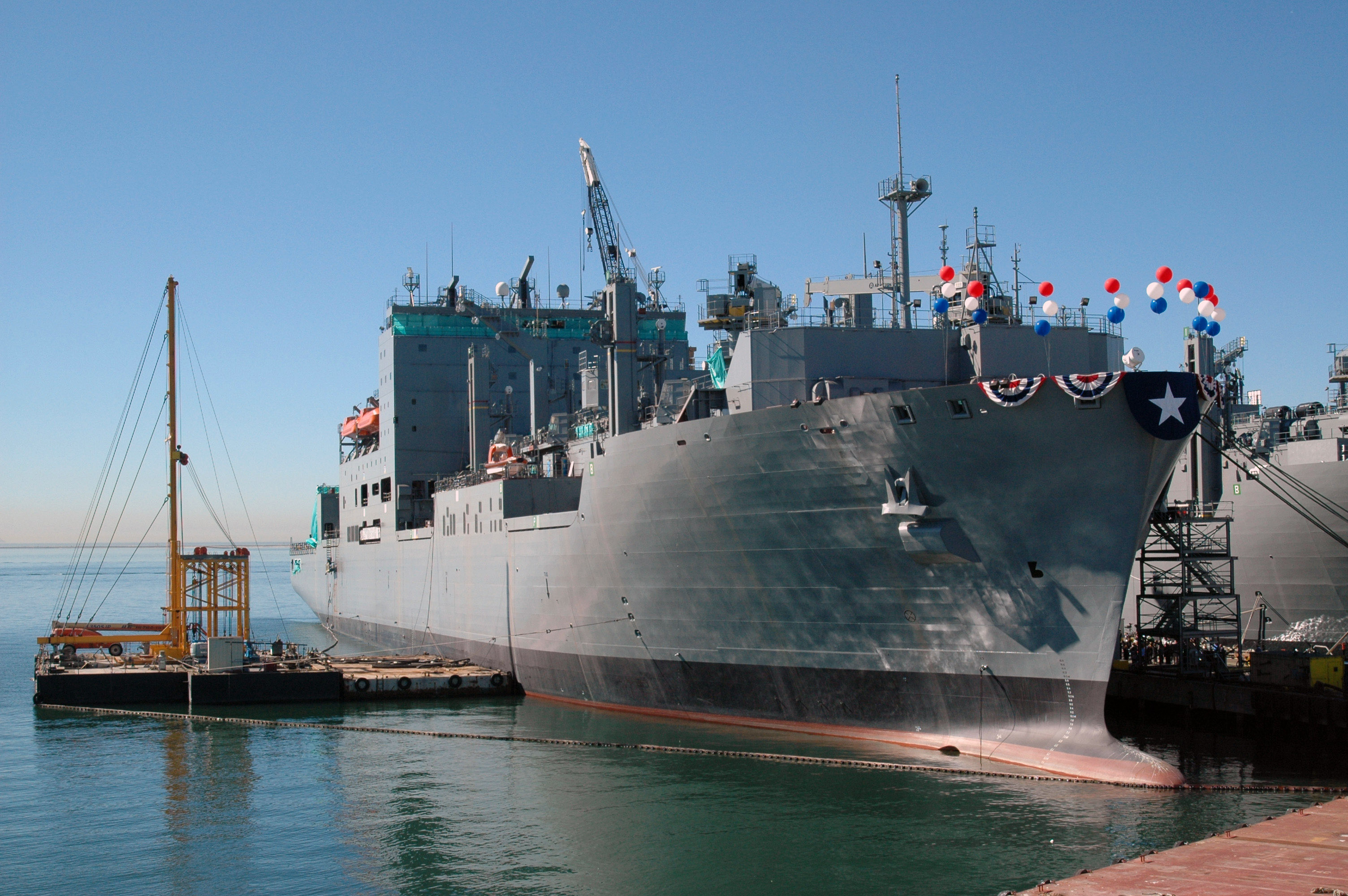
USNS Robert E. Peary (T-AKE-5) during christening ceremonies at General Dynamics NASSCO shipyard, 9 February 2008

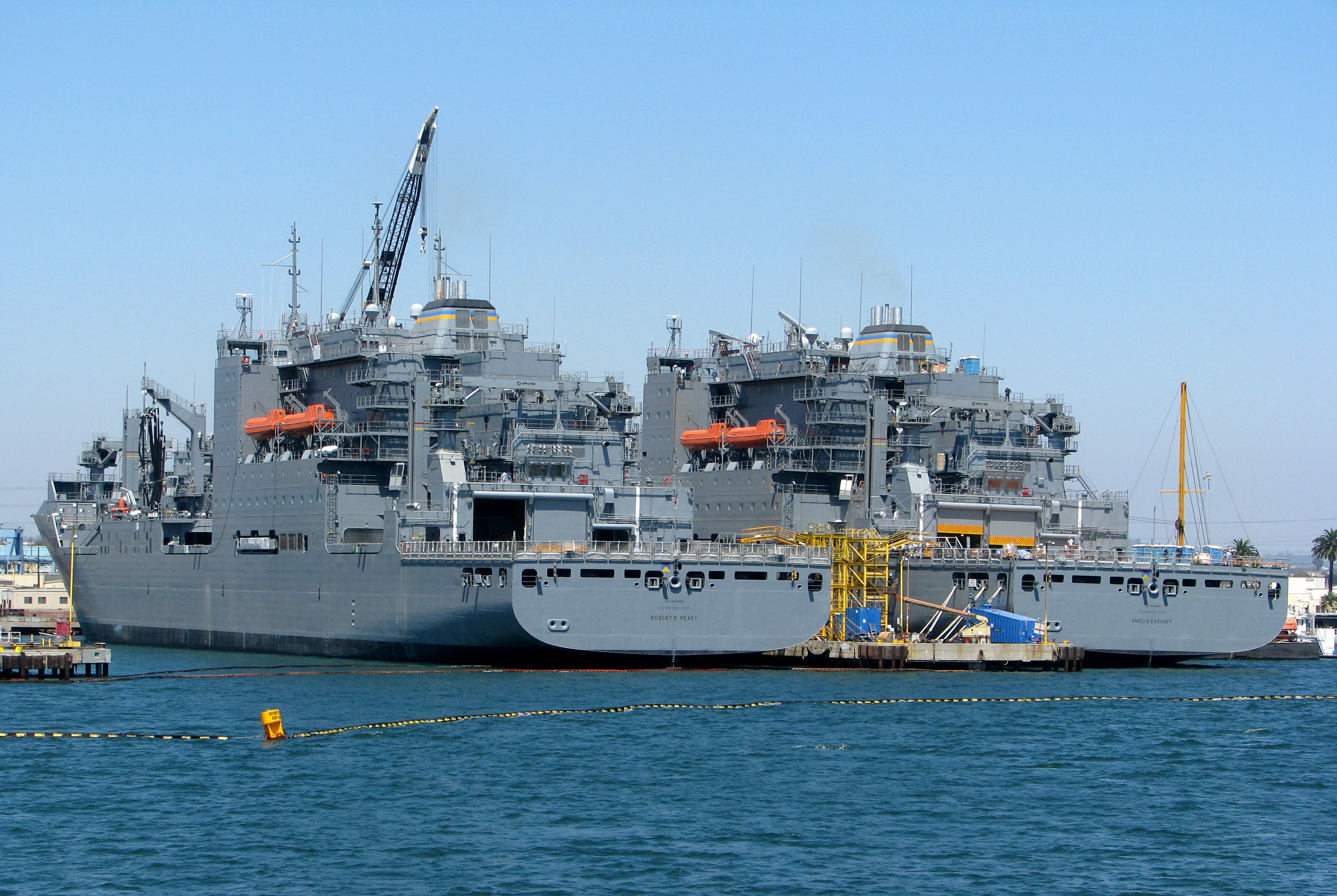
USNS Robert E. Peary (T-AKE-5) still being built.
