= Exercise Freedom Banner =

Annual U.S. Marine Corps exercise

Exercise Freedom Banner is an annual 3rd Marine Expeditionary Force United States Marine Corps exercise that is performed with rotating partner countries throughout the Pacific Rim.

== 2006 Exercises ==
Source: USMC

400 Marines and sailors with 3rd Materiel Readiness Battalion's 3rd Marine Logistics Group performed exercises including tactical vehicles and equipment off-loading on March 4 at Mokpo Newport, Korea. This exercise was conducted from March 7 to April 14 and involved the movement of Maritime Propositioning Force shipping and associated combat forces into the Korean theater of operations in support of two separate exercises.
