= Edison Chouest Offshore =

Shipyard companies

- Industry: Shipping, Shipbuilding, Offshore support, Port Operations, Subsea Services-ROV
- Founded: 1960
- Headquarters: Cut Off, Louisiana, USA
- Area served: Gulf of Mexico; Brazil; South America
- Key people: Edison Chouest
- Products: Ships, tugs, platform supply vessels, ice breakers
- Subsidiaries: North American Shipbuilding; Tampa Ship; Gulf Ship LLC; La Ship; Estaleiro NavShip
- Website: chouest.com

Edison Chouest Offshore (ECO), which started as Edison Chouest Boat Rentals in 1960, is a family of companies in the marine transportation business based in Cut Off, Louisiana. ECO owns and operates a fleet of platform supply vessels, Subsea Construction / IMR vessels, a Riserless Light Well Intervention vessel, Anchor handling tug supply vessels, Oil Spill Response Vessels, and Well Stimulation Vessels, as well as an independently owned fleet of Research Vessels and Ice Breakers.

Edison Chouest Offshore operates five shipyards:

- North American Shipbuilding (NAS) in Larose, Louisiana was founded in 1974 on the Dixie Delta Canal running to Lake Salvador. 29.585°N 90.375°W
- Gulf Ship LLC, in Gulfport, Mississippi, in 2007 30.427°N 89.0455°W
- Tampa Ship, the former Tampa Bay Shipbuilding, founded in 2008. 27.926°N 82.444°W
- La Ship, in Houma, Louisiana, founded in 2011 29.547°N 90.7019°W
  - North American Fabricators, (NAF), in Houma, Louisiana, founded in 1996 (now part of LaShip) 29.5699°N 90.700°W
- Estaleiro NavShip, in Navegantes, Brazil at Superporto do Açu on the Itajaí-Açu river founded in 2005 26.878°S 48.689°W
- ECO's offshore vessels range from 109 feet to 525 feet.
- Edison Chouest Offshore has an office in Houston Texas and has a fleet of over 200 vessels some with Remotely operated underwater vehicles (ROV-subsea).
- Edison Chouest operates the Edison Chouest Offshore Training Center.

Port services

- Port Fourchon C-Port and C-Logistics, loading and unloading, dockside services.
  - C-Innovation, riserless light well intervention (RLWI) services.
  - Martin Terminal large staging lot.
  - C-Terminal, Port Fourchon Dock and warehouse storage.
  - Fourchon Heavy Lift, 500-ton derrick crane
  - Clean Tank service and clean Waste service
- Port of Açu, located in São João da Barra in northern Rio de Janeiro-RJ, Brazil.

Photo gallery

- Some ships built by North American Shipbuilding - Edison Chouest Offshore:
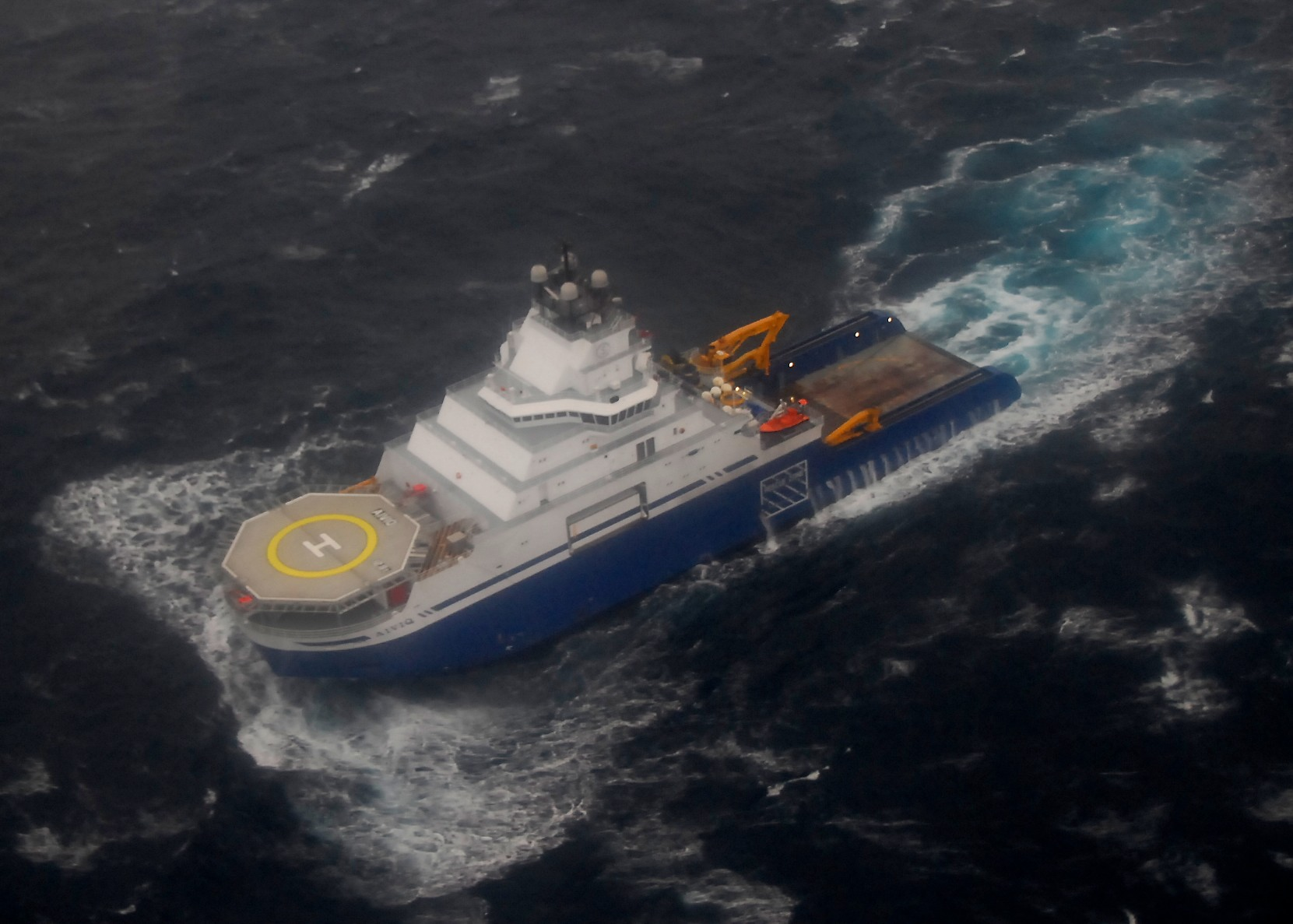
Aiviq in heavy seas on 30 December 2012.

MV Cory Chouest

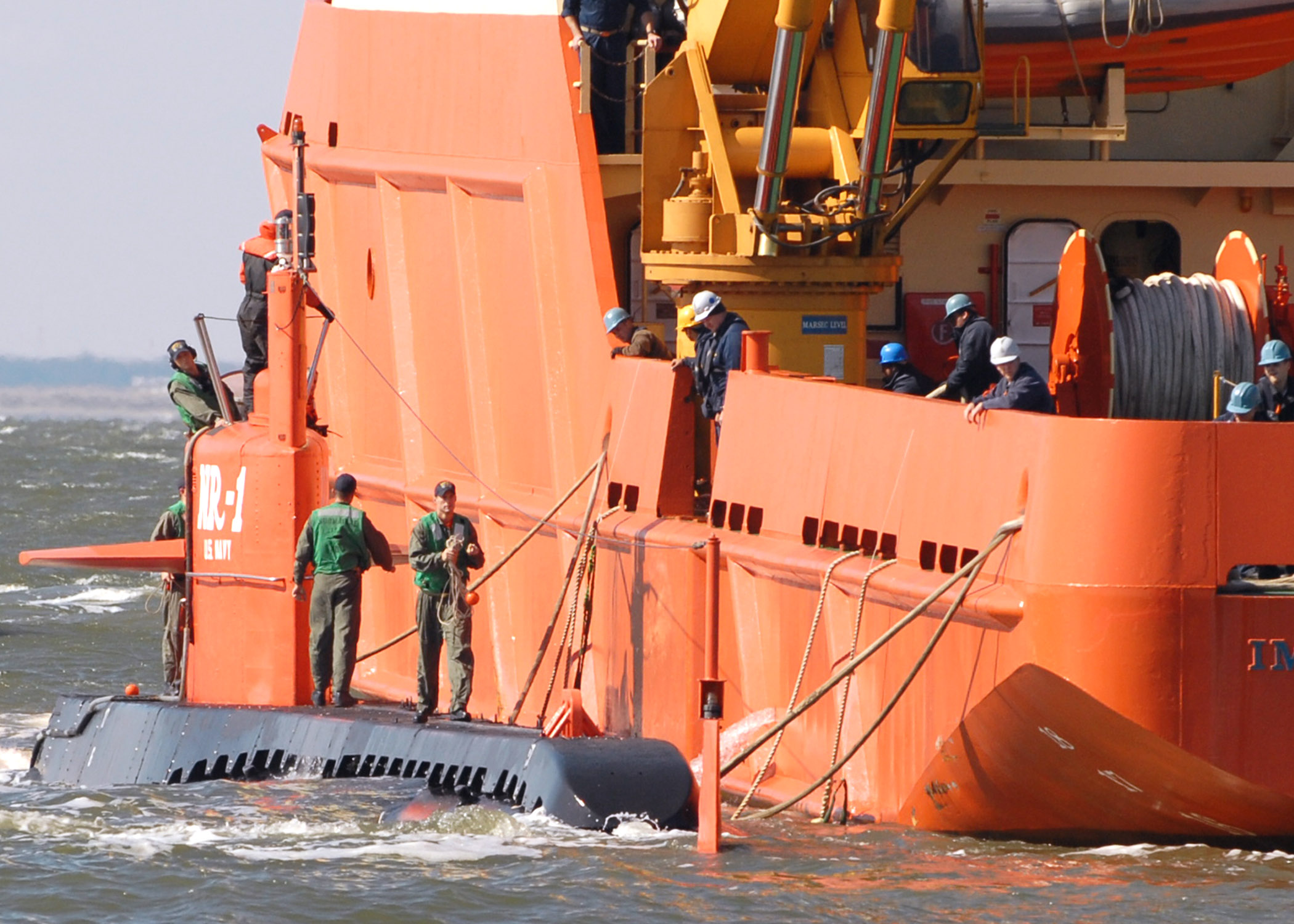
MV Carolyn Chouest with NR-1.

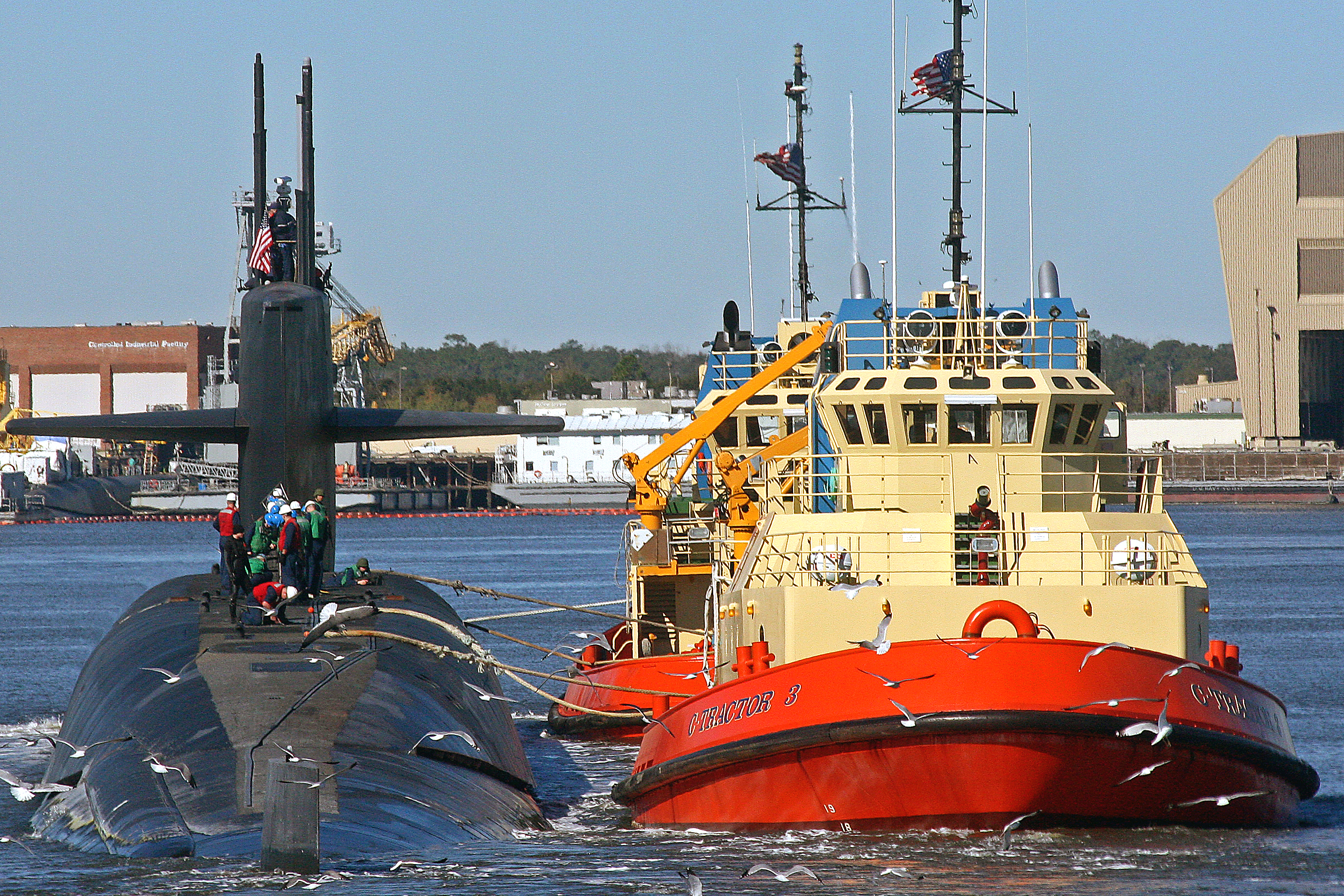
The C-Tractor 3, escorts the U.S. Navy ballistic-missile submarine USS Rhode Island (SSBN-740).

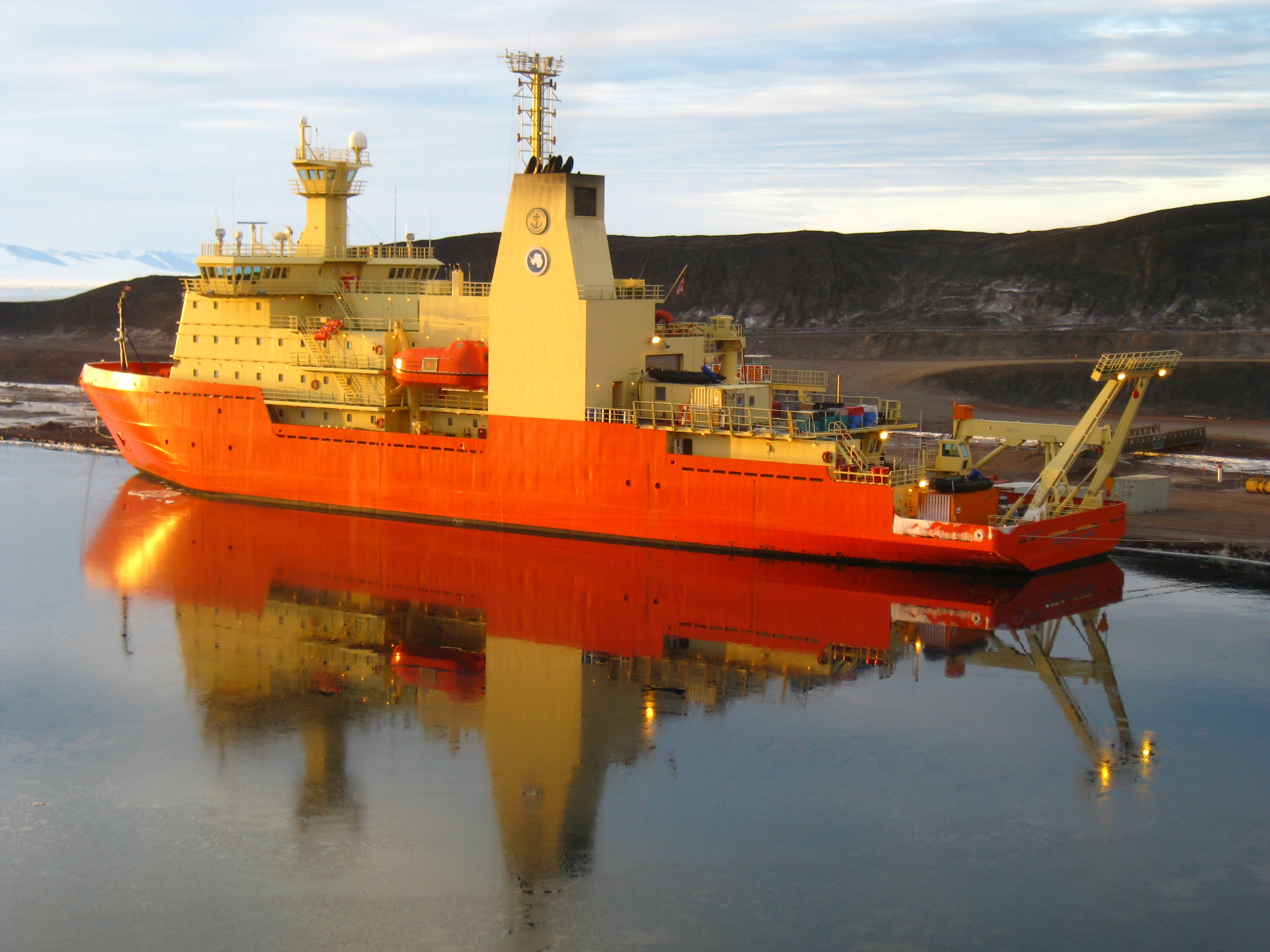
Icebreaker Nathaniel B. Palmer, serving the National Science Foundation.

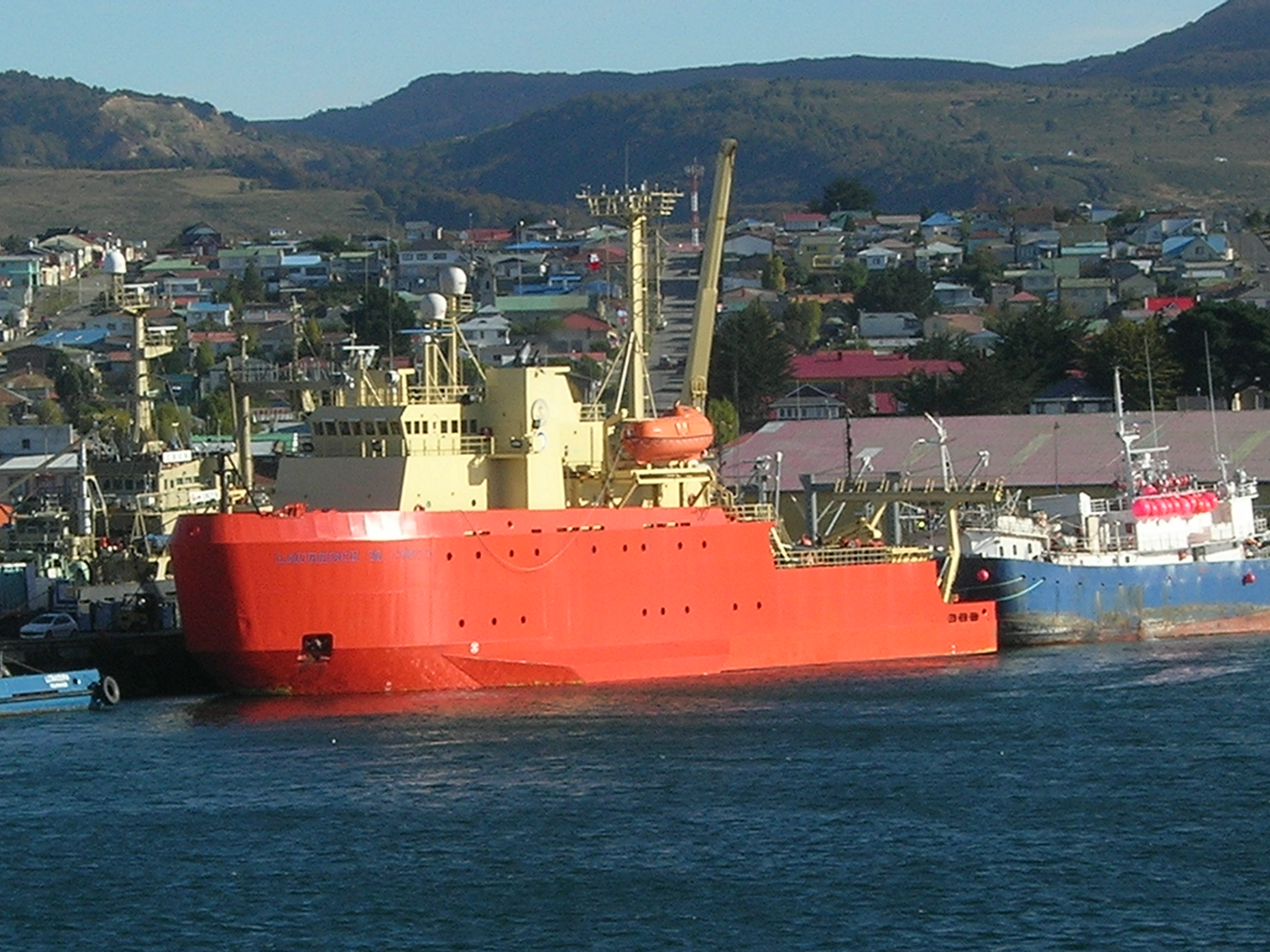
RV Laurence M. Gould in Punta Arenas, Chile.

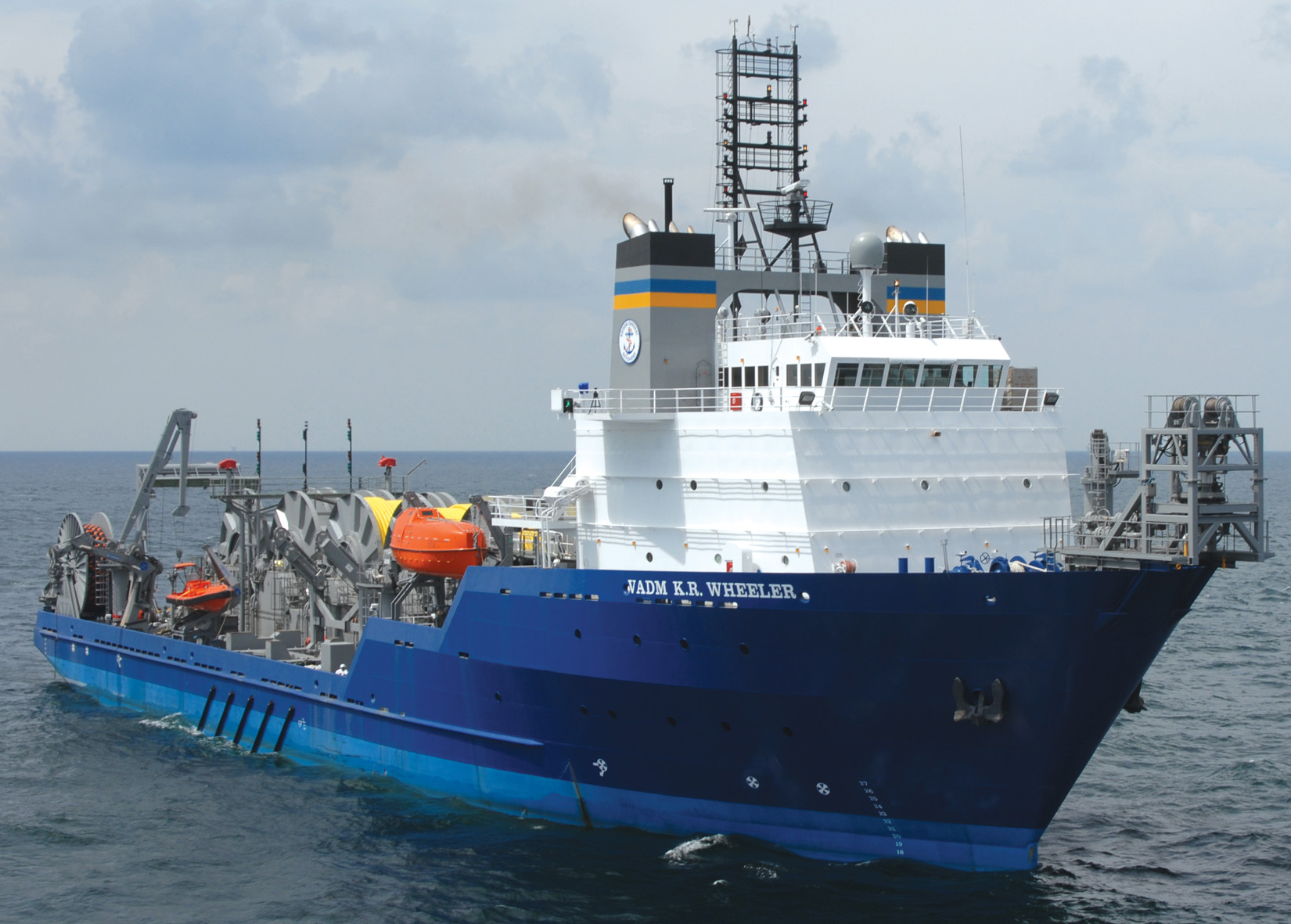
USNS VADM K. R. Wheeler
