= USCGC Storis =

USCGC Storis is the name of the following vessels of the United States Coast Guard:

- USCGC Storis (WMEC-38), a light icebreaker in service 1942–2007
- USCGC Storis (WAGB-21), a medium icebreaker commissioned in 2025
