= MV Carolyn Chouest =

US flagged chartered support ship for the US Navy

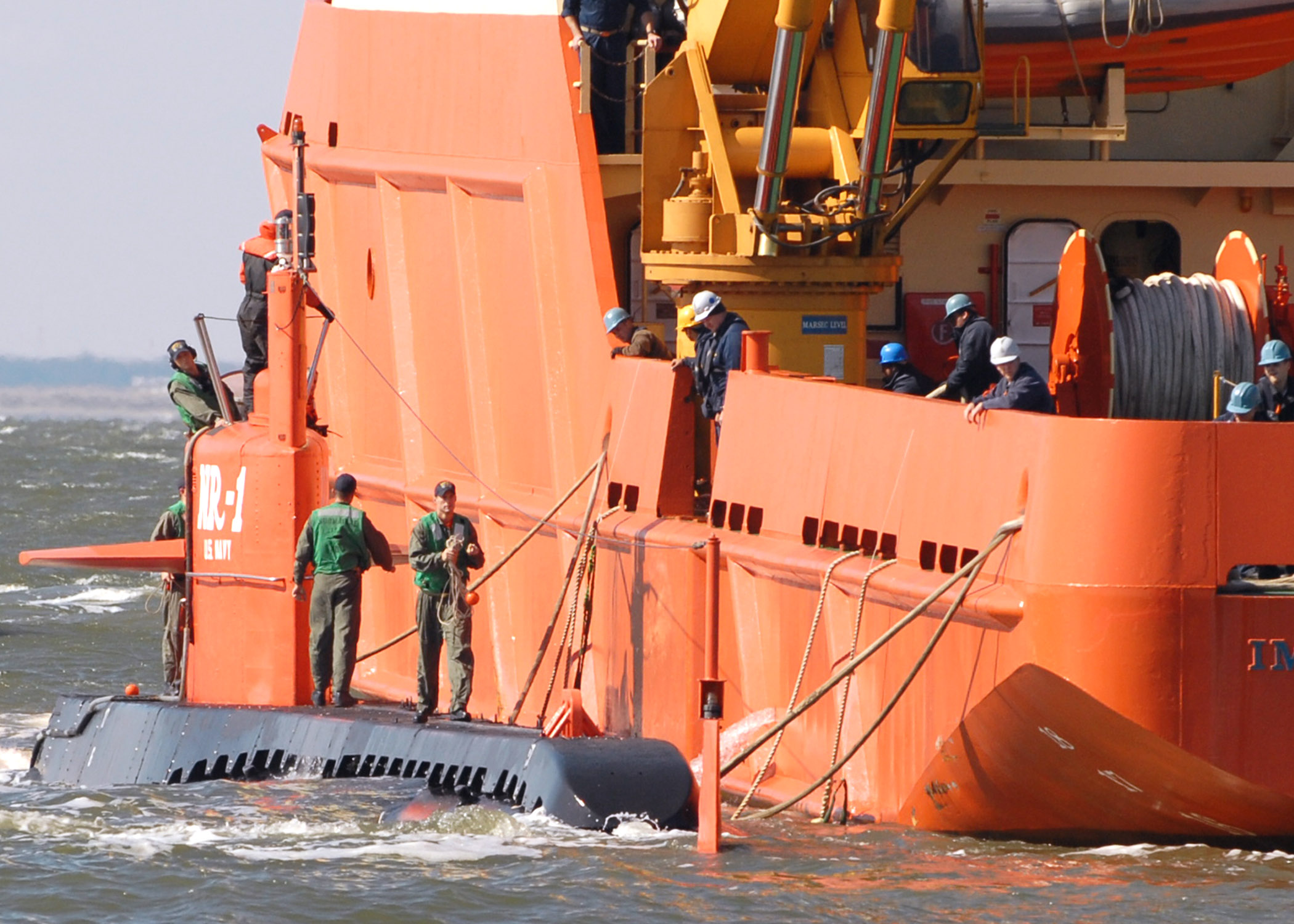
- MV Carolyn Chouest with NR-1.

History

United States
- Name: Carolyn Chouest
- Owner: Edison Chouest Offshore
- Builder: North American Shipbuilding Co., Larose, LA
- Acquired: June 1994
- In service: 1994
- Identification: IMO number: 8875384; MMSI number: 366404000; Callsign: WCP5628
- Status: Currently in service
- Notes: Leased to the Military Sealift Command (MSC), contractor operated and controlled

General characteristics
- Type: Ocean surveillance ship
- Displacement: 1599 tons
- Length: 238 ft (73 m)
- Beam: 52 ft (16 m)
- Draft: 17 ft (5.2 m)
- Installed power: 2 × 12-cylinder Caterpillar diesel engines 10,800 hp (8,100 kW)
- Propulsion: Two Kort Nozzle variable-pitch propellers
- Speed: 17 knots (31 km/h; 20 mph)

MV Carolyn Chouest is a chartered support ship for the United States Navy that was originally assigned to the Special Missions Program to support NR-1, the deep submergence craft. She towed NR-1 between work areas, served as a floating supply warehouse and provided quarters for extra crew until the NR-1 was removed from service in 2008.

Since the 2010s the ship has been used to support American special forces units in the Pacific region.

== Operational history ==
In 1995, Dr. Robert Ballard used the Carolyn Chouest and its sub the NR-1, to explore the wreck of HMHS Britannic, the sister ship of RMS Titanic, which sank off the coast of Kea, Greece while serving as a hospital ship during World War I.

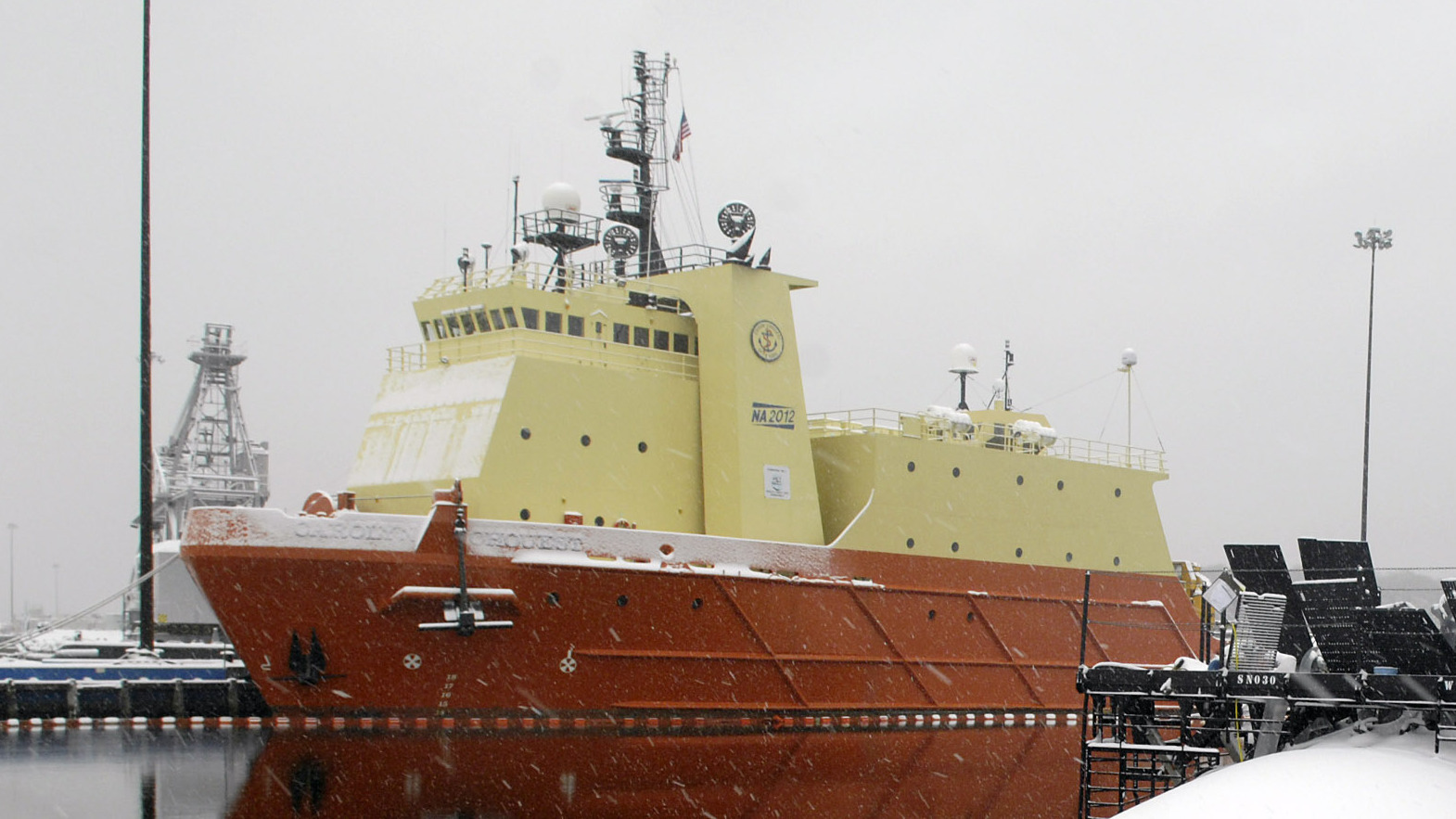
MV Carolyn Chouest in 2008

November 1999, Carolyn Chouest assisted recovery efforts after the EgyptAir Flight 990 airplane crash 60 miles (97 km) south of Nantucket, Massachusetts. She provided underwater mapping of the debris field using the side-scan sonar and recorded underwater video of the site with the ROV Magnum.

February 2002, NR-1 and Carolyn Chouest helped archeologists to chart the USS Monitor, the Navy's first ironclad warship, as she rests 250 feet (76 m) below the sea.

October 2004, Carolyn Chouest helped tow HMCS Chicoutimi back to Faslane, after a fire on board the Canadian submarine killed one crewman and injured two, 100 miles (160 km) off Ireland.

December 2006, the fast-attack submarine, USS Pittsburgh resurfaced during sea trials after a 25-year-old Portsmouth Naval Shipyard employee began having neurological problems. He was safely transferred to Carolyn Chouest and continued to receive treatment from Pittsburgh's corpsman until evacuated by a Coast Guard helicopter.

March 2007, NR-1 and Carolyn Chouest under the direction of oceanographer Robert Ballard began mapping the Flower Garden Banks National Marine Sanctuary to help scientists determine where early Americans might have lived when, at the height of the last ice age, sea levels were nearly 400 feet (120 m) lower than they are today.

In March 3, 2023 Carolyn Chouest joined the North Pacific Arctic Conference off Guam.
