= C-Tractor =

Tugboat

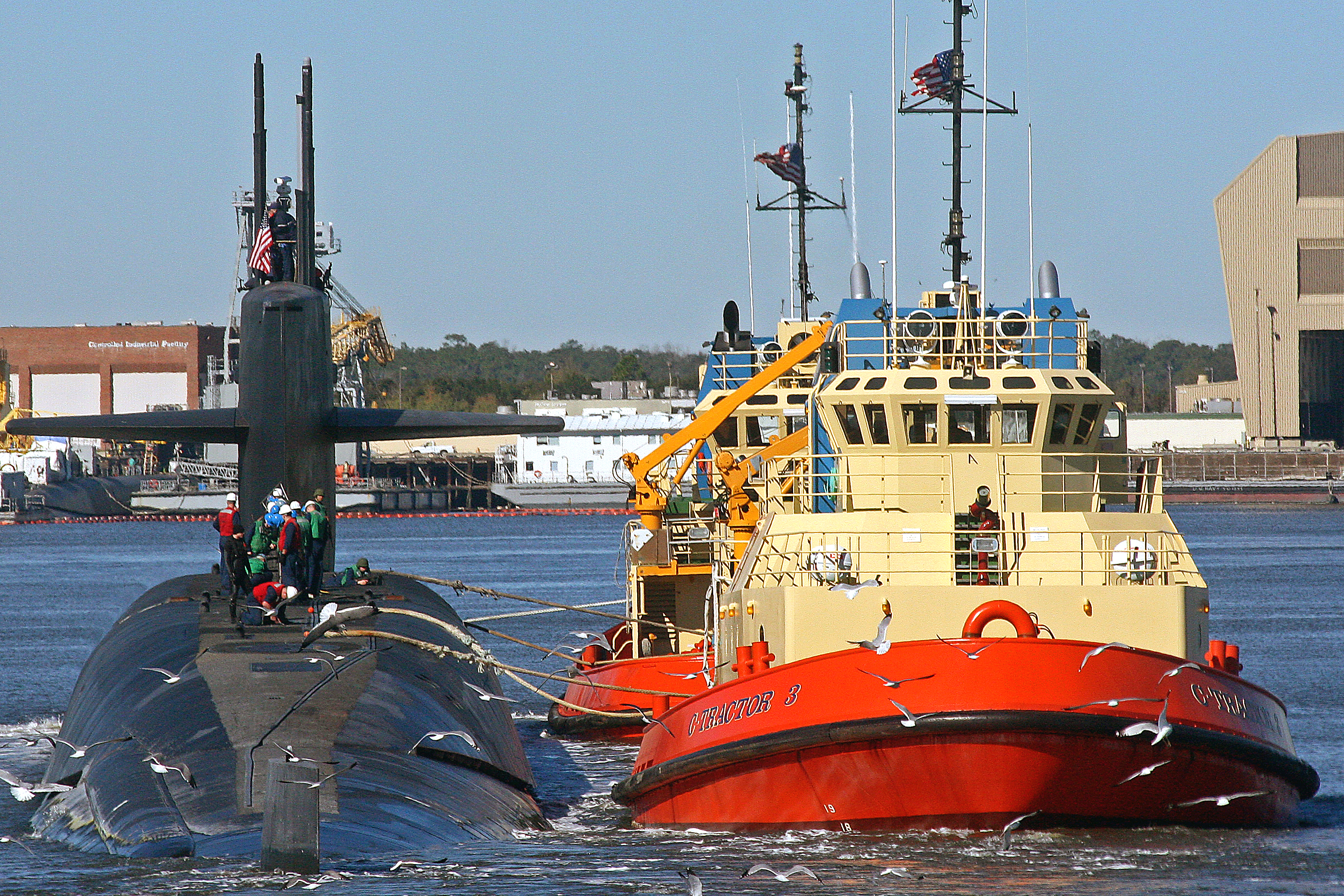
- C-Tractor 3 escorts the U.S. Navy ballistic-missile submarine USS Rhode Island (SSBN-740).

Class overview
- Builders: North American Shipbuilding Company
- Operators: Bay-Houston Towing Company
- Built: 1989–1993
- In service: 1989–present
- Completed: 14
- Active: 14

General characteristics
- Type: Z-drive tug
- Tonnage: 189 GT
- Length: 109 ft (33 m)
- Beam: 37 ft (11 m)
- Draft: 17 ft (5.2 m)
- Installed power: 4,000 shp (3,000 kW)
- Propulsion: Z-drive
- Speed: 12 knots (22 km/h; 14 mph)
- Bollard pull: 110,000 lb (50,000 kg)
- Water cannons: fore and aft, 3,500 US gal/min (790 m^{3}/h)

C-Tractor is a class of fourteen tractor tugs built by North American Shipbuilding Company between 1989 and 1993 for Alpha Marine Services, a subsidiary of Edison Chouest Offshore. The lead ship of the class was William M , also known as C-Tractor 1

C-Tractors measure 189 GT. They are propelled by Z-drive pods, powered by twin EMD 16-645 engines rated at 4,000 shaft horsepower (3,000 kW). The tugs mount fore and aft fire-fighting monitors, capable of pumping a total of 3,500 US gallons per minute (790 m^{3}/h).

In 2005, C-Tractor 1 was sold to Bay-Houston Towing Company and based in Corpus Christi, Texas. Her sister ships continue to be owned by Alpha Marine; six – C-Tractor 2, C-Tractor 3, C-Tractor 4, C-Tractor 5, C-Tractor 12, C-Tractor 13 – were at one point chartered to the United States Navy.

== C-Tractor 1 ==
History
- Name: C-Tractor 1 (1989–); William M (–)
- Owner: Alpha Marine Services (1989–2005); Bay-Houston Towing Company (2005–)
- Builder: North American Shipbuilding Company
- Yard number: 133
- Launched: 1989
- Identification: IMO number: 8835140; MMSI number: 367019240; Callsign: WDC4110
- Status: Active

C-Tractor 1 (William M) was built in 1989. In 2005 it was sold to Bay-Houston Towing Company and based in Corpus Christi, Texas.
