= Superporto do Açu =

Port in São João da Barra, Rio de Janeiro, Brazil

Coordinates: 21.8208672°S 41.0198593°W

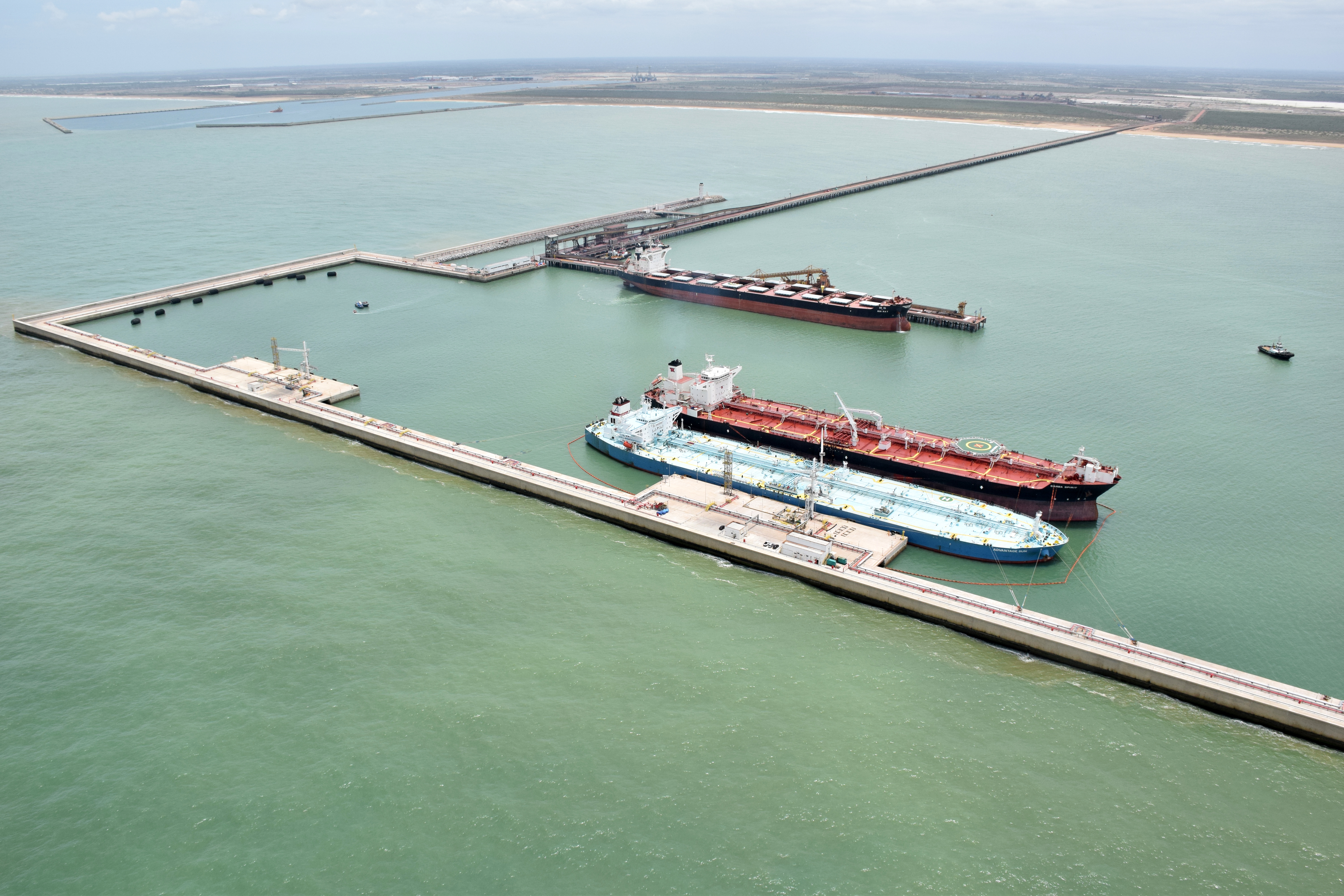
Port of Açu

Superporto do Açu is a South Atlantic Ocean industrial port complex located in the municipality of São João da Barra in the Brazilian state of Rio de Janeiro.

Its location is strategic for the oil industry, as it is close to the deposits of the Campos dos Goytacazes and Espírito Santo basins. It was the only fully private port in Brazil in 2023. The industrial port project started operating in 2014, having in 2023 the third largest private iron ore terminal in Brazil, where it is responsible for 30% of the country's oil exports. In addition, in 2023, it was building the largest thermoelectric park in Latin America, and it houses the largest offshore support base in the world.

== See also ==
- Estaleiro NavShip of Edison Chouest Offshore
