= American submarine NR-1 =

Experimental nuclear submarine

NR-1
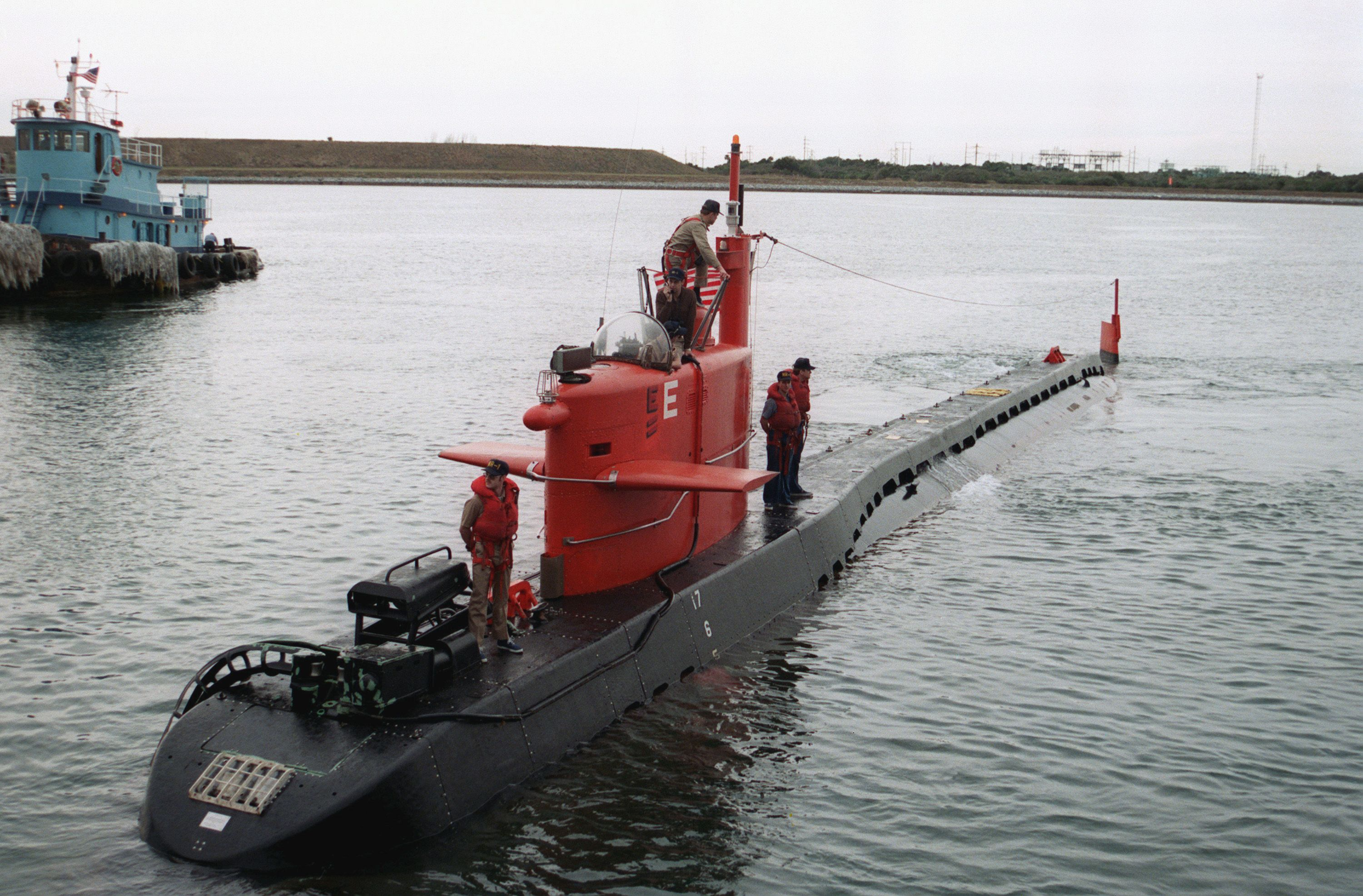
- Deep submergence vessel NR-1

History

United States
- Name: NR-1
- Builder: General Dynamics Electric Boat
- Laid down: 10 June 1967
- Launched: 25 January 1969
- In service: 27 October 1969
- Out of service: 21 November 2008
- Motto: The World's Finest Deep Submersible
- Nickname(s): Nerwin
- Fate: Scrapped

General characteristics
- Class & type: Unique submarine
- Displacement: 400 tons
- Length: 45 m (147 ft 8 in) overall; 29.3 m (96 ft 2 in) pressure hull
- Beam: 3.8 m (12 ft 6 in); 4.8 m (15 ft 9 in) at stern stabilizers.
- Draft: 4.6 m (15 ft 1 in); Box keel depth (below base-line): 1.2 m (3.9 ft)
- Installed power: Single nuclear reactor, one turbine generator
- Propulsion: 2 × external motors; 2 × propellers; 4 × ducted thrusters (mounted diagonally in two "x-configured" pairs)
- Speed: 4.5 knots (8.3 km/h; 5.2 mph) surfaced; 3.5 knots (6.5 km/h; 4.0 mph) submerged
- Endurance: 210-man-days nominal; 16 days for a 13 person crew; 330-man-days maximum; 25 days for a 13 person crew
- Test depth: 3,000 feet (910 m)
- Complement: 3 officers, 8 crewmen, 2 scientists

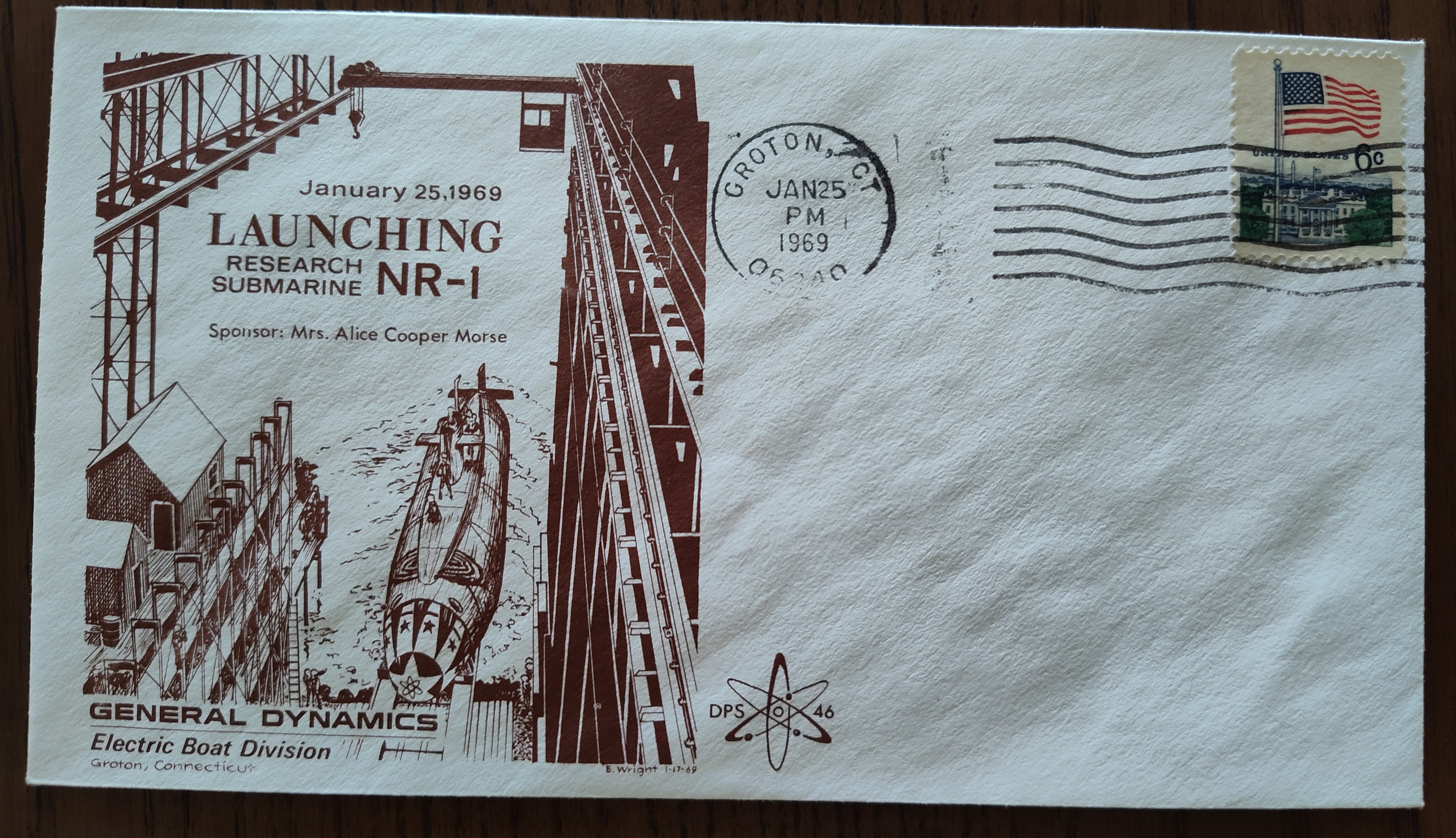
NR-1 Launching Cover

Deep Submergence Vessel NR-1 was a unique United States Navy nuclear-powered ocean engineering and research submarine built by the Electric Boat Division of General Dynamics at Groton, Connecticut. NR-1 was launched on 25 January 1969, completed initial sea trials 19 August 1969, and was home-ported at Naval Submarine Base New London. She was the smallest nuclear submarine ever put into operation, casually known as "Nerwin" and never officially named or commissioned. The U.S. Navy is allocated a specific number of warships by Congress, but Admiral Hyman Rickover avoided using one of those allocations for the construction of NR-1 in order to circumvent the oversight that a warship receives from various bureaus.

== History ==
NR-1's missions included search, object recovery, geological survey, oceanographic research, and installation and maintenance of underwater equipment. NR-1 had the unique capability to remain at one site and completely map or search an area with a high degree of accuracy, which was a valuable asset on several occasions.

In the 1970s and 1980s, NR-1 conducted numerous classified missions involving recovery of objects from the floor of the deep sea. These missions remain classified and few details have been made public. One publicly acknowledged mission in 1976 was to recover parts of an F-14 that were lost from the deck of an aircraft carrier and sank with at least one AIM-54A Phoenix air-to-air missile. The secrecy typical of USN submarine operations was heightened by Rickover's personal involvement, and he shared details of NR-1 operations only on a need-to-know basis. Rickover envisioned building a small fleet of NR-1 type submarines, but only one was built due to budget restrictions.

Following the loss of the Space Shuttle Challenger in 1986, NR-1 was used to search for, identify, and recover critical parts of the Challenger craft. It could remain on the sea floor without resurfacing frequently, and was a major tool for searching deep waters. NR-1 remained submerged and on station even when heavy weather and rough seas hit the area and forced all other search and recovery ships into port.

In October 1994, a survey was done by the NR-1 off the Florida straits 65 km southwest of Key West where it encountered and explored an uncharted sink hole. On 2 December 1998, an advisory committee approved the name "NR-1" for the hole.

In 1995, Robert Ballard used the NR-1 and its support ship MV Carolyn Chouest to explore the wreck of HMHS Britannic, the sister ship of RMS Titanic, which sank off the coast of Greece while serving as a hospital ship during World War I.

On 25 February 2007, NR-1 arrived in Galveston, Texas, towed by Carolyn Chouest, in preparation for an expedition to survey the Flower Garden Banks National Marine Sanctuary and other sites in the Gulf of Mexico.

NR-1 was deactivated on 21 November 2008 at the U.S. Navy submarine base at Groton, Connecticut, defuelled at Portsmouth Naval Shipyard in Kittery, Maine, then sent to Puget Sound Naval Shipyard to be scrapped. On 13 November 2013, the U.S. Navy announced that salvaged pieces of the sub would be put on display at the Submarine Force Library and Museum in Groton.

== Capabilities ==
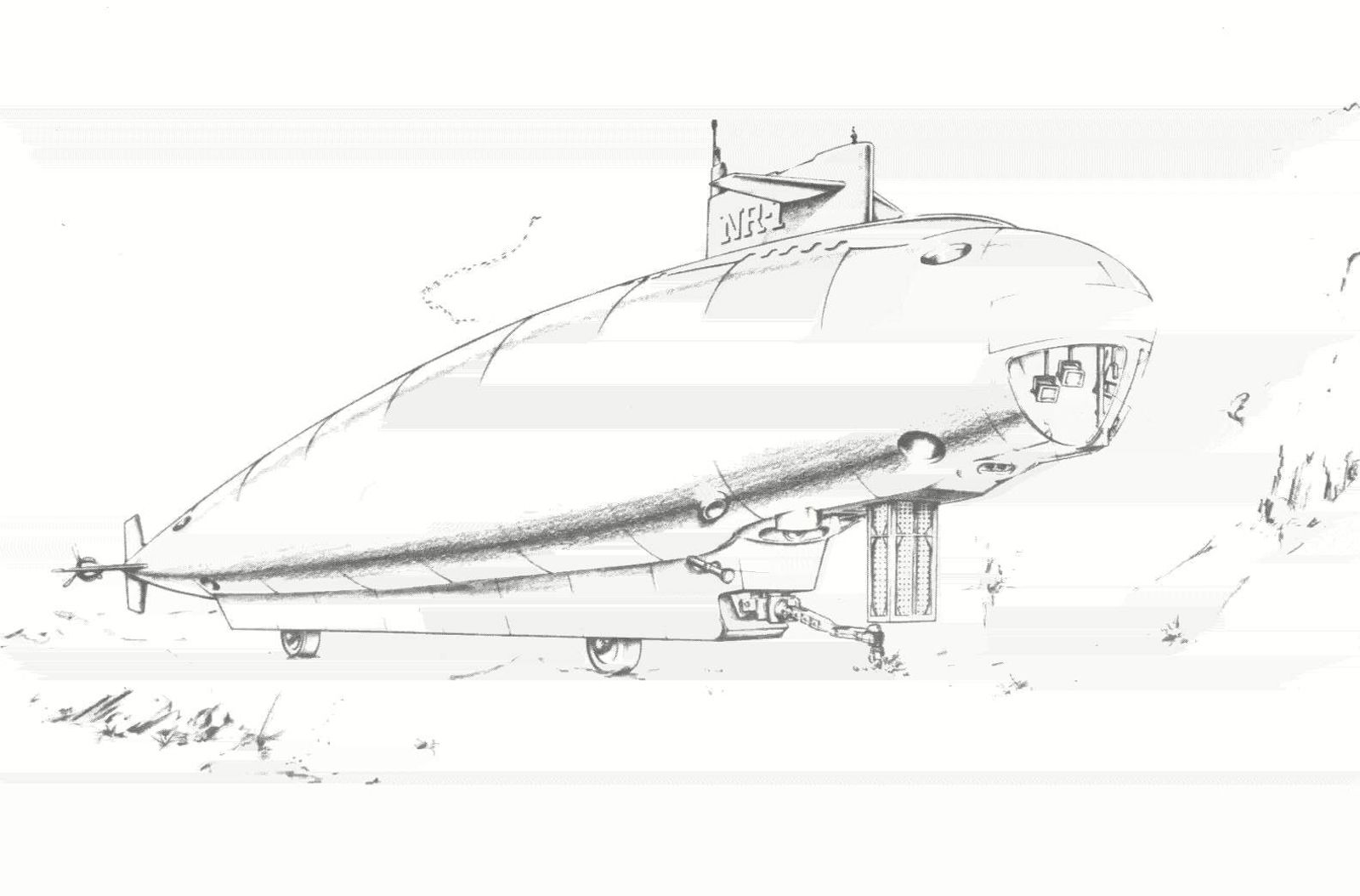
Early design sketch of NR-1

NR-1 performed underwater search and recovery, oceanographic research missions, and installation and maintenance of underwater equipment to a depth of almost half a nautical mile. Its features included extending bottoming wheels, three viewing ports, exterior lighting, television and still cameras for color photographic studies, an object recovery claw, a manipulator that could be fitted with various gripping and cutting tools, and a work basket that could be used in conjunction with the manipulator to deposit or recover items in the sea. Surface vision was provided by a television periscope permanently installed on a fixed mast in her sail area.

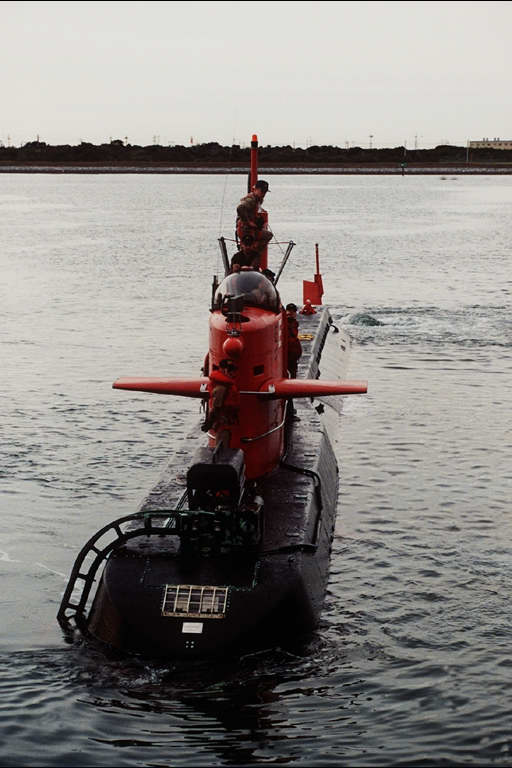
Ducted thrust is visible at NR-1's stern as she maneuvers

NR-1 had sophisticated electronics, computers, and sonar systems that aided in navigation, communications, and object location and identification. It could maneuver or hold a steady position on or close to the seabed or underwater ridges, detect and identify objects at a considerable distance, and lift objects off the ocean floor.

NR-1 was equipped with two electric motor-driven propellers and its maneuverability was enhanced by four ducted thrusters, two forward and two aft. The vehicle had diving planes mounted on the sail, and a conventional rudder.

NR-1 could travel submerged at approximately 4 knots (7.4 km/h; 4.6 mph) for long periods, limited only by consumable supplies—primarily food. It could study and map the ocean bottom, including temperature, currents, and other information for military, commercial, and scientific uses. Its nuclear propulsion provided independence from surface support ships and essentially unlimited endurance.

NR-1's size limited its crew comforts. The crew of about 10 men could stay at sea for as long as a month, but had no kitchen or bathing facilities. They ate frozen TV dinners, bathed once a week with a bucket of water, and burned chlorate candles to produce oxygen. The sub was so slow that it was towed to sea by a surface vessel, and so tiny that the crew felt the push and pull of the ocean's currents. "Everybody on NR-1 got sick," said Allison J. Holifield, who commanded the sub in the mid-1970s. "It was only a matter of whether you were throwing up or not throwing up."

NR-1 was generally towed to and from remote mission locations by an accompanying surface tender, which was also capable of conducting research in conjunction with the submarine. NR-1's last mother ship was MV Carolyn Chouest, which provided towing, communications, berthing, and direct mission support for all NR-1 operations—a versatile platform and an indispensable member of the NR-1 deep submergence team. NR-1 command was crewed with thirty-five Navy personnel and ten civilian contractor personnel. NR-1 carried as many as thirteen persons (crew and specialists) at one time, including three of the four assigned officers. (The operations officer rode on Carolyn Chouest). All personnel who crewed NR-1 were nuclear-trained and specifically screened and interviewed by the Director, Navy Nuclear Propulsion Program.

== Awards ==

Navy Unit Commendation	Meritorious Unit Commendation with five award stars	Navy E Ribbon with Battle "E" device (6 awards)
National Defense Service Medal with two stars	Global War on Terrorism Service Medal	Sea Service Deployment Ribbon

== See also ==
- USS Albacore (AGSS-569)
- USS Dolphin (AGSS-555)
- USS Jimmy Carter (SSN-23)
- Russian submarine Losharik
- Deep-submergence rescue vehicle
- Fire Ice, a Clive Cussler novel which includes NR-1 as a major plot element
