= São João da Barra =

- Municipality
- Município de São João da Barra
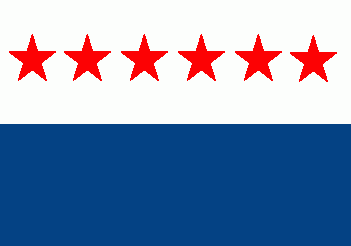
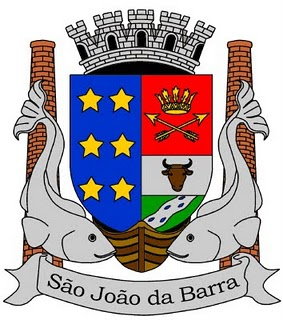
- Flag Coat of arms

- Location of São João da Barra in the state of Rio de Janeiro

- Location of São João da Barra in Brazil
- Coordinates: 21°38′24″S 41°03′03″W
- Country: Brazil
- Region: Southeast
- State: Rio de Janeiro

Government
  - Prefeito: Carla Machado (PP)

Area
  - Total: 458.611 km^{2} (177.071 sq mi)
- Elevation: 12 m (39 ft)

Population (2020)
  - Total: 36,423
- Time zone: UTC−3 (BRT)

São João da Barra (Portuguese pronunciation: [sɐ̃w ʒuˈɐ̃w dɐ ˈbaʁɐ, - ˈʒwɐ̃w -]) is a municipality located in the Brazilian state of Rio de Janeiro. Its population was 36,423 (2020) and its area is 459 km^{2} (177 sq mi). It is home to the Superporto do Açu.

== History ==
Until the arrival of the Portuguese in Brazil in the 16th century, the entire region of the mouth of the Paraíba do Sul River was occupied by the Goitacá Indians. The village was originally settled in 1630 by fishermen from Atafona who decided to relocate following the accidental death of the wife of the village leader. It was originally called São João Batista do Paraíba do Sul. The construction of the Chapel of São João Batista dates from that time, which would give rise to the Vila de São João Batista da Barra. In the 18th century, the village became an important crossing point for sugar from Campos dos Goytacazes towards Salvador. On 17 June 1850, the village was elevated to city status by decree of the Brazilian emperor Dom Pedro II. After a period of decay for most of the 20th century, the city prospered again with the discovery of oil in the Campos Basin at the end of that century.
