= IMR vessel =

An Inspection, Maintenance and Repair (IMR) vessel is a highly technical vessel, deployed in the offshore industry. Their primary task comprises the inspection and repair of subsea facilities and installations. These vessels are often equipped for other tasks including diving support, scale treatment and light construction work.

== Capabilities ==
IMR vessels are designed to continue operations in harsh weather conditions. They are equipped with IMO Class II or Class III Dynamic Positioning Systems and have the latest technology on board. The vessels usually have a large deck area, used for the carriage of auxiliary equipment, spools, containers, etc. The accommodation provides capacity for between 80 and 100 people. The vessels often have a helicopter platform. Most vessels have 1 or 2 cranes for supplies and installation of small-size structures. All vessels have a moon pool installed for the support of ROVs. Many IMR vessels have tanks for the supply of potable fresh water, brine and lubrication oil to the installation and the removal of greywater and sewage from it.

== Operations ==
These multi-purpose vessels' work includes:

- support for one or more ROVs
- survey and maintenance of pipelines
- support for diving
- structural inspections
- scale treatment
- support for laying cables and hoses
- bolt inspection and replacement
- support for drilling
- light construction work
- support for the maintenance of offshore installations
- well stimulation

== Design ==
Modern IMR vessels are designed to operate within a broader operational window, allowing them to function even in extremely harsh weather conditions, including Arctic environments. Many newer vessels carry ice-class notations and are equipped with winterization systems to support such operations.

Recent designs also emphasize environmental sustainability and energy efficiency, incorporating measures to reduce emissions, lower fuel consumption, or use alternative fuels such as LNG, as well as technologies to minimize noise. At the same time, significant attention is given to crew comfort, with vessels often featuring amenities such as a gymnasium, solarium, cinema room, and high-quality kitchen facilities.
