= USCGC Storis (WAGB-21) =

U.S. Coast Guard cutter and icebreaker

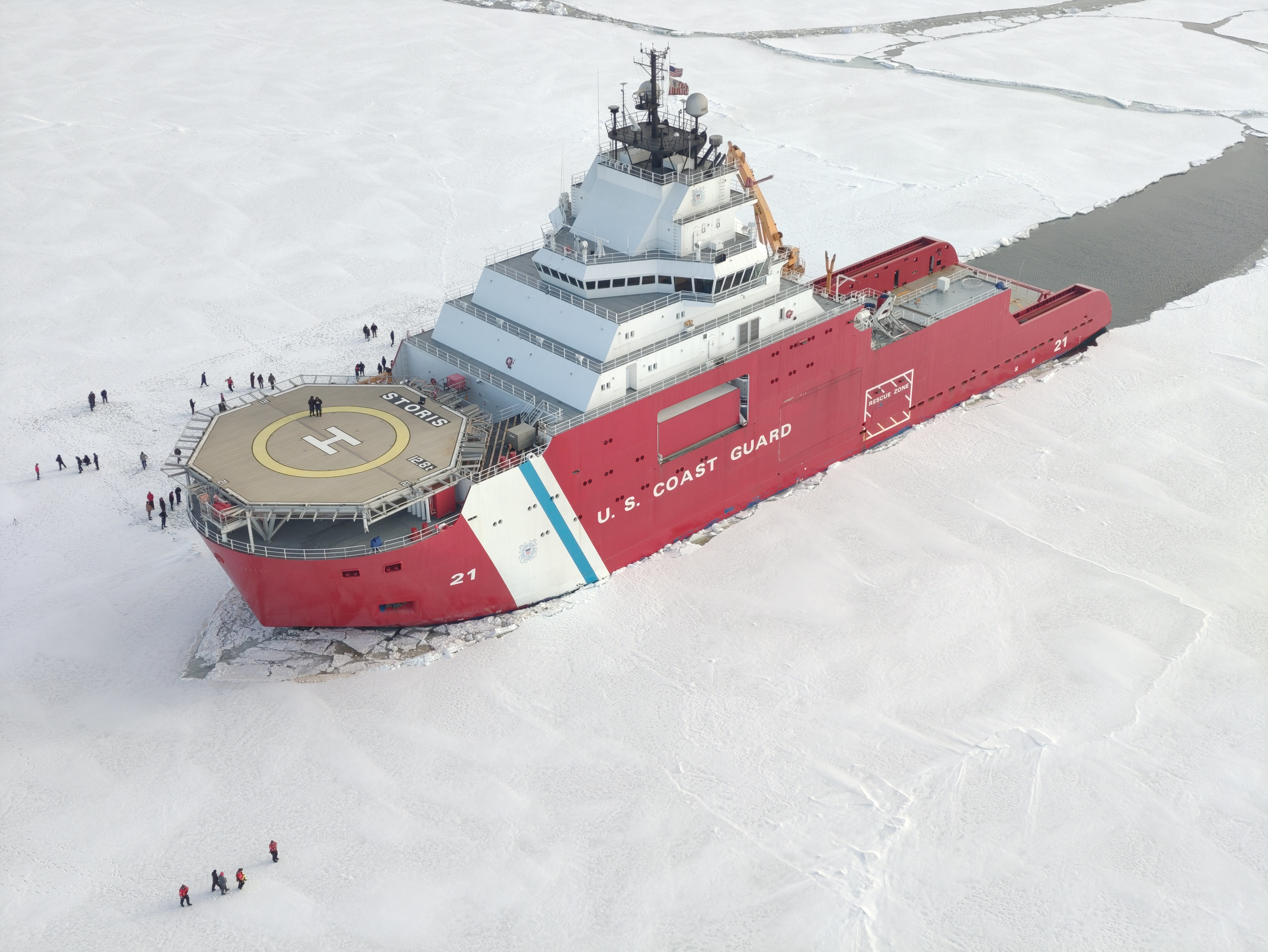
- Storis in the Bering Sea in April 2026

History

United States
- Name: Aiviq
- Namesake: Inupiaq for "walrus"
- Owner: Edison Chouest Offshore
- Port of registry: Galliano, Louisiana
- Ordered: July 2009
- Builder: North American Shipbuilding Company, Larose, Louisiana; LaShip, Houma, Louisiana
- Cost: US$200 million (2011) (equivalent to US$274.33 million in 2024)
- Yard number: 247
- Laid down: 3 February 2010
- Launched: 1 November 2011
- Christened: 24 March 2012
- Completed: 20 April 2012
- In service: 2012–2024
- Identification: Call sign: WDG2524; MMSI number: 367141000
- Fate: Sold to the USCG

United States Coast Guard
- Name: USCGC Storis
- Namesake: USCGC Storis (WMEC-38)
- Operator: United States Coast Guard
- Cost: US$125 million (2024)
- Acquired: 20 December 2024
- Commissioned: 10 August 2025
- Maiden voyage: 4 June 2025
- In service: 2025–
- Home port: Seattle, Washington (temporary); Juneau, Alaska (future)
- Identification: WAGB 21; IMO number: 9579016
- Motto: Breaking through to new horizons
- Status: In service
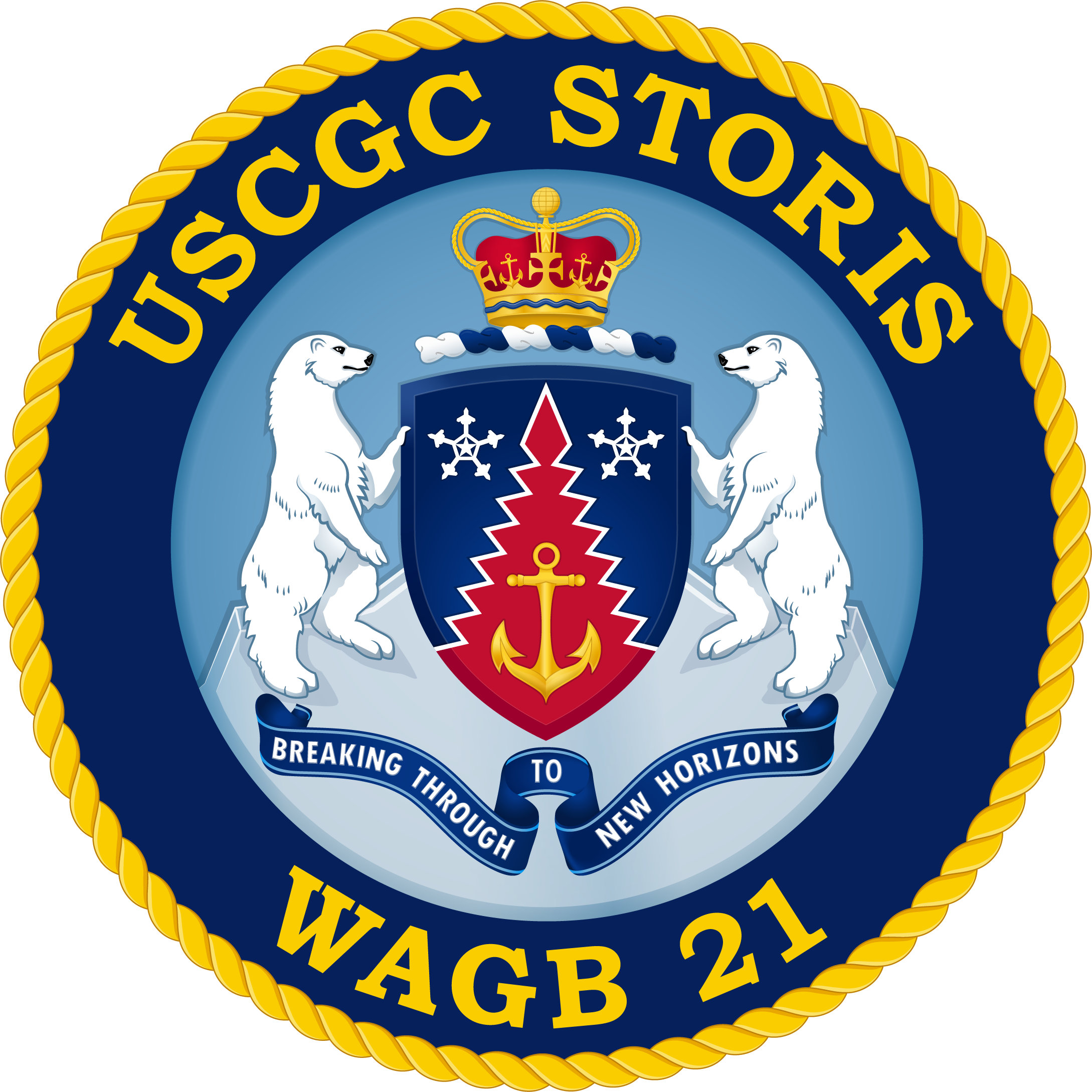
- Badge

General characteristics (as built)
- Type: Anchor handling tug supply vessel (AHTS)
- Tonnage: 12,892 GT; 3,867 NT; 4,129 DWT
- Length: 110 m (360 ft 11 in)
- Beam: 24.4 m (80 ft 1 in)
- Draft: 8.6 m (28 ft 3 in)
- Depth: 10.4 m (34 ft 1 in)
- Ice class: ABS A3
- Installed power: 4 × Caterpillar C280-12 (4 × 4,060 kW)
- Propulsion: Two ducted controllable-pitch propellers; Three bow thrusters and two stern thrusters
- Speed: 15 knots (28 km/h; 17 mph) in open water; 5 knots (9.3 km/h; 5.8 mph) in 1 m (3.3 ft) ice
- Crew: 28; accommodation for 64
- Aviation facilities: Helideck

General characteristics (after refit)
- Type: Medium icebreaker (USCG)
- Notes: Otherwise same as built

USCGC Storis (WAGB-21) is a United States Coast Guard medium icebreaker. She was originally built as the icebreaking anchor handling tug supply vessel (AHTS) Aiviq to support oil exploration and drilling in the Chukchi Sea off Alaska. The USCG acquired the vessel in December 2024 and she was commissioned in Juneau on 10 August 2025.

== General characteristics ==
Storis is 110 metres (360 ft 11 in) long overall and 95.5 metres (313 ft 4 in) between perpendiculars. Her hull has a beam of 24.4 metres (80 ft) and depth of 10.4 metres (34 ft 1 in). Fully laden, she draws 8.6 metres (28 ft 3 in) of water. Built as an anchor handling tug and supply vessel, Storis was originally fitted with a large towing winch located amidships as well as chain lockers and storage tanks for both liquid and dry bulk cargo under the main deck. Her gross tonnage is 12,892, net tonnage 3,867 and deadweight tonnage 4,129 tonnes.

Storis is powered by four 12-cylinder Caterpillar C280-12 four stroke medium speed diesel engines, each producing 4,060 kW (5,440 hp) at 1,000 rpm. The engines are coupled to two 4.6-metre (15 ft) Schottel controllable-pitch propeller in nozzles via Flender reduction gearboxes. The propulsion system gives Storis a service speed of 15 knots (28 km/h; 17 mph) in open water and 5 knots (9.3 km/h; 5.8 mph) in 1-metre (3 ft 3 in) level ice, and a bollard pull of 200 metric tons. She also has two 2,000 kW shaft generators and four 1,700 kW Caterpillar 3512C auxiliary diesel generators that provide power for onboard consumers, including the firefighting system. She has three bow thrusters, one of them of azimuthing fold-down type, and two stern thrusters that give her dynamic positioning capability. For redundancy and improved handling, she has two high-lift rudders. The propellers of Storis were reportedly designed to be quieter than normal in order to be less disruptive to local marine life.

Storis was built to American Bureau of Shipping ice class ABS A3 which indicates that she is strengthened for navigation in polar ice conditions with the presence of multiyear ice floes. Furthermore, the notation "Ice Breaker" states that she is designed and constructed for breaking ice to open navigable channels for other ships.

== Construction ==
In July 2009, Edison Chouest Offshore won a $150 million contract for the construction of an icebreaking anchor handling tug supply (AHTS) vessel for Royal Dutch Shell. The 360-foot (110 m) vessel, largest ever built by the company, would be used to support Shell's drilling operations in the Beaufort Sea and Chukchi Sea off Alaska. In January 2010, it was announced that the vessel would be constructed in Louisiana. The hull and the superstructure would be built in the company's own shipyard North American Shipbuilding Company in Larose in two separate units while the final assembly of the vessel would take place at LaShip, also owned by Edison Chouest, in Houma. In all, the construction would take just over two years and provide work for about 800 people.

Laid down on 3 February 2010, the newbuilding "Hull 247" was presented to Shell executives on 30 September 2011. By then, the price of the vessel had climbed to $200 million due to material and equipment factors, such as the price of steel. The vessel was launched on 1 November 2011. According to Edison Chouest spokesman Gary Chouest, "It [Aiviq] will be the world's largest and most powerful anchor-handling icebreaker." The vessel has also been called the world's most powerful privately owned icebreaker.

In 2011, Shell invited Inupiak schoolchildren to submit essays suggesting names for the vessel. Twelve-year-old Elizabeth Itta submitted the winning essay, describing how the Walrus, "Aiviq" in the Inupiak language, use their tusks to break ice. She won a cash prize for her school and an invitation to attend the ship's launching ceremony on 24 March 2012. The vessel went for sea trials in April and was delivered on 20 April 2012.

The construction of the new icebreaker and Shell's Arctic drilling operation off Alaska raised concerns about the ability of the United States Coast Guard to operate in ice-infested waters since at the time the Coast Guard had only one operational icebreaker, USCGC Healy.

In April 2015, it was reported that Edison Chouest would build two Polar Class 3 anchor-handling tug supply (AHTS) vessels at the company's LaShip shipyard in Houma, Louisiana. Unlike Aiviq, the new vessels would have been fitted with Rolls-Royce azimuth thrusters instead of conventional shaftlines and rudders. However, in November 2015 it was reported that Edison Chouest might have canceled the vessels following Shell's decision to halt Arctic oil exploration.

== Career ==
=== Aiviq (2012–2024) ===
==== 2012 grounding of Kulluk ====
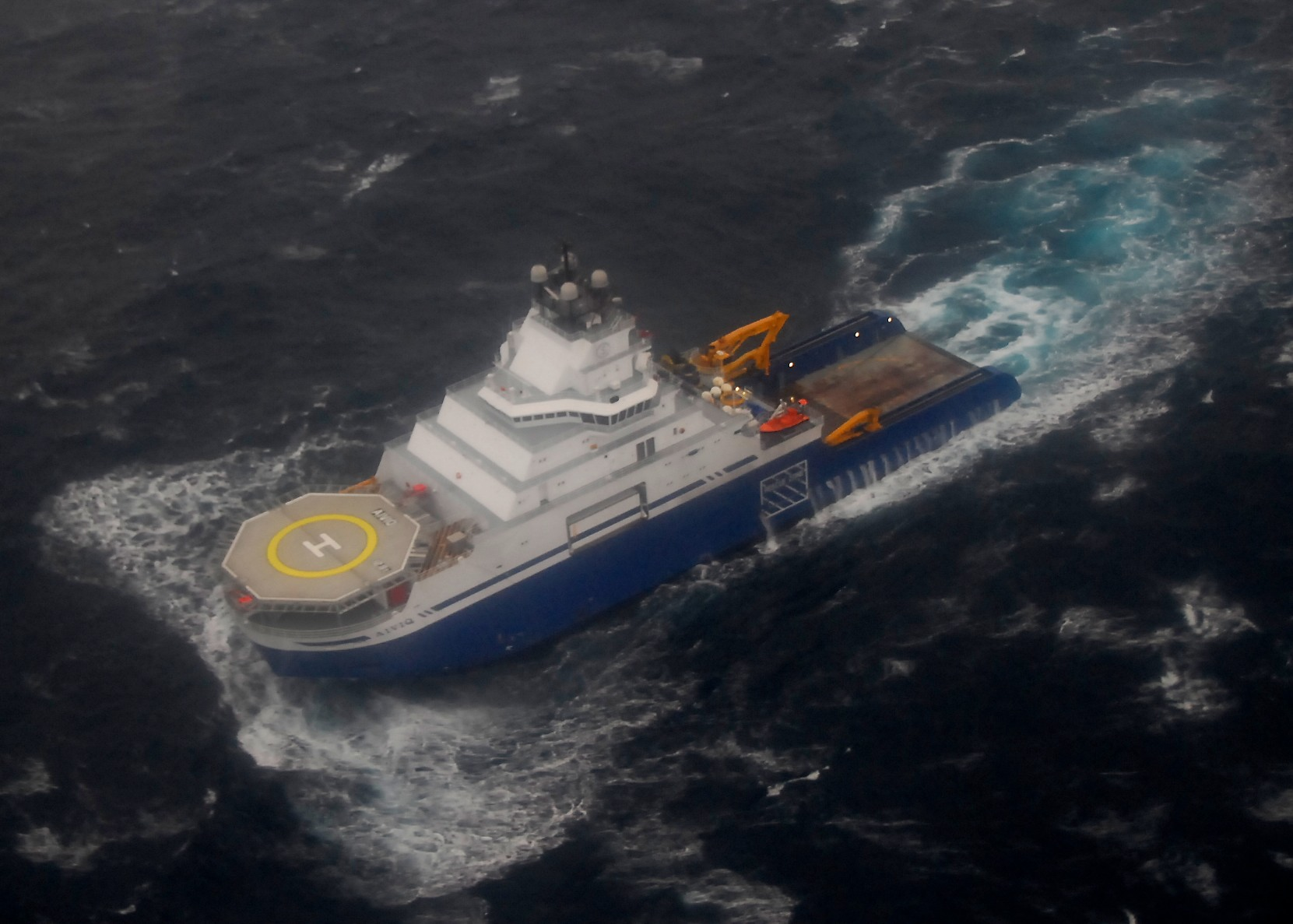
Aiviq in heavy seas on 30 December 2012.

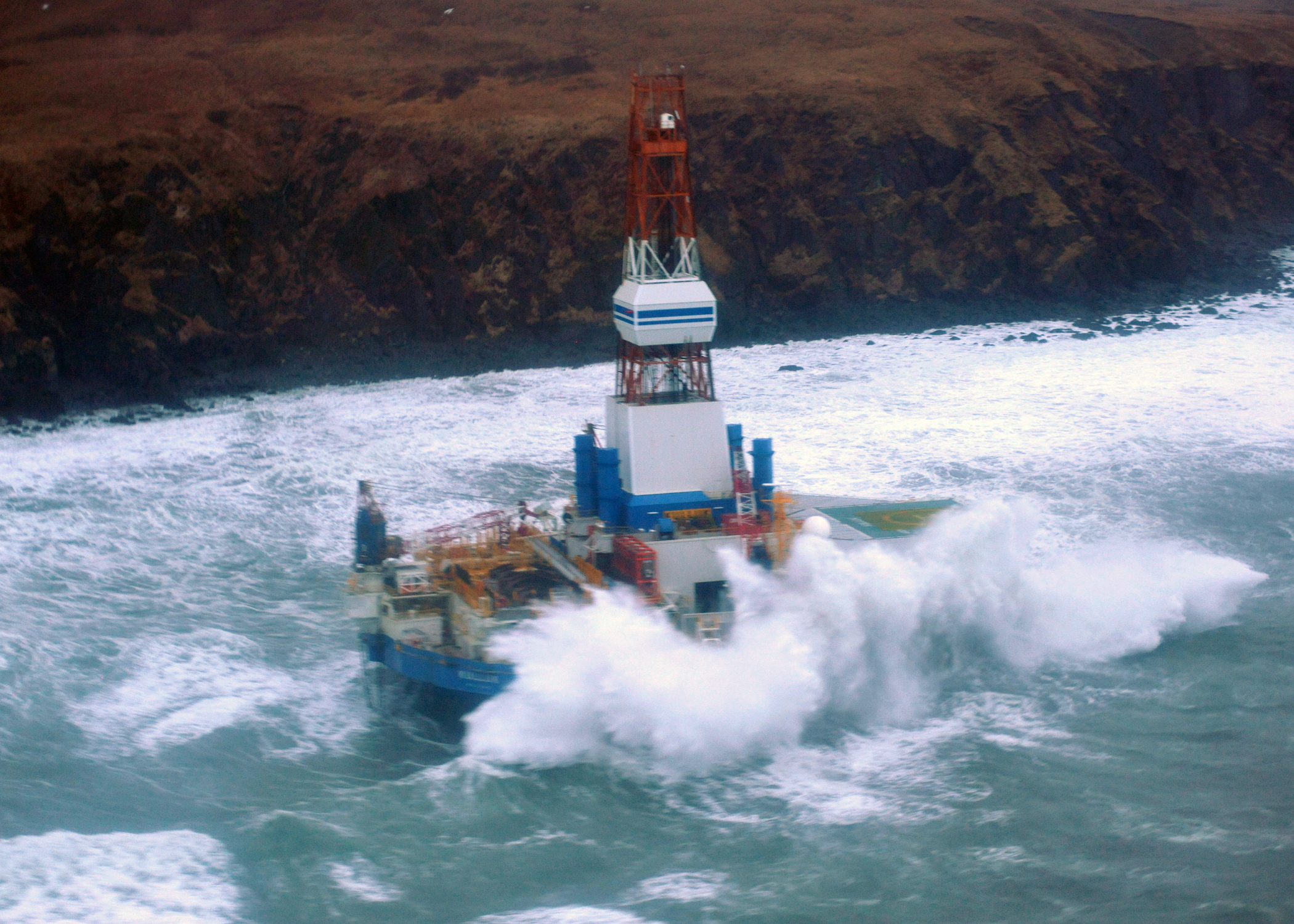
Kulluk aground on the southeast side of Sitkalidak Island, Alaska, on 1 January 2013.

On 27 December 2012, while Aiviq was towing the mobile offshore drilling unit Kulluk off the coast of Kodiak Island, Alaska, the towing line between the icebreaker and the drilling rig parted due to a mechanical failure of the towing shackle. Shortly after the tow had been regained, the main engines of Aiviq failed and the vessel lost propulsion power in 20-foot (6 m) seas. In the following morning, power was successfully restored on one of the four main engines and the vessel was able to hold position in the heavy weather. United States Coast Guard cutter USCGC Alex Haley was dispatched to the scene to monitor the situation. In response to the incident, the Coast Guard, Shell and Edison Chouest established a Unified Command to coordinate the operation. Shell-contracted vessels Guardsman and Nanuq were also en route to the scene.

On 29 December, the Unified Command authorized the drilling rig to drop its anchor to slow its drift towards the coast and ordered the Coast Guard to evacuate the 18 crew members on Kulluk by helicopter as a precaution. Sikorsky HH-60 Jayhawk helicopters operated by the Coast Guard also delivered essential equipment parts to Aiviq and later power was restored on all four engines. Together with Nanuq, Aiviq was able to hold the drilling rig stationary during the crew evacuation and later continue towing the vessel away from the coast.

On 30 December, the tow lines of Aiviq and Nanuq parted again, and Kulluk began drifting towards the coast. Another tugboat, the 10,000-horsepower Alert operated by Crowley Marine Services, also arrived to the scene from Prince William Sound. Shortly after midnight, Alert was able to secure connection to the 400-foot (120 m) towing line previously used by Aiviq and later in the morning the icebreaker had also reconnected to Kulluk about 19 nautical miles (35 km; 22 mi) southeast from Kodiak Island. USCGC Alex Haley also returned to the scene from Kodiak, where the cutter had repaired her fouled port propeller, and relieved the crew of USCGC Spar as on scene commander. The helicopter crews were also preparing to deploy several technicians aboard the drilling rig to evaluate the condition of the towing lines.

Later in the evening, Kulluk was again set adrift after the Coast Guard ordered Alert to separate from the rig, now only 4 nautical miles (7.4 km; 4.6 mi) from the nearest point of land, to maintain the safety of the nine crew members on board the tug in nearly 30-foot (9.1 m) seas. Only moments later, Kulluk was grounded near the uninhabited Sitkalidak Island at a depth of about 32–48 feet (9.8–14.6 m).

The salvage operation was awarded to the Dutch salvage company Smit International. A team of five salvage experts boarded Kulluk on 2 January 2013 to assess the structural integrity of the grounded drilling barge. On 3 January, it was reported that Kulluk had suffered damage since the grounding but its structural integrity had not been compromised and there have been no leaks from the rig's fuel tanks. At the time of the grounding, Kulluk was carrying 139,000 gallons of diesel fuel and 12,000 gallons of lubricating and hydraulic oil. By 4 January, 14 vessels had been mobilized for the recovery operation and the United States Department of Defense provided two Boeing CH-47 Chinook helicopters to transport heavy salvage gear to the site.

Kulluk was successfully refloated on 6 January and towed to a sheltered location in Kiliuda Bay, some 30 nautical miles (56 km; 35 mi) from the original grounding location, on the following day. After the rig was brought to a shipyard in Singapore on board a heavy-lift vessel, Shell decided not to repair the damages and sold the drilling unit for recycling in China.

In the investigation report published by the United States Coast Guard on 2 April 2014, the initiating event to the casualty was identified as the failure of a 120-ton apex shackle which was considered undersized for towing Kulluk in such environmental conditions. The 90-feet catenary surge chain used to damp shock loads in the towing line was also deemed insufficient. According to the Coast Guard, the "numerous and compounding preconditions" that led to the casualty also included various operational issues such as the towing plans that were not adequate for the winter towing operation crossing the Gulf of Alaska and the crew's lack of towing experience in the Gulf of Alaska waters particularly during the wintertime.

In the same report, it was also concluded that the likely cause for Aiviq's loss of main engine power was sea water in the fuel oil. After the casualty, sea water contamination was found in settling tanks, day tanks, main engine primary filters and main engine injectors. The design of the vessel allowed considerable amount of sea water to enter the stern deck and subsequently to the fuel oil tanks through overflow vents in heavy weather. There were also problems with fuel management practices onboard Aiviq.

Kulluk's movement south for the winter was at least in part motivated by an effort to avoid State of Alaska property taxes on oil and gas extraction equipment.

==== 2015 proposed sale to the US Coast Guard ====
On 14 May 2015, US Congressman Duncan Hunter of California, began advocating for the acquisition of Aiviq by the US Coast Guard (USCG) due to an availability gap caused by USCG's deactivation of the icebreaker USCGC Polar Sea. USCG repeatedly turned down Hunter's continued proposals, citing the vessel's unsuitability for military operations and being less-capable than USCGC Healy, with Coast Guard Admiral Charles Michel stating Aiviq is "Not suitable for military service without substantial refit. [...] We have very specific requirements for our vessels, including international law requirements for assertion of things like navigation rights. This vessel does not just break ice."

Controversy arose after it was published that Congressman Hunter had received campaign funding from Aiviq's owner, Edison Chouest Offshore, and contributors connected to the owner, six days before initially advocating the vessel's sale to USCG. Edison Chouest's contributions to Hunter have made them the congressman's second largest donor. The company's donations came as Congressman Hunter was under investigation for misuse of campaign funds. On 12 July 2016, Hunter's advocacy for the vessel's acquisition was joined by US Congressman Don Young of Alaska. Aiviq's owner was Congressman Young's largest campaign donor at that time.

Congressman Hunter's office estimated it would cost US$33 million a year to lease, or US$150 million to buy Aiviq outright.

==== Proposed sale to Canada ====
In 2016, Davie Shipbuilding offered Aiviq together with other out-of-work offshore icebreakers to the Canadian Coast Guard as a replacement for CCGS Louis S. St-Laurent. However, recent reports indicate that the Canadian Coast Guard is not interested in the vessel. In June 2018, it was announced that the Canadian government ended up partnering with Davie Shipbuilding, but using three ships from Viking Supply Ships.

==== Later career ====
After years of lay-up, Aiviq was chartered by Australian Antarctic Division to support Davis Station refueling and other Antarctic missions during the 2021–2022 and 2022–2023 seasons.

=== USCGC Storis (2024–) ===
On 1 March 2024 the United States Coast Guard issued a notice that they planned to solicit Offshore Surface Vessels LLC for a contract to acquire and service a domestically produced, commercially available icebreaker. Aiviq was the only such vessel to meet these previously specified criteria.

The Coast Guard was appropriated $125 million in fiscal year 2024 to purchase Aiviq. The vessel would be homeported in Juneau, Alaska and was expected to reach initial operational capability in 2026. A contract for the vessel's purchase was issued in late December 2024. After photographs of the ship in red USCG livery were published online, the Coast Guard confirmed that the vessel would be renamed USCGC Storis (WAGB-21) after a 1942-built medium endurance cutter that, among other accomplishments in the Arctic, became the first United States vessel to circumnavigate North America via the Northwest Passage.

On 4 June 2025, Storis departed on her maiden voyage with a hybrid crew consisting of Coast Guard personnel and civilian mariners. The cutter was commissioned in Juneau on 10 August 2025 but will be temporarily homeported in Seattle together with the other USCG icebreakers until the port facilities in Alaska have been upgraded.
