= List of current ships of the United States Navy =

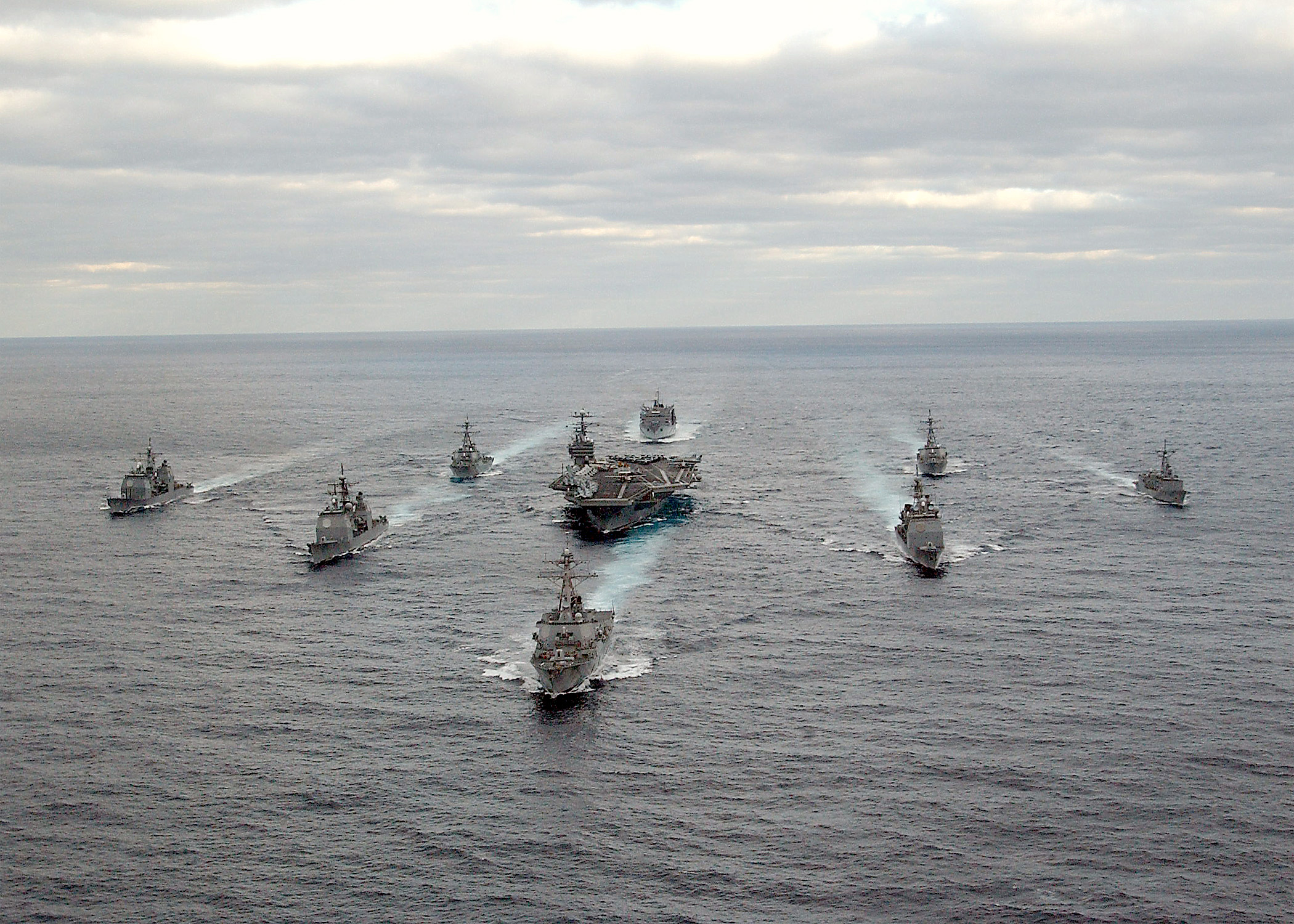
USS George Washington Carrier Strike Group underway in the Atlantic

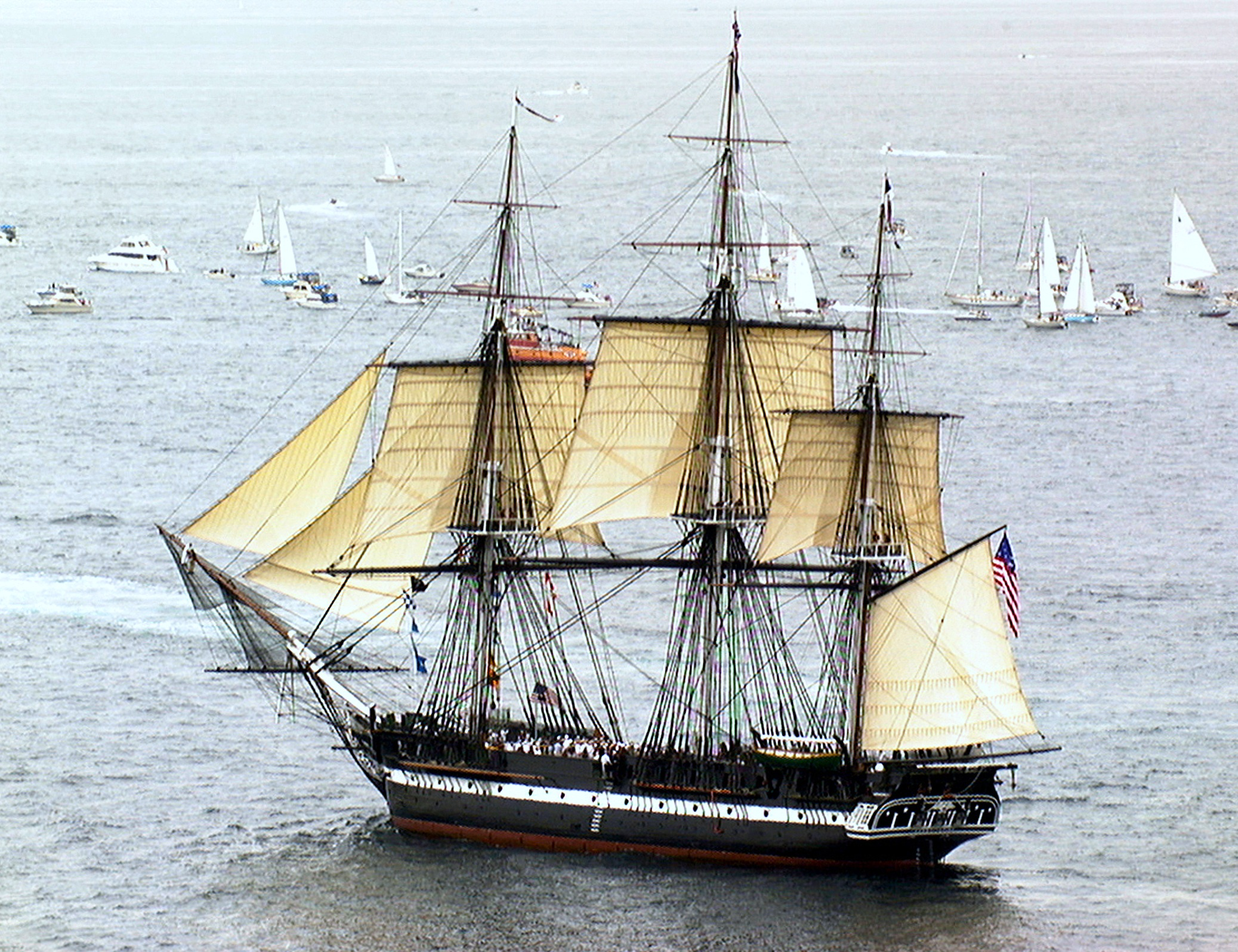
USS Constitution under sail for the first time in 116 years on 21 July 1997

The United States Navy has approximately 460 ships in both active service and the reserve fleet; of these approximately 30 ships are proposed or scheduled for retirement by 2028, while approximately 85 new ships are in either the planning and ordering stages or under construction, according to the Naval Vessel Register and published reports. This list includes ships that are owned and leased by the US Navy; ships that are formally commissioned, by way of ceremony, and non-commissioned. Ships denoted with the prefix "USS" are commissioned ships. Prior to commissioning, ships may be described as a pre-commissioning unit or PCU, but are officially referred to by name with no prefix. US Navy support ships are often non-commissioned ships organized and operated by Military Sealift Command. Among these support ships, those denoted "USNS" are owned by the US Navy. Those denoted by "MV" or "SS" are chartered.

Current ships include commissioned warships that are in active service, as well as ships that are part of Military Sealift Command, the support component and the Ready Reserve Force, that while non-commissioned, are still part of the effective force of the US Navy. Future ships listed are those that are in the planning stages, or are currently under construction, from having the keel laid to fitting out and final sea trials.

There exist a number of former US Navy ships which are museum ships (not listed here), some of which may be US government-owned. One of these, USS Constitution, a three-masted tall ship, is one of the original six frigates of the United States Navy. She is the oldest naval vessel afloat, and still retains her commission (and hence is listed here), as a special commemoration for that ship alone.

== Current ships ==
This is an alphabetical list of current United States Navy ships by name. For the list by class, see List of equipment of the United States Navy.

=== Commissioned ===
Ship name	Hull number	Class	Type	Commission date	Homeport	Note
USS Abraham Lincoln	CVN-72	Nimitz	Aircraft carrier	11 Nov 1989	San Diego, CA	
USS Alabama	SSBN-731	Ohio	Ballistic missile submarine	25 May 1985	Bangor, WA	
USS Alaska	SSBN-732	Ohio	Ballistic missile submarine	25 Jan 1986	Kings Bay, GA	
USS Albany	SSN-753	Los Angeles	Attack submarine	7 Apr 1990	Norfolk, VA	
USS America	LHA-6	America	Amphibious assault ship	11 Oct 2014	Sasebo, Japan	
USS Anchorage	LPD-23	San Antonio	Amphibious transport dock	4 May 2013	San Diego, CA	
USS Annapolis	SSN-760	Los Angeles	Attack submarine	11 Apr 1992	Apra Harbor, GU	
USS Arleigh Burke	DDG-51	Arleigh Burke	Destroyer	4 Jul 1991	Rota, Spain	
USS Arlington	LPD-24	San Antonio	Amphibious transport dock	6 Apr 2013	Norfolk, VA	
USS Asheville	SSN-758	Los Angeles	Attack submarine	28 Sep 1991	Apra Harbor, GU	
USS Ashland	LSD-48	Whidbey Island	Dock landing ship	9 May 1992	Sasebo, Japan	Scheduled to be decommissioned 2024
USS Augusta	LCS-34	Independence	Littoral combat ship	Sep 30, 2023	San Diego, CA	
USS Bainbridge	DDG-96	Arleigh Burke	Destroyer	12 Nov 2005	Norfolk, VA	
USS Barry	DDG-52	Arleigh Burke	Destroyer	12 Dec 1992	Everett, WA	
USS Bataan	LHD-5	Wasp	Amphibious assault ship	20 Sep 1997	Norfolk, VA	
USS Beloit	LCS-29	Freedom	Littoral combat ship	23 Nov 2024	Mayport, FL	
USS Benfold	DDG-65	Arleigh Burke	Destroyer	30 Mar 1996	Yokosuka, Japan	
USS Billings	LCS-15	Freedom	Littoral combat ship	3 Aug 2019	Mayport, FL	Proposed to be decommissioned 2023
USS Blue Ridge	LCC-19	Blue Ridge	Amphibious command ship	14 Nov 1970	Yokosuka, Japan	Oldest deployed ship
USS Boxer	LHD-4	Wasp	Amphibious assault ship	11 Feb 1995	San Diego, CA	
USS Bulkeley	DDG-84	Arleigh Burke	Destroyer	8 Dec 2001	Norfolk, VA	
USS California	SSN-781	Virginia	Attack submarine	29 Oct 2011	Groton, CT	
USS Canberra	LCS-30	Independence	Littoral combat ship	22 Jul 2023	San Diego, CA	
USS Cape St. George	CG-71	Ticonderoga	Cruiser	12 Jun 1993	Everett, WA	
USS Carl M. Levin	DDG-120	Arleigh Burke	Destroyer	24 Jun 2023	Pearl Harbor, HI	
USS Carl Vinson	CVN-70	Nimitz	Aircraft carrier	13 Mar 1982	San Diego, CA	
USS Carney	DDG-64	Arleigh Burke	Destroyer	13 Apr 1996	Mayport, FL	
USS Carter Hall	LSD-50	Harpers Ferry	Dock landing ship	30 Sep 1995	Little Creek, VA	Scheduled to be decommissioned 2023
USS Chafee	DDG-90	Arleigh Burke	Destroyer	18 Oct 2003	Pearl Harbor, HI	
USS Charleston	LCS-18	Independence	Littoral combat ship	2 Mar 2019	San Diego, CA	
USS Charlotte	SSN-766	Los Angeles	Attack submarine	16 Sep 1994	Pearl Harbor, HI	
USS Cheyenne	SSN-773	Los Angeles	Attack submarine	13 Sep 1996	Portsmouth, NH	
USS Chief	MCM-14	Avenger	Mine countermeasures ship	5 Nov 1994	Sasebo, Japan	
USS Chosin	CG-65	Ticonderoga	Cruiser	12 Jan 1991	Pearl Harbor, HI	
USS Chung-Hoon	DDG-93	Arleigh Burke	Destroyer	18 Sep 2004	Pearl Harbor, HI	
USS Cincinnati	LCS-20	Independence	Littoral combat ship	5 Oct 2019	San Diego, CA	
USS Cleveland	LCS-31	Freedom	Littoral combat ship	16 May 2026	Mayport, FL	
USS Cole	DDG-67	Arleigh Burke	Destroyer	8 Jun 1996	Norfolk, VA	
USS Colorado	SSN-788	Virginia	Attack submarine	17 Mar 2018	Pearl Harbor, HI	
USS Columbia	SSN-771	Los Angeles	Attack submarine	9 Oct 1995	Pearl Harbor, HI	
USS Columbus	SSN-762	Los Angeles	Attack submarine	24 Jul 1993	Norfolk, VA	
USS Comstock	LSD-45	Whidbey Island	Dock landing ship	3 Feb 1990	San Diego, CA	Scheduled to be decommissioned 2026
USS Connecticut	SSN-22	Seawolf	Attack submarine	11 Dec 1998	Bangor, WA	
USS Constitution	—	Original six frigates	Classic frigate	1 Oct 1797	Boston, MA	The oldest commissioned vessel in the US Navy^{A}
USS Cooperstown	LCS-23	Freedom	Littoral combat ship	6 May 2023	Mayport, FL	
USS Curtis Wilbur	DDG-54	Arleigh Burke	Destroyer	19 Mar 1994	San Diego, CA	
USS Daniel Inouye	DDG-118	Arleigh Burke	Destroyer	8 Dec 2021	Pearl Harbor, HI	
USS Decatur	DDG-73	Arleigh Burke	Destroyer	29 Aug 1998	San Diego, CA	
USS Delaware	SSN-791	Virginia	Attack submarine	4 Apr 2020	Groton, CT	
USS Delbert D. Black	DDG-119	Arleigh Burke	Destroyer	26 Sep 2020	Mayport, FL	
USS Dewey	DDG-105	Arleigh Burke	Destroyer	6 Mar 2010	San Diego, CA	
USS Donald Cook	DDG-75	Arleigh Burke	Destroyer	4 Dec 1998	Mayport, FL	
USS Dwight D. Eisenhower	CVN-69	Nimitz	Aircraft carrier	18 Oct 1977	Norfolk, VA	Scheduled to be decommissioned 2027
USS Emory S. Land	AS-39	Emory S. Land	Submarine tender	7 Jul 1979	Apra Harbor, GU	
USS Essex	LHD-2	Wasp	Amphibious assault ship	24 Aug 1992	San Diego, CA	
USS Farragut	DDG-99	Arleigh Burke	Destroyer	10 Jun 2006	Mayport, FL	
USS Fitzgerald	DDG-62	Arleigh Burke	Destroyer	14 Oct 1995	San Diego, CA	
USS Florida	SSGN-728	Ohio	Guided missile submarine	18 Jun 1983	Kings Bay, GA	Scheduled to be decommissioned 2026
USS Forrest Sherman	DDG-98	Arleigh Burke	Destroyer	28 Jan 2006	Norfolk, VA	
USS Fort Lauderdale	LPD-28	San Antonio	Amphibious transport dock	30 Jul 2022	Norfolk, VA	
USS Frank Cable	AS-40	Emory S. Land	Submarine tender	29 Oct 1979	Apra Harbor, GU	
USS Frank E. Petersen Jr.	DDG-121	Arleigh Burke	Destroyer	14 May 2022	Pearl Harbor, HI	
USS Gabrielle Giffords	LCS-10	Independence	Littoral combat ship	10 Jun 2017	San Diego, CA	
USS George Washington	CVN-73	Nimitz	Aircraft carrier	4 Jul 1992	Yokosuka, Japan	
USS George H.W. Bush	CVN-77	Nimitz	Aircraft carrier	10 Jan 2009	Norfolk, VA	
USS Gerald R. Ford	CVN-78	Gerald R. Ford	Aircraft carrier	22 Jul 2017	Norfolk, VA	
USS Gettysburg	CG-64	Ticonderoga	Cruiser	22 Jun 1991	Mayport, FL	
USS Gonzalez	DDG-66	Arleigh Burke	Destroyer	12 Oct 1996	Norfolk, VA	
USS Gravely	DDG-107	Arleigh Burke	Destroyer	20 Nov 2010	Norfolk, VA	
USS Green Bay	LPD-20	San Antonio	Amphibious transport dock	24 Jan 2006	Sasebo, Japan	
USS Greeneville	SSN-772	Los Angeles	Attack submarine	16 Feb 1996	San Diego, CA	
USS Gridley	DDG-101	Arleigh Burke	Destroyer	10 Feb 2007	Everett, WA	
USS Gunston Hall	LSD-44	Whidbey Island	Dock landing ship	22 Apr 1989	Little Creek, VA	Scheduled to be decommissioned 2023
USS Halsey	DDG-97	Arleigh Burke	Destroyer	30 Jul 2005	Pearl Harbor, HI	
USS Hampton	SSN-767	Los Angeles	Attack submarine	6 Nov 1993	San Diego, CA	
USS Harpers Ferry	LSD-49	Harpers Ferry	Dock landing ship	7 Jan 1995	San Diego, CA	Scheduled to be decommissioned 2024
USS Harry S. Truman	CVN-75	Nimitz	Aircraft carrier	25 Jul 1998	Norfolk, VA	
USS Hartford	SSN-768	Los Angeles	Attack submarine	10 Dec 1994	Groton, CT	
USS Harvey C. Barnum Jr.	DDG-124	Arleigh Burke	Destroyer	11 Apr 2026	Norfolk, VA	
USS Hawaii	SSN-776	Virginia	Attack submarine	5 May 2007	Pearl Harbor, HI	
USS Henry M. Jackson	SSBN-730	Ohio	Ballistic missile submarine	6 Oct 1984	Bangor, WA	
USS Hershel "Woody" Williams	ESB-4	Lewis B. Puller	Expeditionary mobile base	7 Mar 2020	Norfolk, VA	
USS Higgins	DDG-76	Arleigh Burke	Destroyer	24 Apr 1999	San Diego, CA	
USS Hopper	DDG-70	Arleigh Burke	Destroyer	6 Sep 1997	Pearl Harbor, HI	
USS Howard	DDG-83	Arleigh Burke	Destroyer	20 Oct 2001	San Diego, CA	
USS Hyman G. Rickover	SSN-795	Virginia	Attack submarine	14 Oct 2023	Groton, CT	
USS Idaho	SSN-799	Virginia	Attack submarine	25 April 2026	Groton, CT	
USS Illinois	SSN-786	Virginia	Attack submarine	29 Oct 2016	Pearl Harbor, HI	
USS Indiana	SSN-789	Virginia	Attack submarine	29 Sep 2018	Pearl Harbor, HI	
USS Indianapolis	LCS-17	Freedom	Littoral combat ship	26 Oct 2019	Mayport, FL	Proposed to be decommissioned 2023
USS Iowa	SSN-797	Virginia	Attack submarine	5 Apr 2025	Groton, CT	
USS Iwo Jima	LHD-7	Wasp	Amphibious assault ship	30 Jun 2001	Mayport, FL	
USS Jackson	LCS-6	Independence	Littoral combat ship	5 Dec 2015	San Diego, CA	Scheduled to be decommissioned 2025
USS Jack H. Lucas	DDG-125	Arleigh Burke	Destroyer	7 Oct 2023	San Diego, CA	
USS James E. Williams	DDG-95	Arleigh Burke	Destroyer	11 Dec 2004	Norfolk, VA	
USS Jason Dunham	DDG-109	Arleigh Burke	Destroyer	13 Nov 2010	Mayport, FL	
USS Jefferson City	SSN-759	Los Angeles	Attack submarine	29 Feb 1992	Apra Harbor, GU	
USS Jimmy Carter	SSN-23	Seawolf	Attack submarine	19 Feb 2005	Bangor, WA	
USS John Basilone	DDG-122	Arleigh Burke	Destroyer	9 Nov 2024	Mayport, FL	
USS John C. Stennis	CVN-74	Nimitz	Aircraft carrier	9 Dec 1995	Bremerton, WA	
USS John Finn	DDG-113	Arleigh Burke	Destroyer	15 Jul 2017	San Diego, CA	
USS John L. Canley	ESB-6	Lewis B. Puller	Expeditionary mobile base	17 Feb 2024	San Diego, CA	
USS John P. Murtha	LPD-26	San Antonio	Amphibious transport dock	8 Oct 2016	San Diego, CA	
USS John Paul Jones	DDG-53	Arleigh Burke	Destroyer	18 Dec 1993	Everett, WA	
USS John S. McCain	DDG-56	Arleigh Burke	Destroyer	2 Jul 1994	Everett, WA	
USS John Warner	SSN-785	Virginia	Attack submarine	1 Aug 2015	Norfolk, VA	
USS Kansas City	LCS-22	Independence	Littoral combat ship	20 Jun 2020	San Diego, CA	
USS Kearsarge	LHD-3	Wasp	Amphibious assault ship	16 Oct 1993	Norfolk, VA	
USS Kentucky	SSBN-737	Ohio	Ballistic missile submarine	13 Jul 1991	Bangor, WA	
USS Kidd	DDG-100	Arleigh Burke	Destroyer	9 Jun 2007	Everett, WA	
USS Kingsville	LCS-36	Independence	Littoral combat ship	24 Aug 2024	San Diego, CA	
USS Laboon	DDG-58	Arleigh Burke	Destroyer	18 Mar 1995	Norfolk, VA	
USS Lassen	DDG-82	Arleigh Burke	Destroyer	21 Apr 2001	Mayport, FL	
USS Lenah Sutcliffe Higbee	DDG-123	Arleigh Burke	Destroyer	13 May 2023	San Diego, CA	
USS Lewis B. Puller	ESB-3	Lewis B. Puller	Expeditionary mobile base	17 Aug 2017	Norfolk, VA	
USS Louisiana	SSBN-743	Ohio	Ballistic missile submarine	6 Sep 1997	Bangor, WA	
USS Mahan	DDG-72	Arleigh Burke	Destroyer	14 Feb 1998	Norfolk, VA	
USS Maine	SSBN-741	Ohio	Ballistic missile submarine	29 Jul 1995	Bangor, WA	
USS Makin Island	LHD-8	Wasp	Amphibious assault ship	24 Oct 2009	San Diego, CA	
USS Manchester	LCS-14	Independence	Littoral combat ship	26 May 2018	San Diego, CA	
USS Marinette	LCS-25	Freedom	Littoral combat ship	16 Sep 2023	Mayport, FL	
USS Maryland	SSBN-738	Ohio	Ballistic missile submarine	13 Jun 1992	Kings Bay, GA	
USS Mason	DDG-87	Arleigh Burke	Destroyer	12 Apr 2003	Norfolk, VA	
USS Massachusetts	SSN-798	Virginia	Attack submarine	Mar 28, 2026	Groton, Connecticut	
USS McCampbell	DDG-85	Arleigh Burke	Destroyer	17 Aug 2002	Everett, WA	
USS McFaul	DDG-74	Arleigh Burke	Destroyer	25 Apr 1998	Norfolk, VA	
USS Mesa Verde	LPD-19	San Antonio	Amphibious transport dock	15 Dec 2007	Norfolk, VA	
USS Michael Monsoor	DDG-1001	Zumwalt	Destroyer	26 Jan 2019	San Diego, CA	
USS Michael Murphy	DDG-112	Arleigh Burke	Destroyer	5 Sep 2012	Pearl Harbor, HI	
USS Michigan	SSGN-727	Ohio	Guided missile submarine	11 Sep 1982	Bangor, WA	Scheduled to be decommissioned 2028
USS Miguel Keith	ESB-5	Lewis B. Puller	Expeditionary mobile base	8 May 2021	Sasebo, Japan	
USS Milius	DDG-69	Arleigh Burke	Destroyer	23 Nov 1996	Yokosuka, Japan	
USS Minnesota	SSN-783	Virginia	Attack submarine	7 Sep 2013	Apra Harbor, GU	
USS Minneapolis-Saint Paul	LCS-21	Freedom	Littoral combat ship	21 May 2022	Mayport, FL	
USS Mississippi	SSN-782	Virginia	Attack submarine	2 Jun 2012	Pearl Harbor, HI	
USS Missouri	SSN-780	Virginia	Attack submarine	31 Jul 2010	Pearl Harbor, HI	
USS Mitscher	DDG-57	Arleigh Burke	Destroyer	10 Dec 1994	Norfolk, VA	
USS Mobile	LCS-26	Independence	Littoral combat ship	22 May 2021	San Diego, CA	
USS Momsen	DDG-92	Arleigh Burke	Destroyer	28 Aug 2004	San Diego, CA	
USS Montana	SSN-794	Virginia	Attack submarine	25 Jun 2022	Pearl Harbor, HI	
USS Montgomery	LCS-8	Independence	Littoral combat ship	10 Sep 2016	San Diego, CA	Scheduled to be decommissioned 2025
USS Montpelier	SSN-765	Los Angeles	Attack submarine	13 Mar 1993	Norfolk, VA	
USS Mount Whitney	LCC-20	Blue Ridge	Amphibious command ship	16 Jan 1971	Gaeta, Italy	
USS Mustin	DDG-89	Arleigh Burke	Destroyer	26 Jul 2003	Yokosuka, Japan	
USS Nantucket	LCS-27	Freedom	Littoral combat ship	16 Nov 2024	Mayport, FL	
USS Nebraska	SSBN-739	Ohio	Ballistic missile submarine	10 Jul 1993	Bangor, WA	
USS Nevada	SSBN-733	Ohio	Ballistic missile submarine	16 Aug 1986	Bangor, WA	
USS New Hampshire	SSN-778	Virginia	Attack submarine	25 Oct 2008	Norfolk, VA	
USS New Jersey	SSN-796	Virginia	Attack submarine	14 Sep 2024	Norfolk, VA	
USS New Mexico	SSN-779	Virginia	Attack submarine	27 Mar 2010	Norfolk, VA	
USS New Orleans	LPD-18	San Antonio	Amphibious transport dock	5 Mar 2007	San Diego, CA	
USS New York	LPD-21	San Antonio	Amphibious transport dock	7 Nov 2009	Mayport, FL	
USS Nimitz	CVN-68	Nimitz	Aircraft carrier	3 May 1975	Bremerton, WA	Scheduled to be decommissioned 2027
USS Nitze	DDG-94	Arleigh Burke	Destroyer	5 Mar 2005	Norfolk, VA	
USS North Carolina	SSN-777	Virginia	Attack submarine	3 May 2008	Pearl Harbor, HI	
USS North Dakota	SSN-784	Virginia	Attack submarine	25 Oct 2014	Portsmouth, NH	
USS O'Kane	DDG-77	Arleigh Burke	Destroyer	23 Oct 1999	Pearl Harbor, HI	
USS Oak Hill	LSD-51	Harpers Ferry	Dock landing ship	8 Jun 1996	Little Creek, VA	Scheduled to be decommissioned 2025
USS Oakland	LCS-24	Independence	Littoral combat ship	17 Apr 2021	San Diego, CA	
USS Ohio	SSGN-726	Ohio	Guided missile submarine	11 Nov 1981	Bangor, WA	Scheduled to be decommissioned 2026
USS Omaha	LCS-12	Independence	Littoral combat ship	3 Feb 2018	San Diego, CA	
USS Oregon	SSN-793	Virginia	Attack submarine	28 May 2022	Norfolk, VA	
USS Oscar Austin	DDG-79	Arleigh Burke	Destroyer	19 Aug 2000	Norfolk, VA	
USS Pasadena	SSN-752	Los Angeles	Attack submarine	11 Feb 1989	Norfolk, VA	Scheduled to be decommissioned 2025
USS Patriot	MCM-7	Avenger	Mine countermeasures ship	18 Oct 1991	Sasebo, Japan	
USS Paul Hamilton	DDG-60	Arleigh Burke	Destroyer	27 May 1995	Pearl Harbor, HI	
USS Paul Ignatius	DDG-117	Arleigh Burke	Destroyer	27 Jul 2019	Mayport, FL	
USS Pearl Harbor	LSD-52	Harpers Ferry	Dock landing ship	27 Apr 1998	San Diego, CA	Scheduled to be decommissioned 2024
USS Pennsylvania	SSBN-735	Ohio	Ballistic missile submarine	9 Sep 1989	Bangor, WA	
USS Pierre	LCS-38	Independence	Littoral combat ship	16 Nov 2025	San Diego, CA	
USS Pinckney	DDG-91	Arleigh Burke	Destroyer	29 May 2004	San Diego, CA	
USS Pioneer	MCM-9	Avenger	Mine countermeasures ship	7 Dec 1992	Sasebo, Japan	
USS Porter	DDG-78	Arleigh Burke	Destroyer	20 Mar 1999	Rota, Spain	
USS Portland	LPD-27	San Antonio	Amphibious transport dock	14 Dec 2017	San Diego, CA	
USS Preble	DDG-88	Arleigh Burke	Destroyer	9 Nov 2002	Pearl Harbor, HI	
USS Princeton	CG-59	Ticonderoga	Cruiser	11 Feb 1989	San Diego, CA	
USS Pueblo	AGER-2	Banner	Technical research ship	7 Apr 1945	Yokosuka, Japan (at time of capture)	Captured and currently possessed by North Korea. Still actively commissioned^{A}
USS Rafael Peralta	DDG-115	Arleigh Burke	Destroyer	29 Jul 2017	San Diego, CA	
USS Ralph Johnson	DDG-114	Arleigh Burke	Destroyer	24 Mar 2018	Everett, WA	
USS Ramage	DDG-61	Arleigh Burke	Destroyer	22 Jul 1995	Norfolk, VA	
USS Rhode Island	SSBN-740	Ohio	Ballistic missile submarine	9 Jul 1994	Kings Bay, GA	
USS Richard M. McCool Jr.	LPD-29	San Antonio	Amphibious transport dock	9 Sep 2024	San Diego, CA	
USS Robert Smalls	CG-62	Ticonderoga	Cruiser	4 Nov 1989	Yokosuka, Japan	formerly USS Chancellorsville until renamed on 27 February 2023, Scheduled to be decommissioned 2026
USS Ronald Reagan	CVN-76	Nimitz	Aircraft carrier	12 Jul 2003	Bremerton, WA	
USS Roosevelt	DDG-80	Arleigh Burke	Destroyer	14 Oct 2000	Rota, Spain	
USS Ross	DDG-71	Arleigh Burke	Destroyer	28 Jun 1997	Rota, Spain	
USS Rushmore	LSD-47	Whidbey Island	Dock landing ship	1 Jun 1991	San Diego, CA	Scheduled to be decommissioned 2024
USS Russell	DDG-59	Arleigh Burke	Destroyer	20 May 1995	San Diego, CA	
USS Sampson	DDG-102	Arleigh Burke	Destroyer	3 Nov 2007	Everett, WA	
USS San Antonio	LPD-17	San Antonio	Amphibious transport dock	14 Jan 2006	Norfolk, VA	
USS San Diego	LPD-22	San Antonio	Amphibious transport dock	19 May 2012	San Diego, CA	
USS Santa Barbara	LCS-32	Independence	Littoral combat ship	1 Apr 2023	San Diego, CA	
USS Santa Fe	SSN-763	Los Angeles	Attack submarine	8 Jan 1994	San Diego, CA	
USS Savannah	LCS-28	Independence	Littoral combat ship	5 Feb 2022	San Diego, CA	
USS Scranton	SSN-756	Los Angeles	Attack submarine	26 Jan 1991	San Diego, CA	Scheduled to be decommissioned 2026
USS Seawolf	SSN-21	Seawolf	Attack submarine	19 Jul 1997	Bangor, WA	
USS Shoup	DDG-86	Arleigh Burke	Destroyer	22 Jun 2002	San Diego, CA	
USS Somerset	LPD-25	San Antonio	Amphibious transport dock	1 Mar 2014	San Diego, CA	
USS South Dakota	SSN-790	Virginia	Attack submarine	2 Feb 2019	Groton, CT	
USS Springfield	SSN-761	Los Angeles	Attack submarine	9 Jan 1993	Apra Harbor, GU	
USS Spruance	DDG-111	Arleigh Burke	Destroyer	1 Sep 2011	San Diego, CA	
USS St. Louis	LCS-19	Freedom	Littoral combat ship	8 Aug 2020	Mayport, FL	Proposed to be decommissioned 2023
USS Sterett	DDG-104	Arleigh Burke	Destroyer	9 Aug 2008	San Diego, CA	
USS Stethem	DDG-63	Arleigh Burke	Destroyer	21 Oct 1995	Yokosuka, Japan	
USS Stockdale	DDG-106	Arleigh Burke	Destroyer	18 Apr 2009	San Diego, CA	
USS Stout	DDG-55	Arleigh Burke	Destroyer	13 Aug 1994	Norfolk, VA	
USS Tennessee	SSBN-734	Ohio	Ballistic missile submarine	17 Dec 1988	Kings Bay, GA	
USS Texas	SSN-775	Virginia	Attack submarine	9 Sep 2006	Groton, CT	
USS Ted Stevens	DDG-128	Arleigh Burke	Destroyer	3 Oct 2026	Norfolk, VA	
USS The Sullivans	DDG-68	Arleigh Burke	Destroyer	19 Apr 1997	Mayport, FL	
USS Theodore Roosevelt	CVN-71	Nimitz	Aircraft carrier	25 Oct 1986	San Diego, CA	
USS Thomas Hudner	DDG-116	Arleigh Burke	Destroyer	1 Dec 2018	Mayport, FL	
USS Toledo	SSN-769	Los Angeles	Attack submarine	24 Feb 1995	Pearl Harbor, HI	
USS Tortuga	LSD-46	Whidbey Island	Dock landing ship	17 Nov 1990	Little Creek, VA	Proposed to be decommissioned 2023
USS Tripoli	LHA-7	America	Amphibious assault ship	15 Jul 2020	San Diego, CA	
USS Truxtun	DDG-103	Arleigh Burke	Destroyer	25 Apr 2009	Norfolk, VA	
USS Tucson	SSN-770	Los Angeles	Attack submarine	18 Aug 1995	Pearl Harbor, HI	
USS Tulsa	LCS-16	Independence	Littoral combat ship	16 Feb 2019	San Diego, CA	
USS Vermont	SSN-792	Virginia	Attack submarine	18 Apr 2020	Pearl Harbor, HI	
USS Virginia	SSN-774	Virginia	Attack submarine	23 Oct 2004	Groton, CT	
USS Warrior	MCM-10	Avenger	Mine countermeasures ship	7 Apr 1993	Sasebo, Japan	
USS Washington	SSN-787	Virginia	Attack submarine	7 Oct 2017	Portsmouth, NH	
USS Wasp	LHD-1	Wasp	Amphibious assault ship	6 Jul 1989	Norfolk, VA	
USS Wayne E. Meyer	DDG-108	Arleigh Burke	Destroyer	10 Oct 2009	San Diego, CA	
USS West Virginia	SSBN-736	Ohio	Ballistic missile submarine	20 Oct 1990	Kings Bay, GA	
USS William P. Lawrence	DDG-110	Arleigh Burke	Destroyer	19 May 2011	San Diego, CA	
USS Winston S. Churchill	DDG-81	Arleigh Burke	Destroyer	10 Mar 2001	Mayport, FL	
USS Wichita	LCS-13	Freedom	Littoral combat ship	12 Jan 2019	Mayport, FL	
USS Wyoming	SSBN-742	Ohio	Ballistic missile submarine	13 Jul 1996	Kings Bay, GA	
USS Zumwalt	DDG-1000	Zumwalt	Destroyer	15 Oct 2016	San Diego, CA	

Note

^{A} Both USS Constitution and USS Pueblo are commissioned vessels, but are not considered part of the active combat fleet.

=== Non-commissioned ===
Ship name	Hull number	Class	Type	Note
USNS 1st Lt. Jack Lummus	T-AK-3011	2nd Lt. John P. Bobo	Maritime prepositioning ship	
USNS Able	T-AGOS-20	Victorious	Ocean surveillance ship	
USNS Alan Shepard	T-AKE-3	Lewis and Clark	Dry cargo ship	
USNS Amelia Earhart	T-AKE-6	Lewis and Clark	Dry cargo ship	
USNS Apalachicola	T-EPF-13	Spearhead	Expeditionary fast transport	
USNS Arctic	T-AOE-8	Supply	Fast combat support ship	
USNS Arrowhead	T-AGSE-4	Black Powder	S.A.S.W.S Vessel ^{A}	
USNS Black Powder	T-AGSE-1	Black Powder	S.A.S.W.S Vessel ^{A}	
USNS Bowditch	T-AGS-62	Pathfinder	Survey ship	
USNS Bruce C. Heezen	T-AGS-64	Pathfinder	Survey ship	
USNS Brunswick	T-EPF-6	Spearhead	Expeditionary fast transport	
USNS Burlington	T-EPF-10	Spearhead	Expeditionary fast transport	
USNS Carl Brashear	T-AKE-7	Lewis and Clark	Dry cargo ship	
USNS Carson City	T-EPF-7	Spearhead	Expeditionary fast transport	
USNS Catawba	T-ATF-168	Powhatan	Fleet ocean tug	Scheduled end of service 2023
USNS Cesar Chavez	T-AKE-14	Lewis and Clark	Dry cargo ship	
USNS Charles Drew	T-AKE-10	Lewis and Clark	Dry cargo ship	
USNS City of Bismarck	T-EPF-9	Spearhead	Expeditionary fast transport	
USNS Cody	T-EPF-14	Spearhead	Expeditionary fast transport	
USNS Comfort	T-AH-20	Mercy	Hospital ship	
USNS Dahl	T-AKR-312	Watson	Vehicle cargo ship	
USNS Eagleview	T-AGSE-3	Black Powder	S.A.S.W.S Vessel ^{A}	
USNS Earl Warren	T-AO-207	John Lewis	Replenishment oiler	
USNS Effective	T-AGOS-21	Victorious	Ocean surveillance ship	
USNS Fast Tempo	—	Fast Tempo	Offshore supply vessel	Support vessel for USNS VADM K.R. Wheeler
USNS Grasp	T-ARS-51	Safeguard	Salvage ship	Scheduled end of service 2023
USNS Guadalupe	T-AO-200	Henry J. Kaiser	Replenishment oiler	
USNS Guam	T-HST-1	Guam	High speed transport	
USNS Henry J. Kaiser	T-AO-187	Henry J. Kaiser	Replenishment oiler	
USNS Henson	T-AGS-63	Pathfinder	Survey ship	
USNS Howard O. Lorenzen	T-AGM-25	Howard O. Lorenzen	Instrumentation ship	
USNS Impeccable	T-AGOS-23	Impeccable	Ocean surveillance ship	
USNS John Glenn	T-ESD-2	Montford Point	Expeditionary transfer dock	Inactive, Reduced Operating Status Scheduled end of service 2025
USNS John Lenthall	T-AO-189	Henry J. Kaiser	Replenishment oiler	Scheduled end of service 2023
USNS John Lewis	T-AO-205	John Lewis	Replenishment oiler	
USNS Joshua Humphreys	T-AO-188	Henry J. Kaiser	Replenishment oiler	Scheduled end of service 2025
USNS Kanawha	T-AO-196	Henry J. Kaiser	Replenishment oiler	
USNS Laramie	T-AO-203	Henry J. Kaiser	Replenishment oiler	
USNS Leroy Grumman	T-AO-195	Henry J. Kaiser	Replenishment oiler	
USNS Lewis and Clark	T-AKE-1	Lewis and Clark	Dry cargo ship	
USNS Loyal	T-AGOS-22	Victorious	Ocean surveillance ship	
USNS Lucy Stone	T-AO-209	John Lewis	Replenishment oiler	
USNS Marie Tharp	T-AGS-66	Pathfinder	Survey ship	formerly USNS Maury until renamed on 8 March 2023
USNS Mary Sears	T-AGS-65	Pathfinder	Survey ship	
USNS Matthew Perry	T-AKE-9	Lewis and Clark	Dry cargo ship	
USNS Medgar Evers	T-AKE-13	Lewis and Clark	Dry cargo ship	
USNS Mercy	T-AH-19	Mercy	Hospital ship	
USNS Montford Point	T-ESD-1	Montford Point	Expeditionary transfer dock	Inactive, Reduced Operating Status Proposed end of service 2023
USNS Newport	T-EPF-12	Spearhead	Expeditionary fast transport	
USNS Oscar V. Peterson	T-AO-206	John Lewis	Replenishment oiler	formerly named USNS Harvey Milk
USNS Pathfinder	T-AGS-60	Pathfinder	Survey ship	
USNS Patuxent	T-AO-201	Henry J. Kaiser	Replenishment oiler	
USNS PFC Dewayne T. Williams	T-AK-3009	2nd Lt. John P. Bobo	Maritime prepositioning ship	
USNS Pililaau	T-AKR-304	Bob Hope	Vehicle cargo ship	
USNS Point Loma	T-EPF-15	Spearhead	Expeditionary fast transport	
USNS Puerto Rico	T-EPF-11	Spearhead	Expeditionary fast transport	
USNS Rappahannock	T-AO-204	Henry J. Kaiser	Replenishment oiler	
USNS Red Cloud	T-AKR-313	Watson	Vehicle cargo ship	Scheduled end of service 2026
USNS Richard E. Byrd	T-AKE-4	Lewis and Clark	Dry cargo ship	
USNS Robert E. Peary	T-AKE-5	Lewis and Clark	Dry cargo ship	
USNS Robert F. Kennedy	T-AO-208	John Lewis	Replenishment oiler	
USNS Sacagawea	T-AKE-2	Lewis and Clark	Dry cargo ship	
USNS Salvor	T-ARS-52	Safeguard	Salvage ship	Scheduled end of service 2024
USNS Seay	T-AKR-302	Bob Hope	Vehicle cargo ship	
USNS Sgt. William R. Button	T-AK-3012	2nd Lt. John P. Bobo	Maritime prepositioning ship	
USNS Sisler	T-AKR-311	Watson	Vehicle cargo ship	
USNS Soderman	T-AKR-317	Watson	Vehicle cargo ship	
USNS Sojourner Truth	T-AO-210	John Lewis	Replenishment oiler	
USNS Supply	T-AOE-6	Supply	Fast combat support ship	
USNS Tippecanoe	T-AO-199	Henry J. Kaiser	Replenishment oiler	
USNS Trenton	T-EPF-5	Spearhead	Expeditionary fast transport	
USNS VADM K.R. Wheeler	T-AG-5001	VADM K.R. Wheeler	Maritime prepositioning ship	Scheduled end of service 2026
USNS Victorious	T-AGOS-19	Victorious	Ocean surveillance ship	Scheduled end of service 2026
USNS Wally Schirra	T-AKE-8	Lewis and Clark	Dry cargo ship	
USNS Washington Chambers	T-AKE-11	Lewis and Clark	Dry cargo ship	
USNS Waters	T-AGS-45	Waters	Survey ship	
USNS Watkins	T-AKR-315	Watson	Vehicle cargo ship	Scheduled end of service 2026
USNS Westwind	T-AGSE-2	Black Powder	S.A.S.W.S Vessel ^{A}	
USNS William McLean	T-AKE-12	Lewis and Clark	Dry cargo ship	
USNS Yuma	T-EPF-8	Spearhead	Expeditionary fast transport	
USNS Yukon	T-AO-202	Henry J. Kaiser	Replenishment oiler	
USNS Zeus	T-ARC-7	Zeus	Cable ship	
Unnamed (ex-Puerto Rico)	HST-2	Puerto Rico	High speed transport	chartered by Bay Ferries

^{A}Submarine and special warfare support vessel

=== Support ===
Ship name	Hull number	Class	Type	Note
APL-2	APL-2	APL-2	Barracks ship	
APL-4	APL-4	APL-2	Barracks ship	
APL-5	APL-5	APL-2	Barracks ship	
APL-15	APL-15	APL-2	Barracks ship	
APL-18	APL-18	APL-17	Barracks ship	
APL-29	APL-29	APL-17	Barracks ship	
APL-32	APL-32	APL-17	Barracks ship	
APL-42	APL-42	APL-41	Barracks ship	
APL-45	APL-45	APL-41	Barracks ship	
APL-50	APL-50	APL-41	Barracks ship	
APL-58	APL-58	APL-53	Barracks ship	
APL-61	APL-61	APL-61	Barracks ship	
APL-62	APL-62	APL-61	Barracks ship	
APL-65	APL-65	APL-65	Barracks ship	
APL-66	APL-66	APL-65	Barracks ship	
APL-67	APL-67	APL-67	Barracks ship	
APL-68	APL-68	APL-67	Barracks ship	
APL-69	APL-69	APL-67	Barracks ship	
APL-70	APL-70	APL-67	Barracks ship	
APL-71	APL-71	APL-67	Barracks ship	
Agamenticus	YT-809	Rainier	Harbor tug	
Arco	ARDM-5	ARDM-5	Dry dock	
RV Atlantis	AGOR-25	Thomas G. Thompson	Oceanographic research ship	Leased to Woods Hole Oceanographic Institution
Baker	YT-812	Rainier	Harbor tug	
Battle Point	YTT-10	Cape Flattery	Torpedo trials craft	
MV C Ocean Trader	—	C Ocean Trader	S.A.S.W.S Vessel ^{A}	
MV Capt. David I. Lyon	T-AK-5362	Capt. David I. Lyon	Container ship	
Deception	YT-810	Rainier	Harbor tug	
Defiant	YT-804	Valiant	Harbor tug	
Dekanawida	YTB-831	Natick	Large harbor tug	
Discovery Bay	YTT-11	Cape Flattery	Torpedo trials craft	
MT Empire State	T-AOT-5193	Empire State	Fuel tanker	
MT Evergreen State	—	Empire State	Fuel tanker	
MV HOS Dominator	—	HOS Dominator	S.A.S.W.S Vessel ^{A}	
MV Kellie Chouest	—	Kellie Chouest	S.A.S.W.S Vessel ^{A}	
RV Kilo Moana	T-AGOR-26	Kilo Moana	Oceanographic research ship	
MV Maj. Bernard F. Fisher	T-AK-4396	LTC Calvin P. Titus	Container ship	
MV Malama	—	Malama	S.A.S.W.S Vessel ^{A}	
Menominee	YT-807	Valiant	Harbor tug	
RV Neil Armstrong	T-AGOR-27	Neil Armstrong	Oceanographic research ship	
Nueces	APL-40	Benewah	Barracks ship	
Olympus	YT-811	Rainier	Harbor tug	
Ex-Paul F. Foster	EDD-964	Spruance	Self Defense Test Ship	
Prevail	IX-537	Stalwart	Unclassified miscellaneous	
Puyallup	YT-806	Valiant	Harbor tug	
Rainier	YT-808	Rainier	Harbor tug	
Reliant	YT-803	Valiant	Harbor tug	
RV Roger Revelle	AGOR-24	Thomas G. Thompson	Oceanographic research ship	Chartered to Scripps Institution of Oceanography
RV Sally Ride	T-AGOR-28	Neil Armstrong	Oceanographic research ship	
Santaquin	YTB-824	Natick	Large harbor tug	
Sea-based X-band Radar	SBX-1	SBX-1	Sea-based X-band Radar	
Seminole	YT-805	Valiant	Harbor tug	
Sentinel	YT-813	Rainier	Harbor tug	
Shippingport	ARDM-4	ARDM-4	Dry dock	
MT SLNC Corsica	T-AK-5423	SLNC Corsica	Container ship	
MT SLNC Goodwill	T-AOT-5419	SLNC Goodwill	Fuel tanker	
MT SLNC Pax	T-AOT-5356	SLNC Pax	Fuel tanker	
MV SSG Edward A. Carter Jr.	T-AK-4544	SSG Edward A. Carter Jr.	Container ship	
MT Stena Polaris	T-AOT-5563	Stena Polaris	Fuel tanker	
RV Thomas G. Thompson	T-AGOR-23	Thomas G. Thompson	Oceanographic research ship	Chartered to University of Washington (UNOLS)
Unnamed ex-Manhattan	YT-800 ex-(YTB-779)	Natick	Large harbor tug	
Unnamed ex-Washtucna	YT-801 ex-(YTB-826)	Natick	Large harbor tug	
Valiant	YT-802	Valiant	Harbor tug	
Wanamassa	YTB-820	Natick	Large harbor tug	

^{A}Submarine and Special Warfare Support Vessel

=== Ready Reserve Force ships ===
Ready Reserve Force ships are maintained by the United States Maritime Administration and are part of the United States Navy ship inventory. If activated, these ships would be operated by Military Sealift Command.

Ship name	Hull number	Class	Type	Note
GTS Admiral W. M. Callaghan	T-AKR-1001	Cape O	Vehicle cargo ship	
SS Algol	T-AKR-287	Algol	Vehicle cargo ship	
SS Altair	T-AKR-291	Algol	Vehicle cargo ship	
SS Antares	T-AKR-294	Algol	Vehicle cargo ship	
SS Bellatrix	T-AKR-288	Algol	Vehicle cargo ship	
MV Bob Hope	T-AKR-300	Bob Hope	Vehicle cargo ship	
MV Cape Arundel	T-AKR-1214	Cape Arundel	Vehicle cargo ship	
MV Cape Cortes	T-AKR-1215	Cape Arundel	Vehicle cargo ship	
MV Cape Decision	T-AKR-5054	Cape Ducato	Vehicle cargo ship	
MV Cape Diamond	T-AKR-5055	Cape Ducato	Vehicle cargo ship	
MV Cape Domingo	T-AKR-5053	Cape Ducato	Vehicle cargo ship	
MV Cape Douglas	T-AKR-5052	Cape Ducato	Vehicle cargo ship	
MV Cape Ducato	T-AKR-5051	Cape Ducato	Vehicle cargo ship	
MV Cape Edmont	AKR-5069	Cape E	Vehicle cargo ship	
MV Cape Henry	AKR-5067	Cape H	Vehicle cargo ship	
MV Cape Horn	AKR-5068	Cape H	Vehicle cargo ship	
MV Cape Hudson	AKR-5066	Cape H	Vehicle cargo ship	
SS Cape Inscription	T-AKR-5076	Cape I	Vehicle cargo ship	
SS Cape Intrepid	T-AKR-11	Cape Island	Vehicle cargo ship	
SS Cape Isabel	T-AKR-5062	Cape I	Vehicle cargo ship	
SS Cape Island	T-AKR-10	Cape Island	Vehicle cargo ship	
MV Cape Kennedy	T-AKR-5083	Cape K	Vehicle cargo ship	
MV Cape Knox	T-AKR-5082	Cape K	Vehicle cargo ship	
MV Cape Orlando	T-AKR-2044	Cape O	Vehicle cargo ship	
MV Cape Race	T-AKR-9960	Cape R	Vehicle cargo ship	
MV Cape Ray	T-AKR-9679	Cape R	Vehicle cargo ship	
MV Cape Rise	T-AKR-9678	Cape R	Vehicle cargo ship	
MV Cape Sable	T-AKR-5586	Cape S	Vehicle cargo ship	
MV Cape San Juan	T-AKR-5587	Cape S	Vehicle cargo ship	
MV Cape Starr	T-AKR-5588	Cape S	Vehicle cargo ship	
MV Cape Taylor	T-AKR-113	Cape T	Vehicle cargo ship	
MV Cape Texas	T-AKR-112	Cape T	Vehicle cargo ship	
MV Cape Trinity	T-AKR-9711	Cape T	Vehicle cargo ship	
MV Cape Victory	T-AKR-9701	Cape V	Vehicle cargo ship	
MV Cape Vincent	T-AKR-9666	Cape V	Vehicle cargo ship	
MV Cape Washington	AKR-9961	Cape W	Vehicle cargo ship	
MV Cape Wrath	T-AKR-9962	Cape W	Vehicle cargo ship	
SS Capella	T-AKR-293	Algol	Vehicle cargo ship	
MV Charles L. Gilliland	T-AKR-298	Gordon	Vehicle cargo ship	
MV Cornelius H. Charlton	T-AKR-314	Watson	Vehicle cargo ship	
SS Cornhusker State	T-ACS-6	Gopher State	Crane ship	
SS Curtiss	T-AVB-4	Wright	Aviation logistics support ship	
SS Denebola	T-AKR-289	Algol	Vehicle cargo ship	
MV Fisher	T-AKR-301	Bob Hope	Vehicle cargo ship	
MV Gary I. Gordon	T-AKR-296	Gordon	Vehicle cargo ship	
SS Gem State	T-ACS-2	Keystone State	Crane ship	
MV George Watson	T-AKR-310	Watson	Vehicle cargo ship	
USNS Pomeroy	T-AKR-316	Watson	Vehicle cargo ship	
SS Gopher State	T-ACS-4	Gopher State	Crane ship	
SS Keystone State	T-ACS-1	Keystone State	Crane ship	
MV Leroy A. Mendonca	T-AKR-303	Bob Hope	Vehicle cargo ship	
MV Nelson V. Brittin	T-AKR-305	Bob Hope	Vehicle cargo ship	
SS Pollux	T-AKR-290	Algol	Vehicle cargo ship	
SS Regulus	T-AKR-292	Algol	Vehicle cargo ship	
MV Roy P. Benavidez	T-AKR-306	Bob Hope	Vehicle cargo ship	
SS Wright	T-AVB-3	Wright	Aviation logistics support ship	

=== Reserve fleet ===
Ship name	Hull number	Class	Type	Berth	Note
Anzio	CG-68	Ticonderoga	Cruiser	Philadelphia, PA	Decommissioned on 22 September 2022, and placed in reserve
Antietam	CG-54	Ticonderoga	Cruiser	Pearl Harbor, HI	Decommissioned 27 September 2024, and placed in reserve
Big Horn	T-AO-198	Henry J. Kaiser	Replenishment oiler		Inactivated in 2026
Bunker Hill	CG-52	Ticonderoga	Cruiser	Bremerton, WA	Decommissioned on 22 September 2023, awaiting disposition
Choctaw County	T-EPF-2	Spearhead	Expeditionary fast transport		Inactivated in 2025
Coronado	LCS-4	Independence	Littoral combat ship	Bremerton, WA	Decommissioned on 14 September 2022, and placed in reserve
Cowpens	CG-63	Ticonderoga	Cruiser	Pearl Harbor, HI	Decommissioned 28 August 2024, and placed in reserve
Detroit	LCS-7	Freedom	Littoral combat ship	Philadelphia, PA	Decommissioned 29 September 2023, on hold for potential foreign military sale
Grapple	T-ARS-53	Safeguard	Salvage ship	Philadelphia, PA	
Hué City	CG-66	Ticonderoga	Cruiser	Philadelphia, PA	Decommissioned on 23 September 2022, and placed in reserve
Invincible	T-AGM-24	Stalwart	Instrumentation ship		Inactivated in 2021
Lake Champlain	CG-57	Ticonderoga	Cruiser	Bremerton, WA	Decommissioned on 1 September 2023, and placed in reserve
Lake Erie	CG-70	Ticonderoga	Cruiser	Bremerton, WA	Decommissioned on 25 September 2026 and placed in reserve
Leyte Gulf	CG-55	Ticonderoga	Cruiser	Philadelphia, PA	Decommissioned on 20 September 2024 and placed in reserve
Little Rock	LCS-9	Freedom	Littoral combat ship	Philadelphia, PA	Decommissioned 29 September 2023, on hold for potential foreign military sale
Millinocket	T-EPF-3	Spearhead	Expeditionary fast transport		Inactivated in 2025
Milwaukee	LCS-5	Freedom	Littoral combat ship		Decommissioned on 8 September 2023, and awaiting transfer to reserve fleet
Monterey	CG-61	Ticonderoga	Cruiser	Philadelphia, PA	Decommissioned on 16 September 2022, and placed in reserve
Normandy	CG-60	Ticonderoga	Cruiser	Philadelphia, PA	Decommissioned on 25 September 2025, and placed in reserve
Philippine Sea	CG-58	Ticonderoga	Cruiser	Philadelphia, PA	Decommissioned on 25 September 2025, and placed in reserve
Port Royal	CG-73	Ticonderoga	Cruiser	Pearl Harbor, HI	Decommissioned on 29 September 2022, and placed in reserve
Resolute	AFDM-10	AFDM-3	Dry dock	Bremerton, WA	Inactive, currently leased to Todd Pacific
Safeguard	T-ARS-50	Safeguard	Salvage ship	Pearl Harbor, HI	
San Jacinto	CG-56	Ticonderoga	Cruiser	Philadelphia, PA	Decommissioned on 15 September 2023, and placed in reserve
Sioux City	LCS-11	Freedom	Littoral combat ship		Decommissioned on 14 August 2023, and placed in reserve
Shiloh	CG-67	Ticonderoga	Cruiser	Bremerton, WA	Decommissioned on 30 September 2026, placed in reserve
Vella Gulf	CG-72	Ticonderoga	Cruiser	Philadelphia, PA	Decommissioned on 4 August 2022, and placed in reserve
Vicksburg	CG-69	Ticonderoga	Cruiser	Philadelphia, PA	Decommissioned on 28 June 2024, and placed in reserve

== Future ships ==
=== Under construction ===
Note: Ships listed here may be referred to as "pre-commissioning unit" or "PCU" in various sources including US Navy webpages. While 'PCU' might be used informally as a prefix in some sources, it is not an official ship prefix. Ships listed here may be delivered to United States Navy but are not actively commissioned

Ship name	Hull number	Class	Type	Builder	Keel date	Launch date	Note
Arizona	SSN-803	Virginia	Attack submarine	General Dynamics Electric Boat	7 December 2022		
Arkansas	SSN-800	Virginia	Attack submarine	Newport News Shipbuilding	19 November 2022	7 December 2024	
Barb	SSN-804	Virginia	Attack submarine	Newport News Shipbuilding	9 December 2025		
Billy Frank Jr.	T-ATS-11	Navajo	Towing, salvage and rescue ship	Austal USA	14 November 2023	28 April 2025	
Bougainville	LHA-8	America	Amphibious assault ship	Ingalls Shipbuilding	14 March 2019	30 September 2023	
Cherokee Nation	T-ATS-7	Navajo	Towing, salvage and rescue ship	Bollinger Shipyards	12 February 2020	9 June 2024	
Constellation	FFG-62	Constellation	Frigate	Fincantieri Marinette Marine	12 April 2024		
District of Columbia	SSBN-826	Columbia	Ballistic missile submarine	General Dynamics Electric Boat	4 June 2022		
Doris Miller	CVN-81	Gerald R. Ford	Aircraft carrier	Newport News Shipbuilding			
Enterprise	CVN-80	Gerald R. Ford	Aircraft carrier	Newport News Shipbuilding	5 April 2022		
Fallujah	LHA-9	America	Amphibious assault ship	Ingalls Shipbuilding	21 September 2023		
George M. Neal	DDG-131	Arleigh Burke	Destroyer	Ingalls Shipbuilding	15 December 2023	1 April 2026	
Harrisburg	LPD-30	San Antonio	Amphibious transport dock	Ingalls Shipbuilding	28 January 2022	5 October 2024	
Hector A. Cafferata Jr.	ESB-8	Montford Point	Expeditionary mobile base	NASSCO	25 April 2024		
Jeremiah Denton	DDG-129	Arleigh Burke	Destroyer	Ingalls Shipbuilding	16 August 2022	25 March 2025	
John E. Kilmer	DDG-134	Arleigh Burke	Destroyer	Bath Iron Works	10 September 2026		
John F. Kennedy	CVN-79	Gerald R. Ford	Aircraft carrier	Newport News Shipbuilding	22 August 2015	29 October 2019	
Lansing	T-EPF-16	Spearhead	Expeditionary fast transport	Austal USA	6 September 2024	25 February 2026	
Lenni Lenape	T-ATS-9	Navajo	Towing, salvage and rescue ship	Bollinger Shipyards	16 October 2025		
Louis H. Wilson Jr.	DDG-126	Arleigh Burke	Destroyer	Bath Iron Works	16 May 2023		
Lyndon B. Johnson	DDG-1002	Zumwalt	Destroyer	Bath Iron Works	30 January 2017	9 December 2018	
Muscogee Creek Nation	T-ATS-10	Navajo	Towing, salvage and rescue ship	Bollinger Shipyards	20 March 2024		
Navajo	T-ATS-6	Navajo	Towing, salvage and rescue ship	Bollinger Shipyards	30 October 2019	24 May 2023	
Oklahoma	SSN-802	Virginia	Attack submarine	Newport News Shipbuilding	2 August 2023		
Patrick Gallagher	DDG-127	Arleigh Burke	Destroyer	Bath Iron Works	30 March 2022	3 December 2023	
Pittsburgh	LPD-31	San Antonio	Amphibious transport dock	Ingalls Shipbuilding	2 June 2023		
Philadelphia	LPD-32	San Antonio	Amphibious transport dock	Ingalls Shipbuilding	10 November 2025		
Quentin Walsh	DDG-132	Arleigh Burke	Destroyer	Bath Iron Works	20 May 2025		
Robert Ballard	T-AGS-67	Pathfinder	Survey ship	Bollinger Shipyards	14 August 2020	22 April 2026	
Robert E. Simanek	ESB-7	Montford Point	Expeditionary mobile base	NASSCO	21 October 2022		
Ruth Bader Ginsburg	T-AO-212	John Lewis	Replenishment oiler	NASSCO	13 February 2026		
Saginaw Ojibwe Anishinabek	T-ATS-8	Navajo	Towing, salvage and rescue ship	Gulf Island Fabrication	3 October 2022		
Sam Nunn	DDG-133	Arleigh Burke	Destroyer	Ingalls Shipbuilding	22 November 2024		
Silversides	SSN-807	Virginia	Attack submarine	Newport News Shipbuilding			
Solomon Atkinson	T-ATS-12	Navajo	Towing, salvage and rescue ship	Austal USA	16 April 2025	23 February 2026	
Tang	SSN-805	Virginia	Attack submarine	General Dynamics Electric Boat	17 August 2023		
Thad Cochran	DDG-135	Arleigh Burke	Destroyer	Ingalls Shipbuilding	23 October 2025		
Thurgood Marshall	T-AO-211	John Lewis	Replenishment oiler	NASSCO	5 December 2024	18 April 2026	
Utah	SSN-801	Virginia	Attack submarine	General Dynamics Electric Boat	1 September 2021		
Wahoo	SSN-806	Virginia	Attack submarine	Newport News Shipbuilding			
William Charette	DDG-130	Arleigh Burke	Destroyer	Bath Iron Works	30 August 2024		
Wisconsin	SSBN-827	Columbia	Ballistic missile submarine	General Dynamics Electric Boat	27 August 2025		

=== On order ===
The following ships have been ordered but have not yet had their keel laid down, and therefore have not reached 'under construction' status.

Ship name	Hull number	Class	Type	Builder	Note
APL-72	APL-72	APL-67	Barracks ship		
Atlanta	SSN-813	Virginia	Attack submarine	General Dynamics Electric Boat	
Balboa	T-EMS-2	Bethesda	Expeditionary medical ship		
Baltimore	SSN-812	Virginia	Attack submarine	General Dynamics Electric Boat	
Bethesda	T-EMS-1	Bethesda	Expeditionary medical ship		
Brooklyn	SSN-816	Virginia	Attack submarine		
Charles J. French	DDG-142	Arleigh Burke	Destroyer		
Congress	FFG-63	Constellation	Frigate	Fincantieri Marinette Marine	
Dolores Huerta	T-AO-214	John Lewis	Replenishment oiler	NASSCO	
Don Walsh	T-AGOS-25	Explorer	Ocean surveillance ship	Austal USA	
Ernest E. Evans	DDG-141	Arleigh Burke	Destroyer	Ingalls Shipbuilding	
George W. Bush	CVN-83	Gerald R. Ford	Aircraft carrier	Newport News Shipbuilding	
Groton	SSBN-828	Columbia	Ballistic missile submarine	General Dynamics Electric Boat	
Helmand Province	LHA-10	America	Amphibious assault ship		
Intrepid	DDG-145	Arleigh Burke	Destroyer	Ingalls Shipbuilding	
J. William Middendorf	DDG-138	Arleigh Burke	Destroyer	Bath Iron Works	
James D. Fairbanks	T-ATS-13	Navajo	Towing, salvage and rescue ship	Austal USA	
John F. Lehman	DDG-137	Arleigh Burke	Destroyer	Ingalls Shipbuilding	
John H. Dalton	SSN-808	Virginia	Attack submarine		
Joshua L. Goldberg	T-AO-215	John Lewis	Replenishment oiler	NASSCO	
Kyle Carpenter	DDG-148	Arleigh Burke	Destroyer	Bath Iron Works	
Long Island	SSN-809	Virginia	Attack submarine	Newport News Shipbuilding	
McClung	LSM-1	McClung	Medium landing ship	Bollinger Shipyards	
Miami	SSN-811	Virginia	Attack submarine	Newport News Shipbuilding	
Michael G. Mullen	DDG-144	Arleigh Burke	Destroyer	Bath Iron Works	
Narragansett	T-ATS-14	Navajo	Towing, salvage and rescue ship	Austal USA	
Norfolk	SSN-815	Virginia	Attack submarine		
Portsmouth	T-EMS-3	Bethesda	Expeditionary medical ship		
Potomac	SSN-814	Virginia	Attack submarine		
Ray Mabus	DDG-147	Arleigh Burke	Destroyer	Ingalls Shipbuilding	
Richard G. Lugar	DDG-136	Arleigh Burke	Destroyer	Bath Iron Works	
Richard J. Danzig	DDG-143	Arleigh Burke	Destroyer	Ingalls Shipbuilding	
Robert Kerrey	DDG-146	Arleigh Burke	Destroyer	Ingalls Shipbuilding	
Robert R. Ingram	DDG-149	Arleigh Burke	Destroyer	Ingalls Shipbuilding	
San Francisco	SSN-810	Virginia	Attack submarine	General Dynamics Electric Boat	
Telesforo Trinidad	DDG-139	Arleigh Burke	Destroyer	Ingalls Shipbuilding	
Thomas D. Parham	T-AO-216	John Lewis	Replenishment oiler	NASSCO	
Thomas G. Kelley	DDG-140	Arleigh Burke	Destroyer	Bath Iron Works	
Travis Manion	LPD-33	San Antonio	Amphibious transport dock	Ingalls Shipbuilding	
Victor Vescovo	T-AGOS-26	Explorer	Ocean surveillance ship	Austal USA	
William J. Clinton	CVN-82	Gerald R. Ford	Aircraft carrier	Newport News Shipbuilding	
Unnamed	T-ATS-15	Navajo	Towing, salvage and rescue ship	Austal USA	

== Fleet totals ==
Commissioned (USS) – 230

- Aircraft carrier – 11
- Amphibious assault ship – 9
- Amphibious command ship – 2
- Amphibious transport dock – 13
- Attack submarine – 47
- Ballistic missile submarine – 14
- Classic frigate – 1
- Cruiser – 5 (of 21)
- Destroyer – 78
- Dock landing ship – 9
- Expeditionary mobile base – 4
- Guided missile submarine – 3
- Littoral combat ship – 27 (of 32)
- Mine countermeasures ship – 4
- Submarine tender – 2
- Technical research ship – 1

Non-commissioned (USNS) – 83

- Cable ship – 1
- Dry cargo ship – 14
- Expeditionary fast transport – 11
- Expeditionary transfer dock – 2
- Fast combat support ship – 2
- Fleet ocean tug – 1
- High speed transport – 2
- Hospital ship – 2
- Instrumentation ship – 1 (of 2)
- Maritime prepositioning ship – 4
- Ocean surveillance ship – 5
- Offshore supply vessel – 1
- Replenishment oiler – 17 (of 18)
- S.A.S.W.S Vessel ^{A} – 4
- Salvage ship – 2 (of 4)
- Survey ship – 7
- Vehicle cargo ship – 7 (of 57)

Support (MV, RV – or no prefix) – 64

- Barracks ship – 21
- Container ship – 4
- Dry dock – 2
- Fuel tanker – 5
- Harbor tug – 12
- Large harbor tug – 5
- Oceanographic research ship – 6
- S.A.S.W.S Vessel ^{A} – 4
- Sea-based X-band Radar – 1
- Self Defense Test Ship – 1
- Torpedo trials craft – 2
- Unclassified miscellaneous – 1

Ready Reserve Force ships (MV, SS, GTS) – 56

- Aviation logistics support ship – 2
- Crane ship – 4
- Vehicle cargo ship – 50 (of 57)

Reserve Fleet ships (USS, USNS) – 28

- Cruiser – 16 (of 21)
- Dry dock – 1
- Expeditionary fast transport – 2
- Instrumentation ship – 1 (of 2)
- Littoral combat ship – 5 (of 32)
- Replenishment oiler – 1 (of 18)
- Salvage ship – 2 (of 4)

Under construction – 42

- Aircraft carrier – 3
- Amphibious assault ship – 2
- Amphibious transport dock – 3
- Attack submarine – 8
- Ballistic missile submarine – 2
- Destroyer – 10
- Expeditionary fast transport – 1
- Expeditionary mobile base – 2
- Frigate – 1
- Replenishment oiler – 2
- Survey ship – 1
- Towing, salvage and rescue ship – 7

On order – 42

- Aircraft carrier – 2
- Amphibious assault ship – 1
- Amphibious transport dock – 1
- Attack submarine – 9
- Ballistic missile submarine – 1
- Barracks ship – 1
- Destroyer – 14
- Expeditionary medical ship – 3
- Frigate – 1
- Medium landing ship – 1
- Ocean surveillance ship – 2
- Replenishment oiler – 3
- Towing, salvage and rescue ship – 3

Expected to retire – 32

- Aircraft carrier (2027) – 1
- Attack submarine (2025) – 1
- Attack submarine (2026) – 1
- Cruiser (2026) – 1
- Dock landing ship (2023) – 3
- Dock landing ship (2024) – 4
- Dock landing ship (2025) – 1
- Dock landing ship (2026) – 1
- Expeditionary transfer dock (2023) – 1
- Expeditionary transfer dock (2025) – 1
- Fleet ocean tug (2023) – 1
- Guided missile submarine (2026) – 2
- Guided missile submarine (2028) – 1
- Littoral combat ship (2023) – 3
- Littoral combat ship (2025) – 2
- Maritime prepositioning ship (2026) – 1
- Ocean surveillance ship (2026) – 1
- Replenishment oiler (2023) – 1
- Replenishment oiler (2025) – 1
- Salvage ship (2023) – 1
- Salvage ship (2024) – 1
- Vehicle cargo ship (2026) – 2

Totals

Commissioned:	230
Non-commissioned:	83
Support:	64
Ready Reserve Force ships:	56
Reserve fleet:	28
Grand total:	461

== Images ==
Commissioned

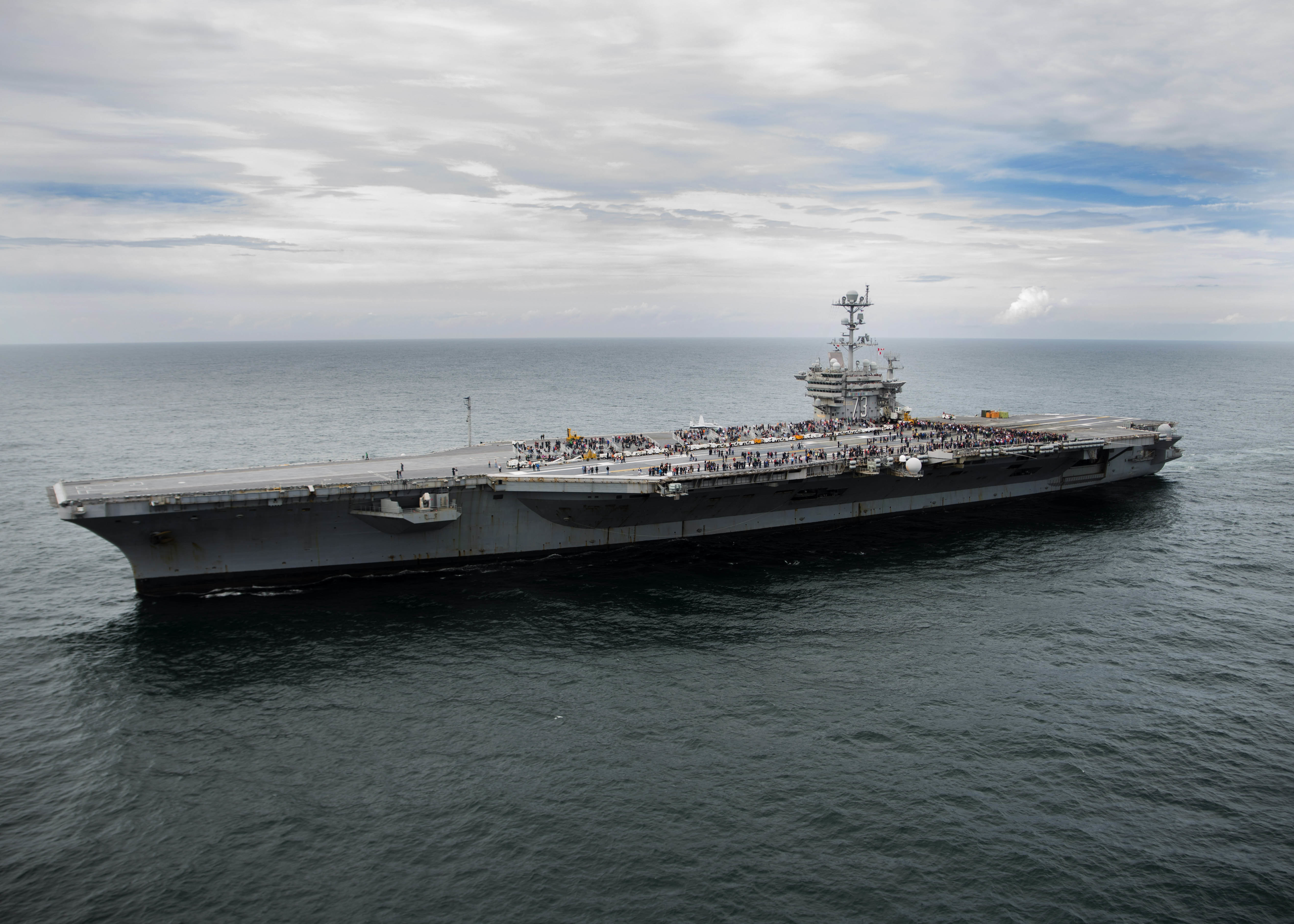
USS George Washington (CVN-73), a Nimitz-class aircraft carrier

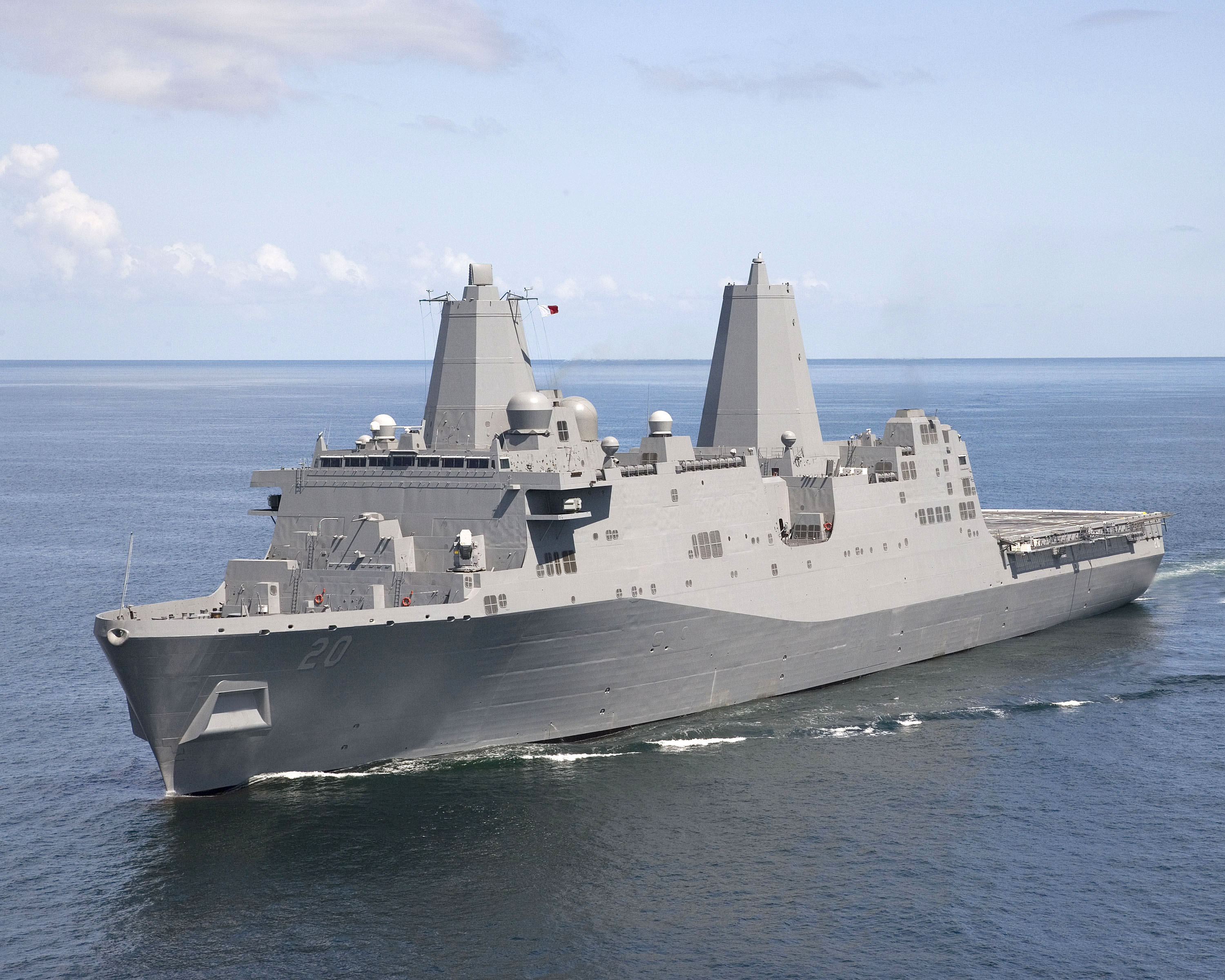
USS Green Bay (LPD-20), a San Antonio-class amphibious transport dock

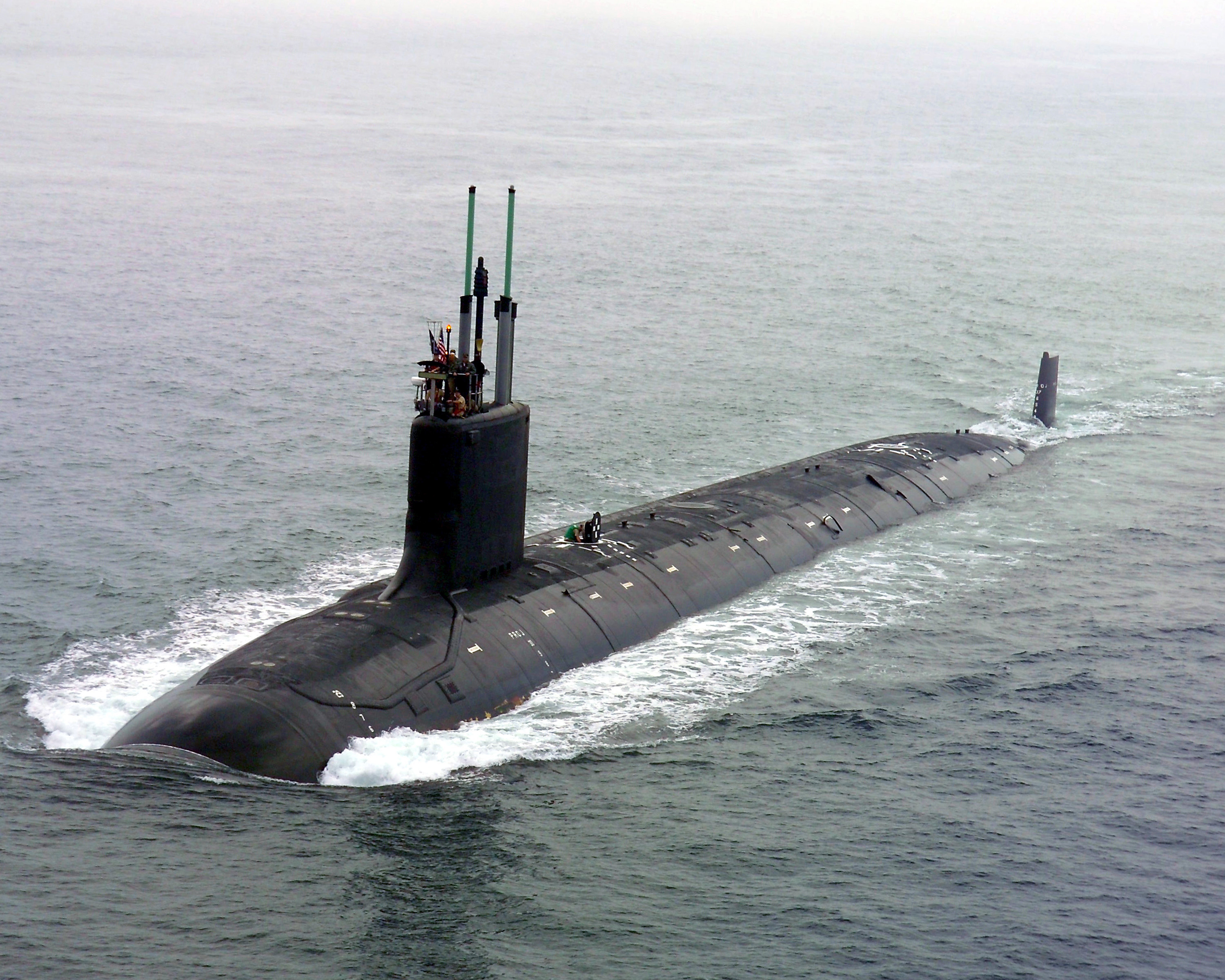
USS Virginia (SSN-774), a nuclear-powered fast attack submarine and the lead ship of her class

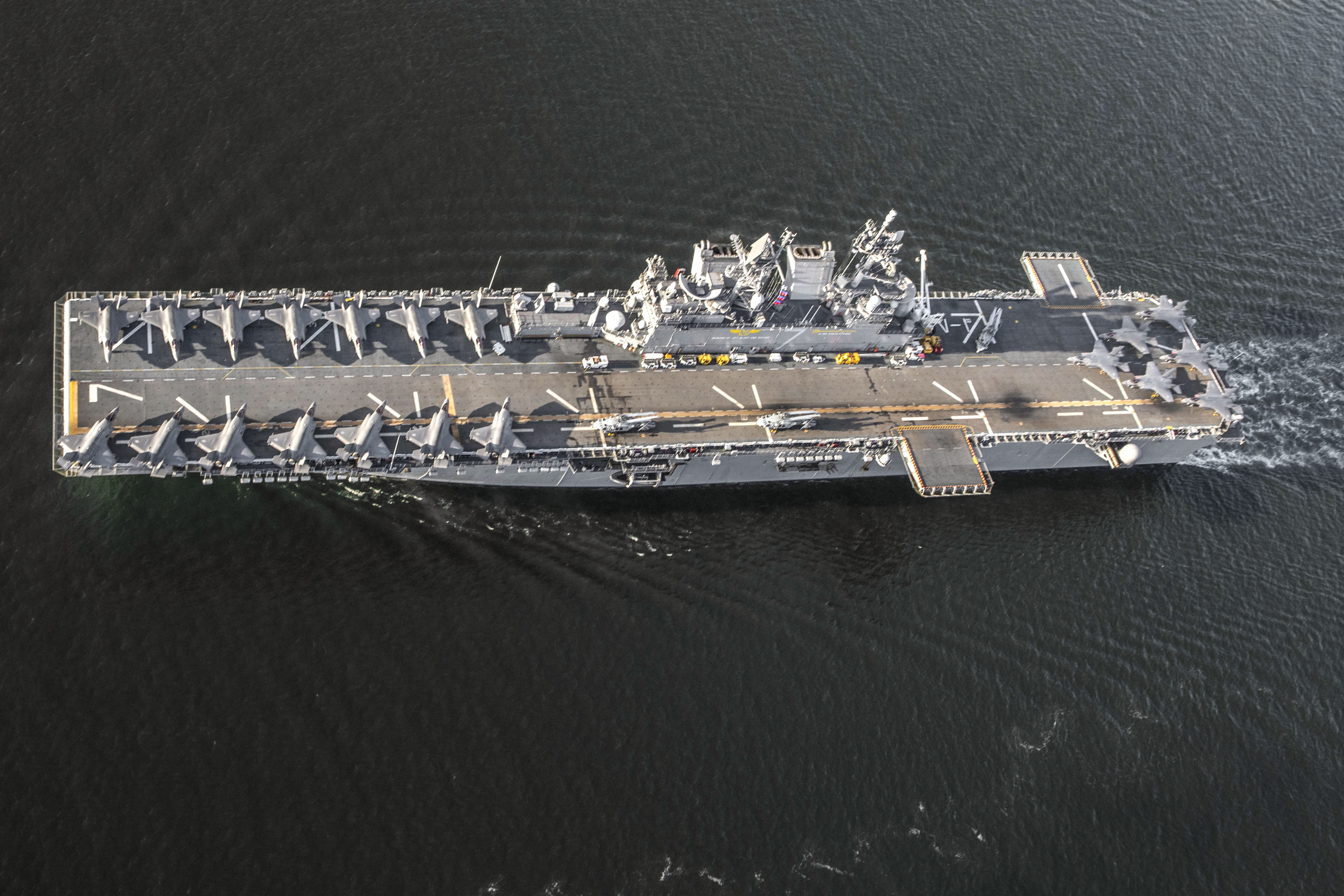
USS Tripoli (LHA-7), an America-class amphibious assault ship in light aircraft carrier mode with two squadrons of F-35B fighters aboard

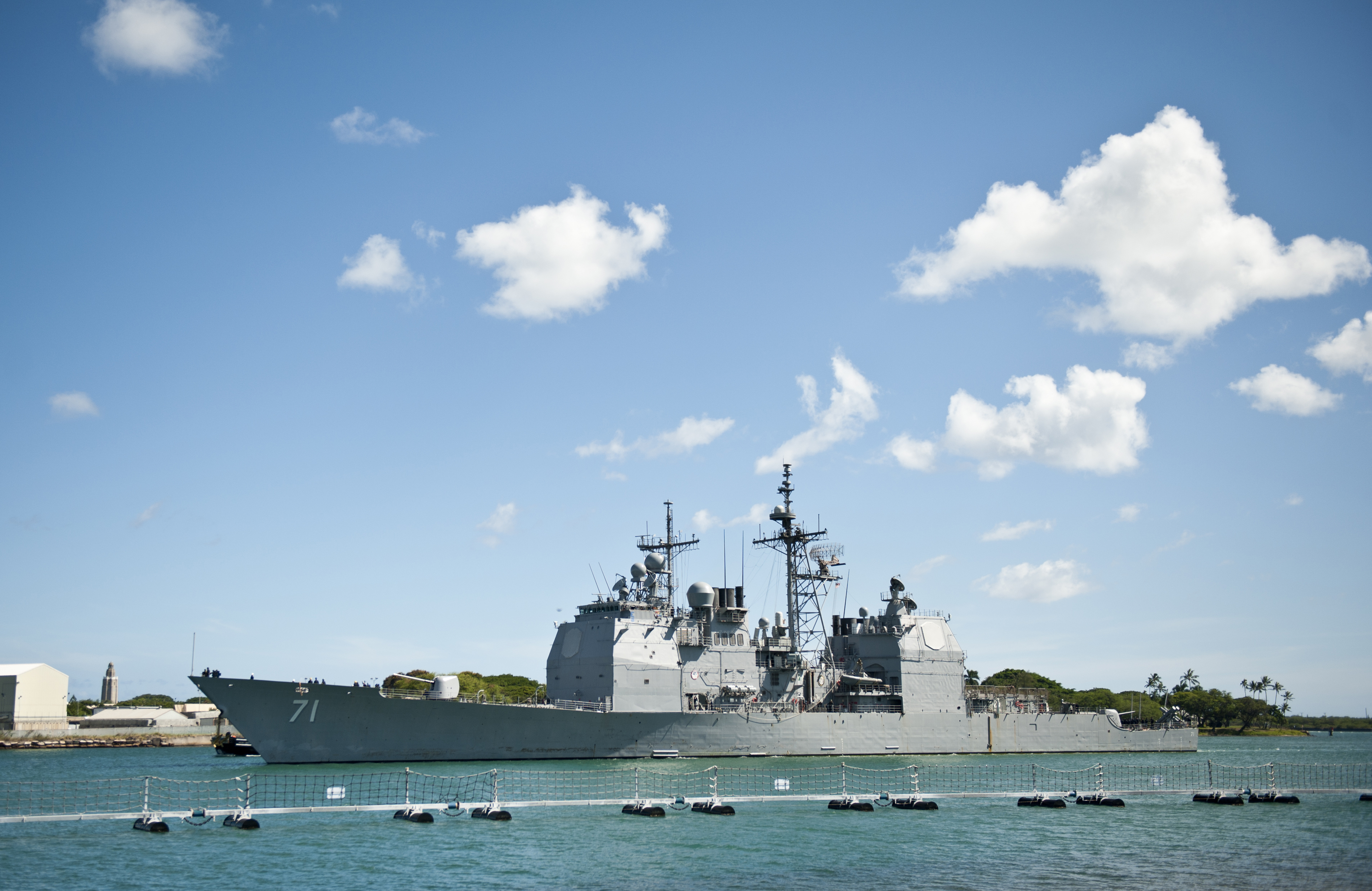
USS Cape St. George (CG-71), a Ticonderoga-class cruiser

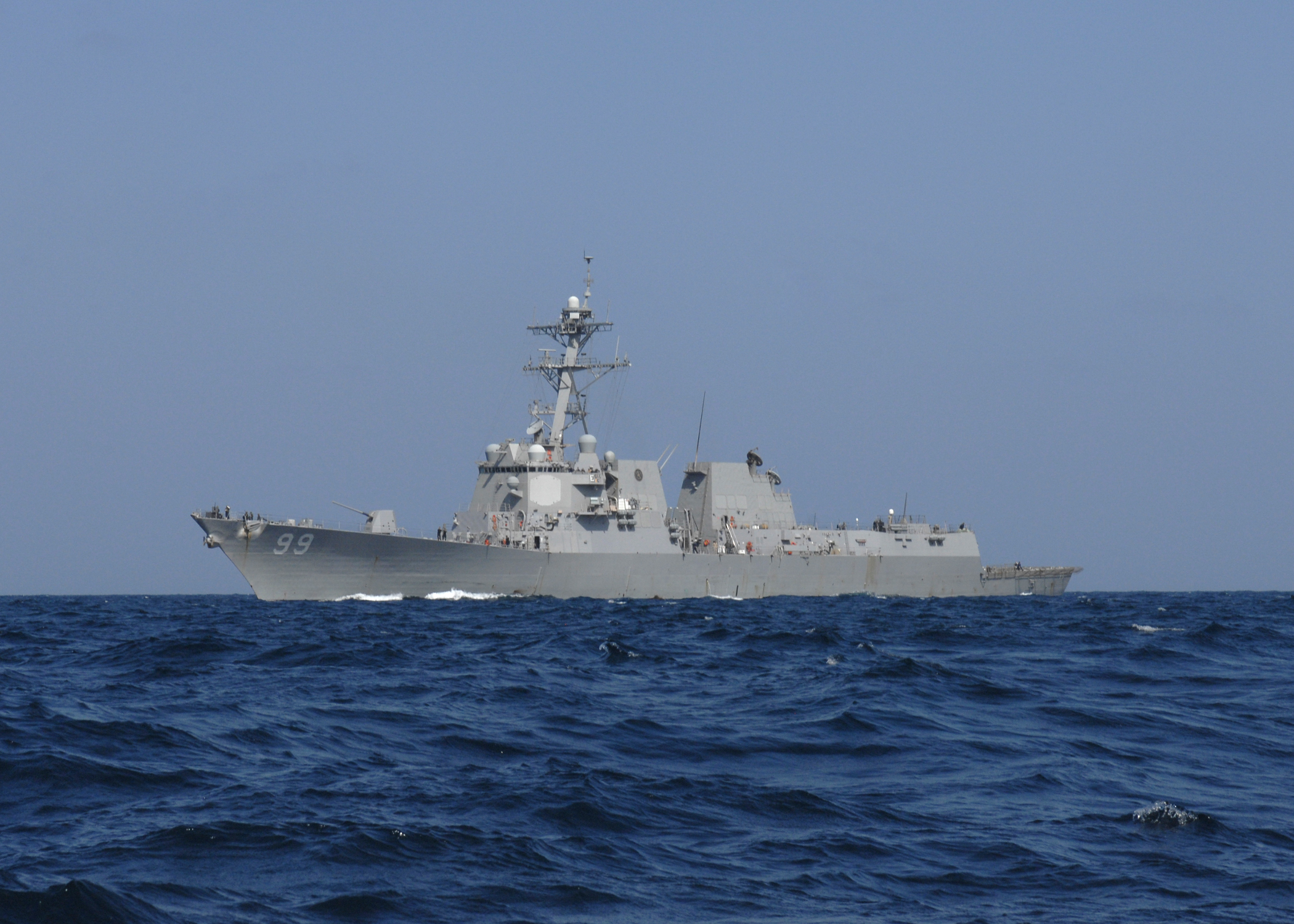
USS Farragut (DDG-99), an Arleigh Burke-class destroyer

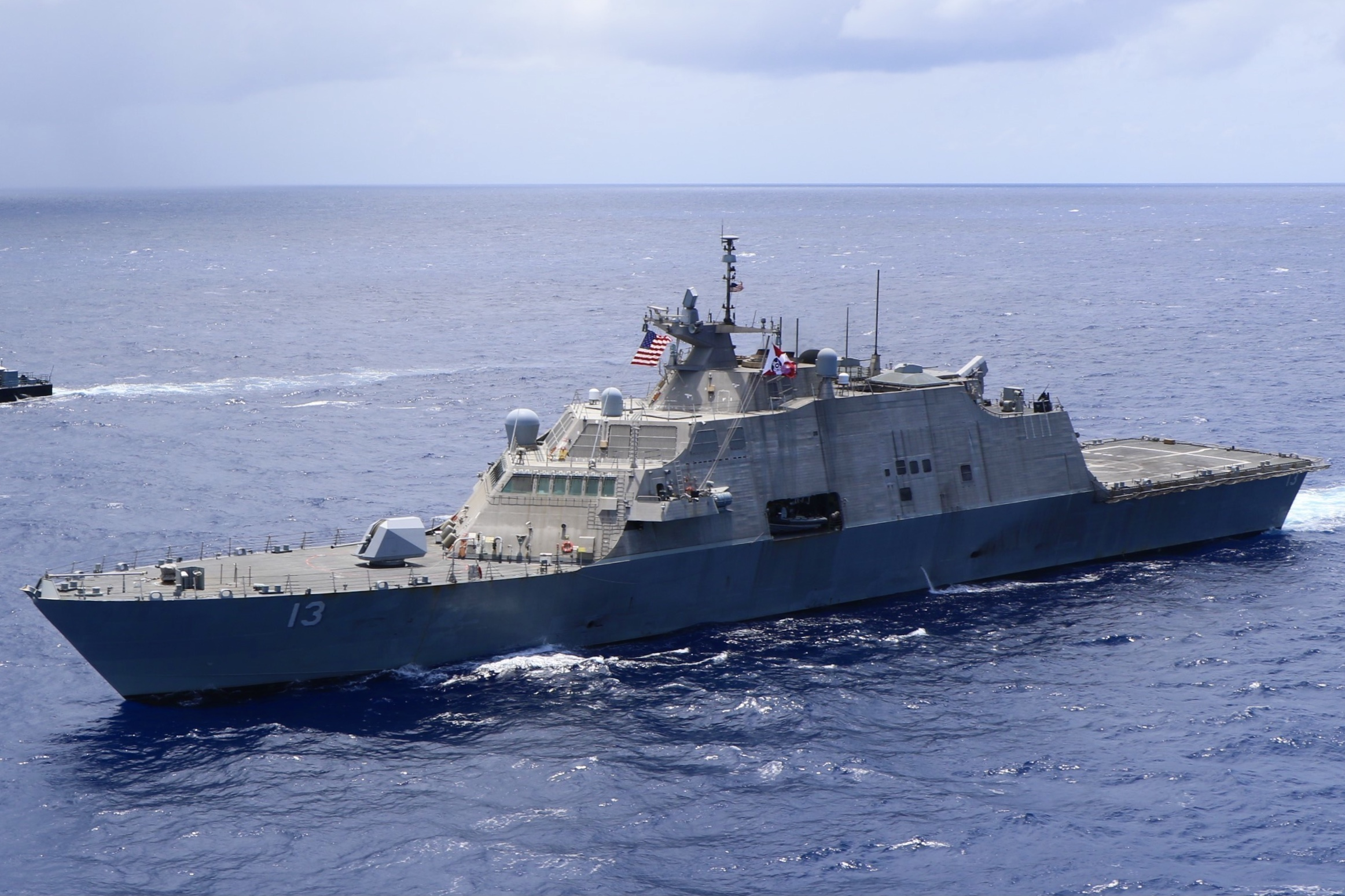
USS Wichita (LCS-13), a Freedom-class littoral combat ship

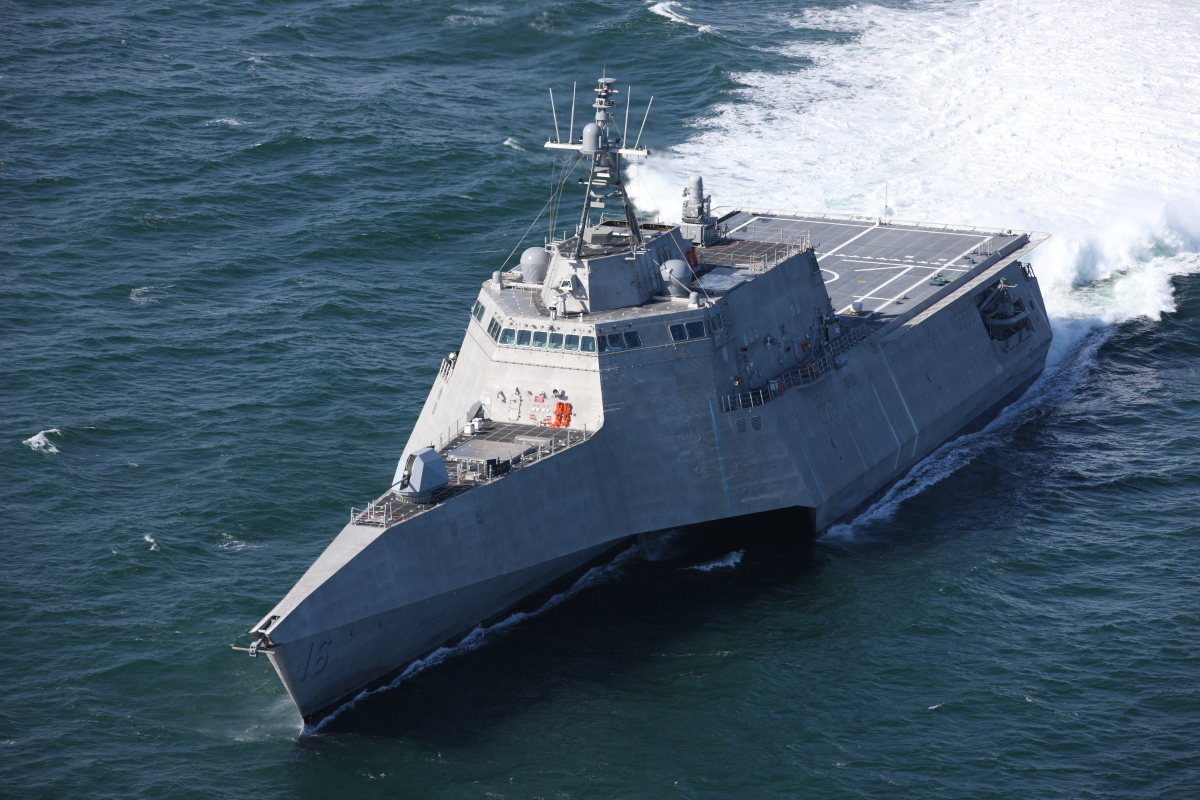
USS Tulsa (LCS-16), an Independence-class littoral combat ship

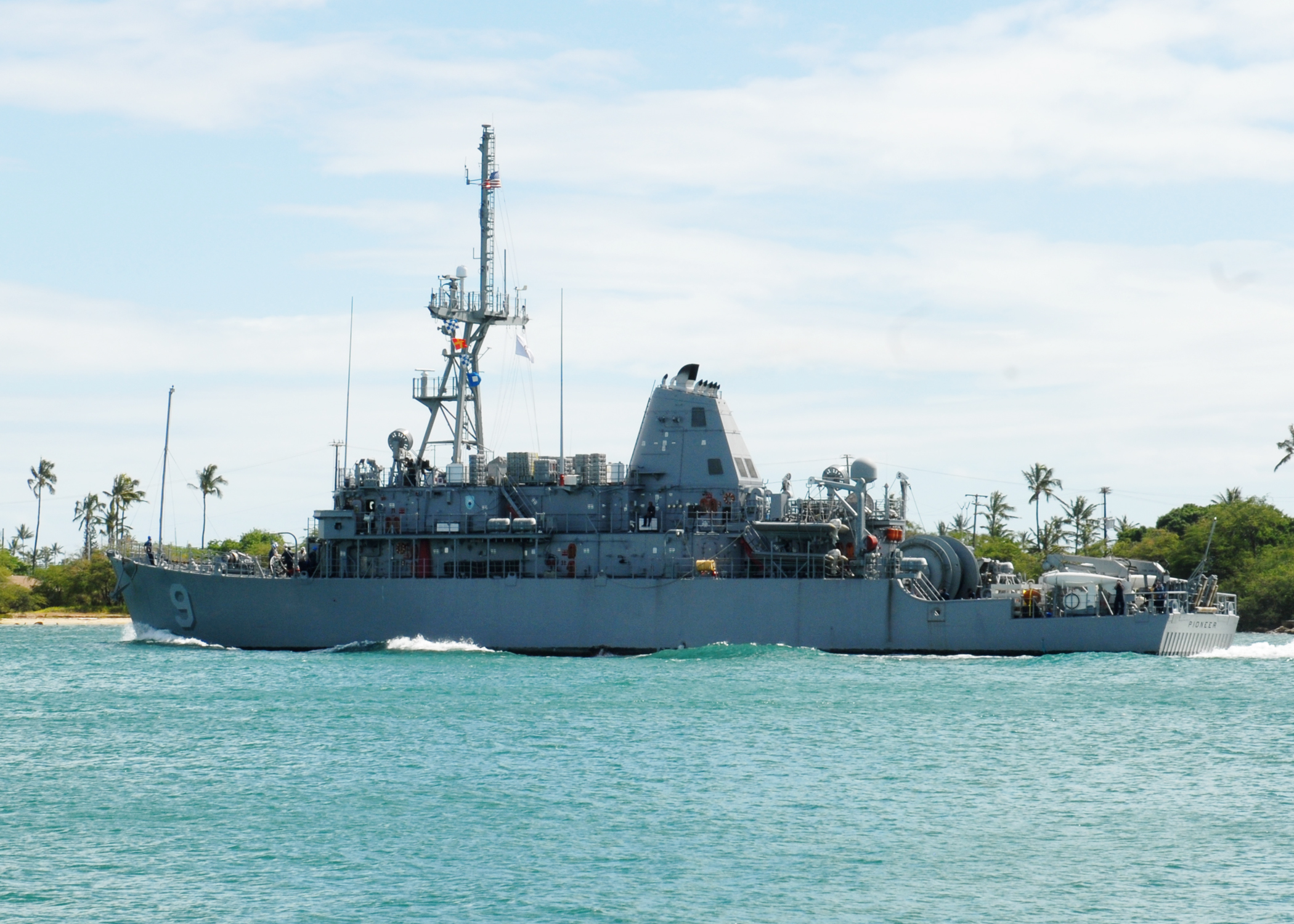
USS Pioneer (MCM-9), an Avenger-class mine countermeasures ship

Non-commissioned

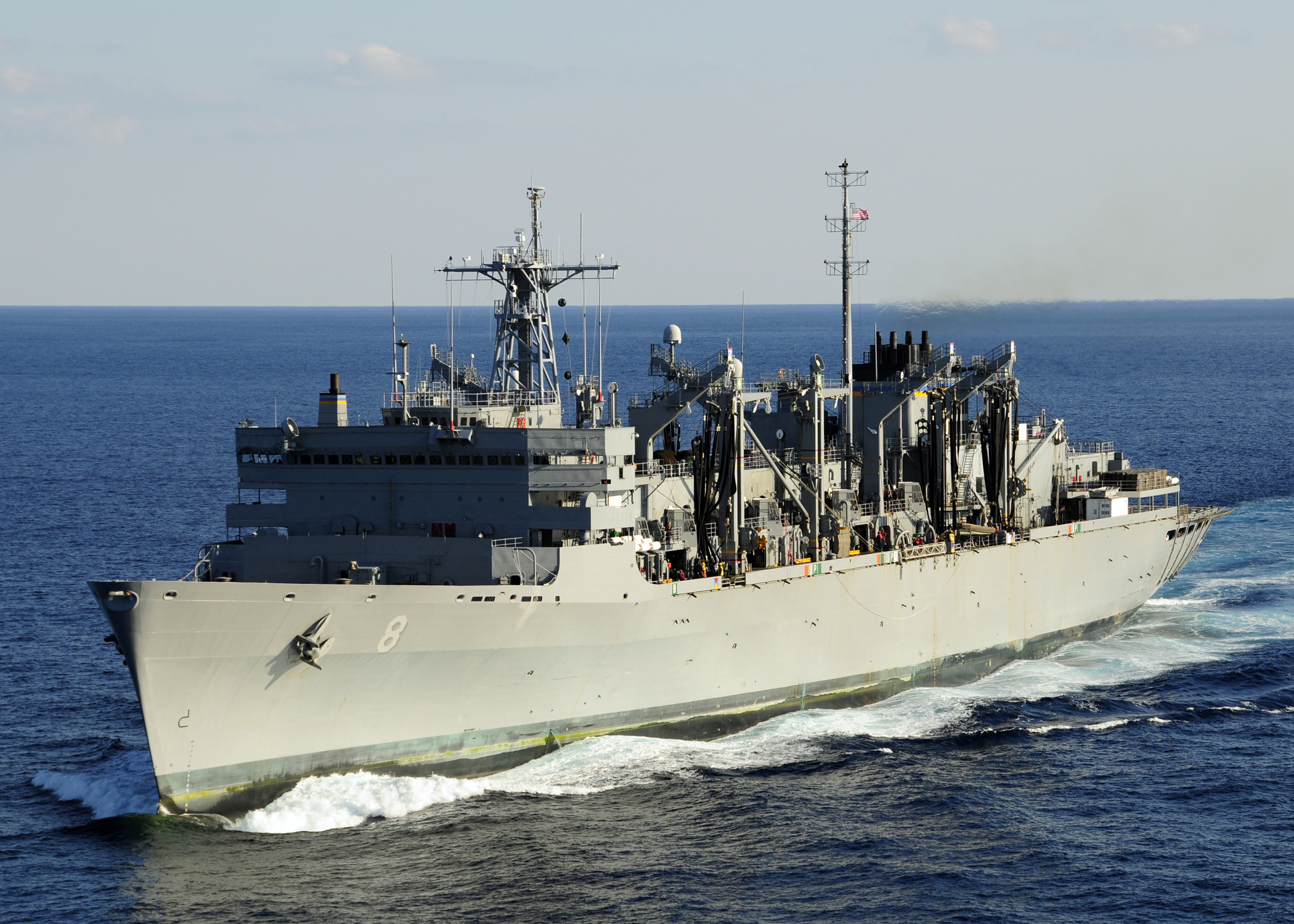
USNS Arctic (T-AOE-8), a Supply-class fast combat support ship

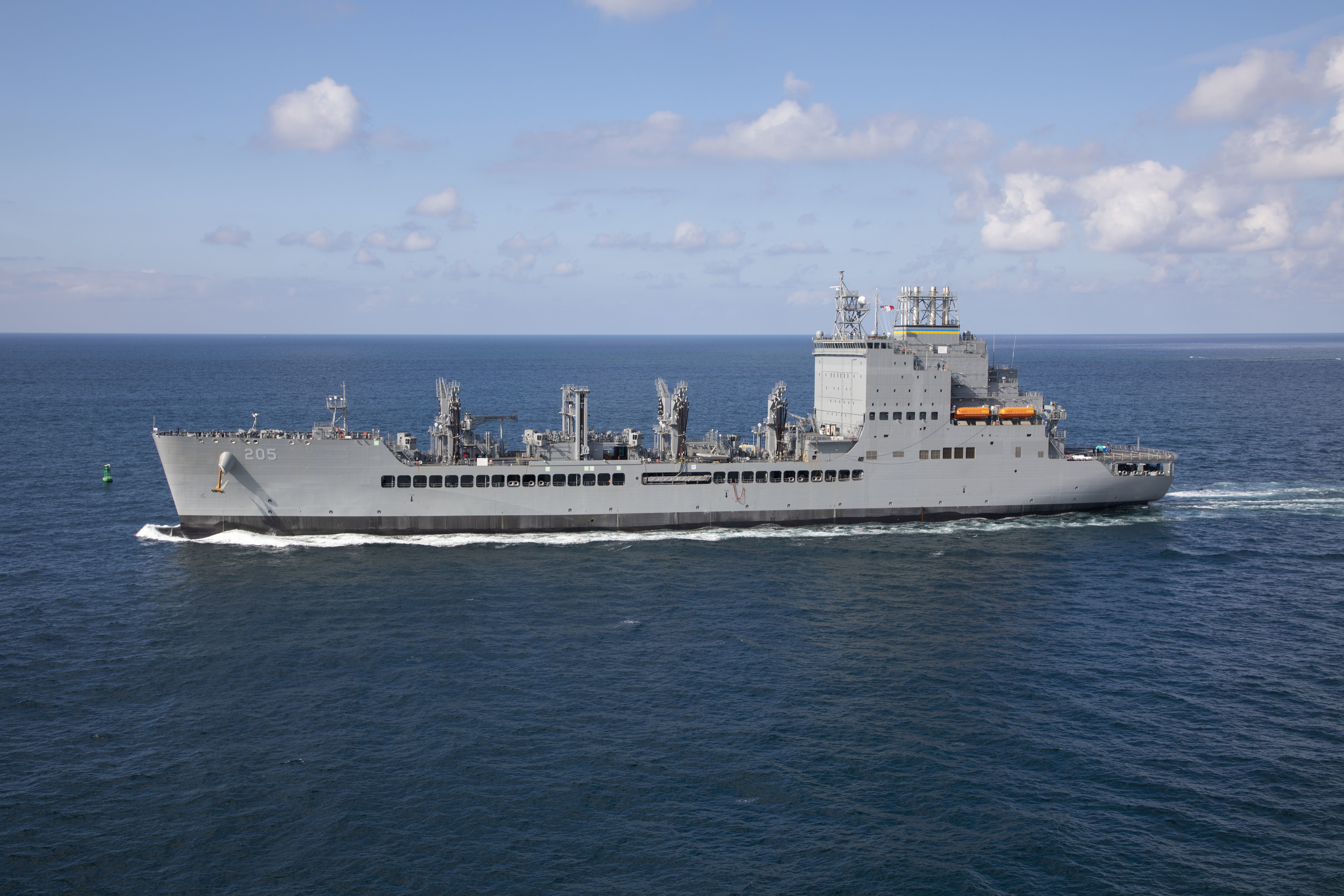
USNS John Lewis (T-AO-205), a replenishment oiler and the lead ship of her class

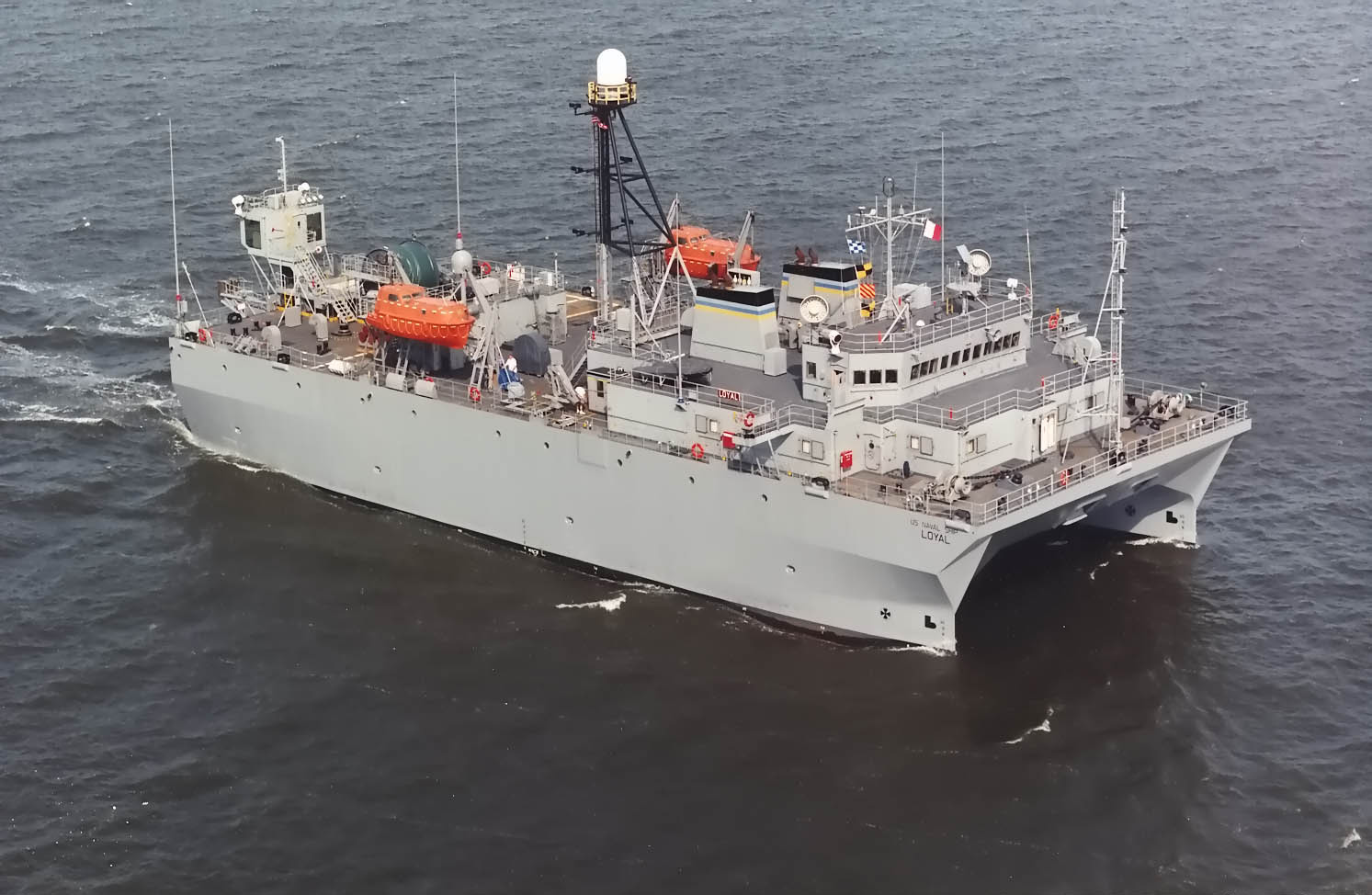
USNS Loyal (T-AGOS-22), a Victorious-class ocean surveillance ship

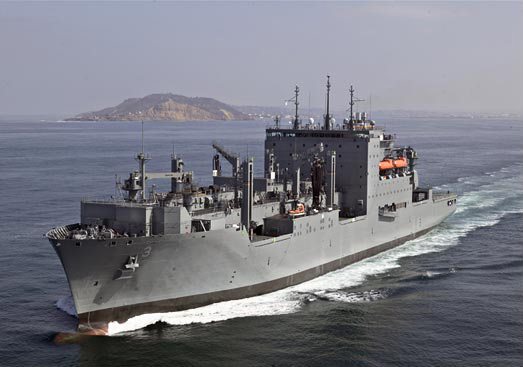
USNS Alan Shepard (T-AKE-3), a Lewis and Clark-class dry cargo ship

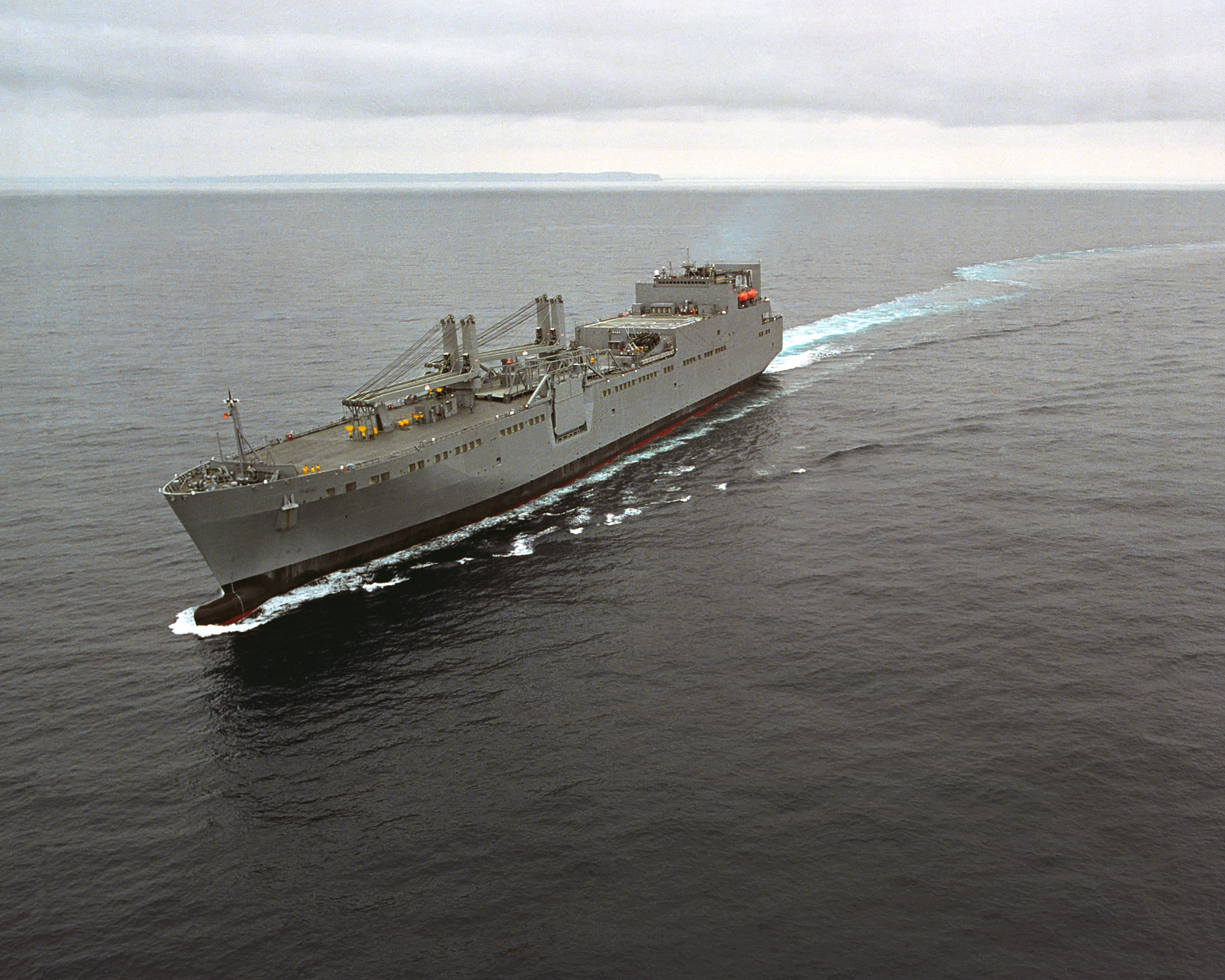
USNS Pomeroy (T-AKR-316), a Watson-class vehicle cargo ship

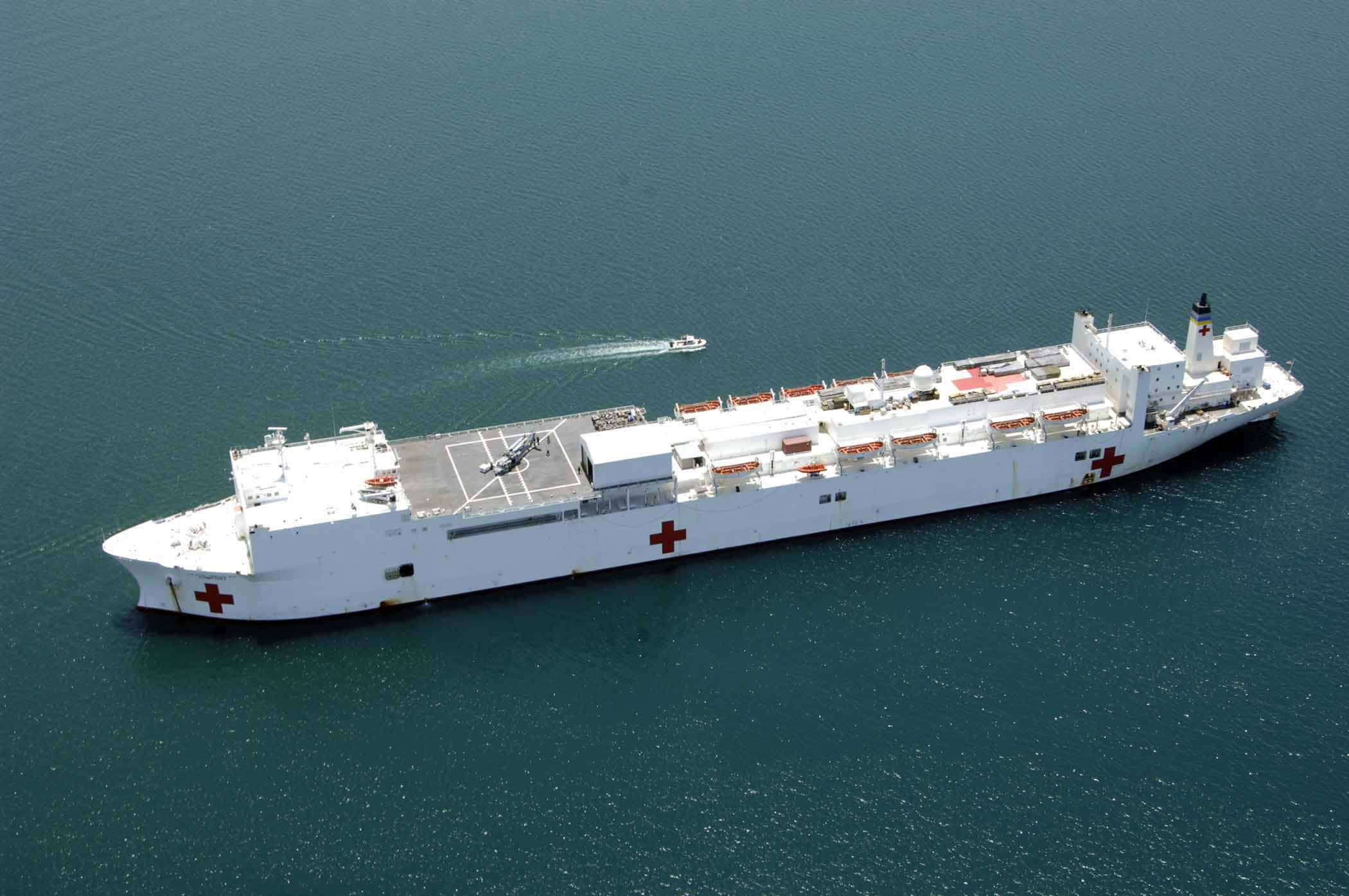
USNS Comfort (T-AH-20), a Mercy-class hospital ship

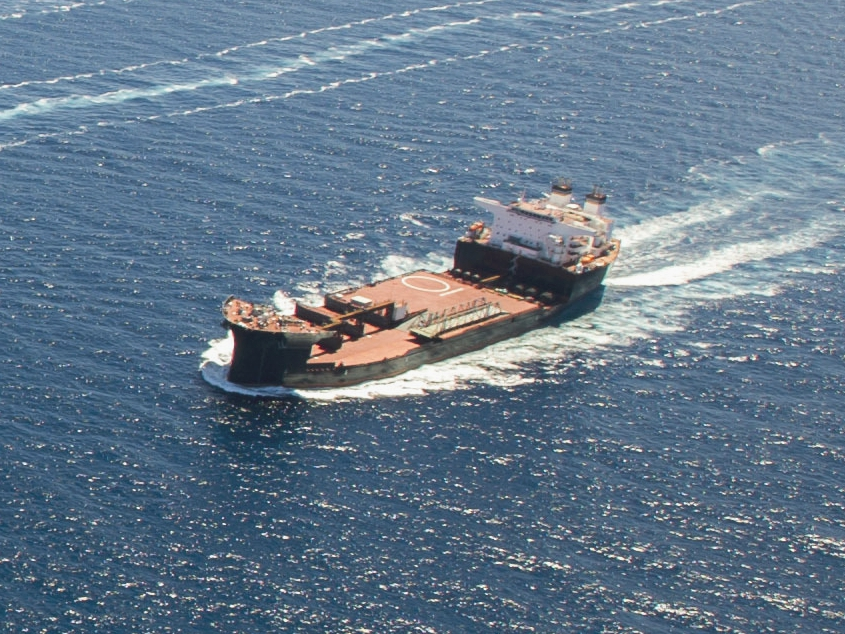
USNS Montford Point (T-ESD-1), an expeditionary transfer dock and lead ship of her class

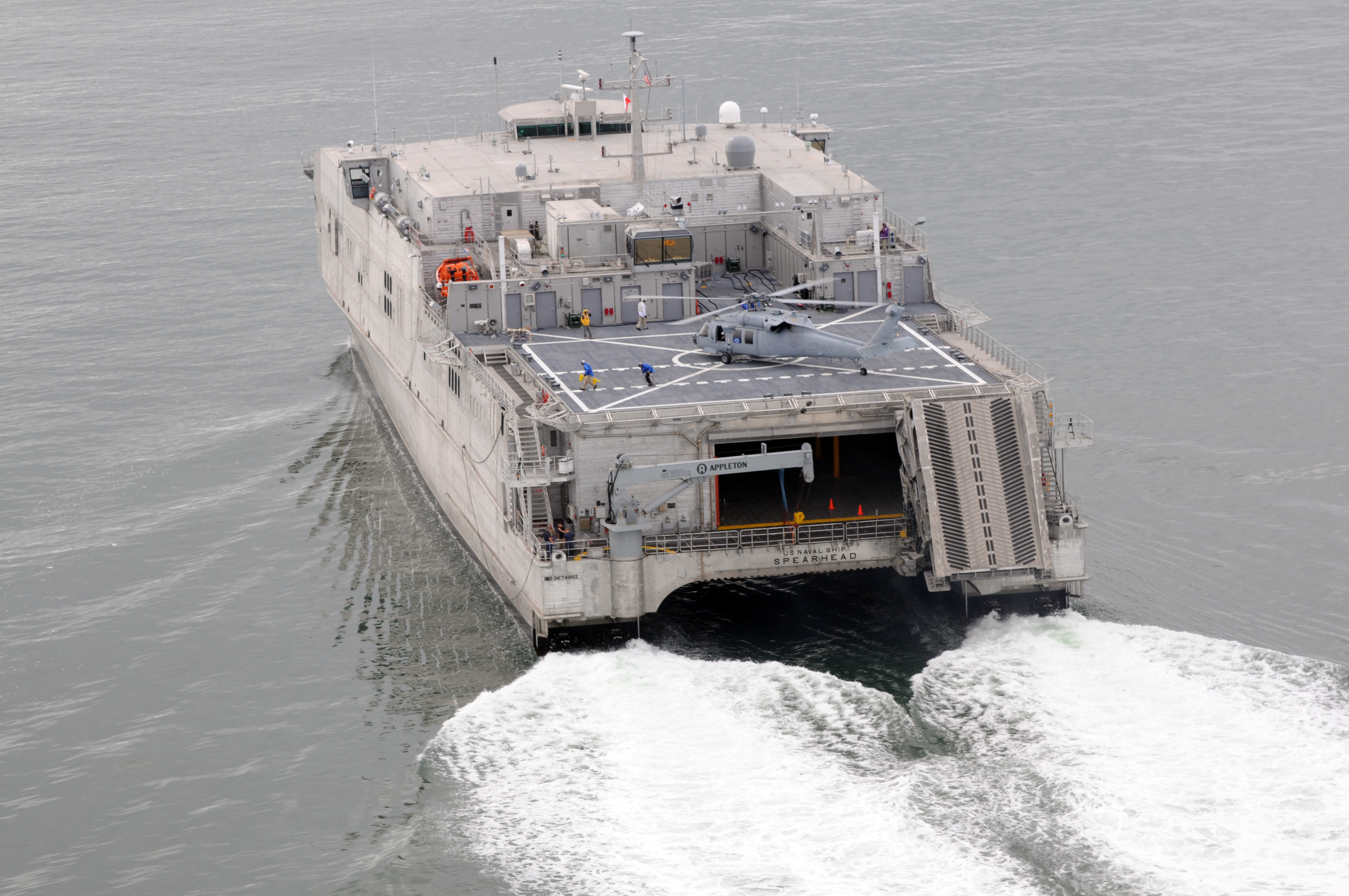
USNS Spearhead (T-EPF-1), an expeditionary fast transport and the lead ship of her class

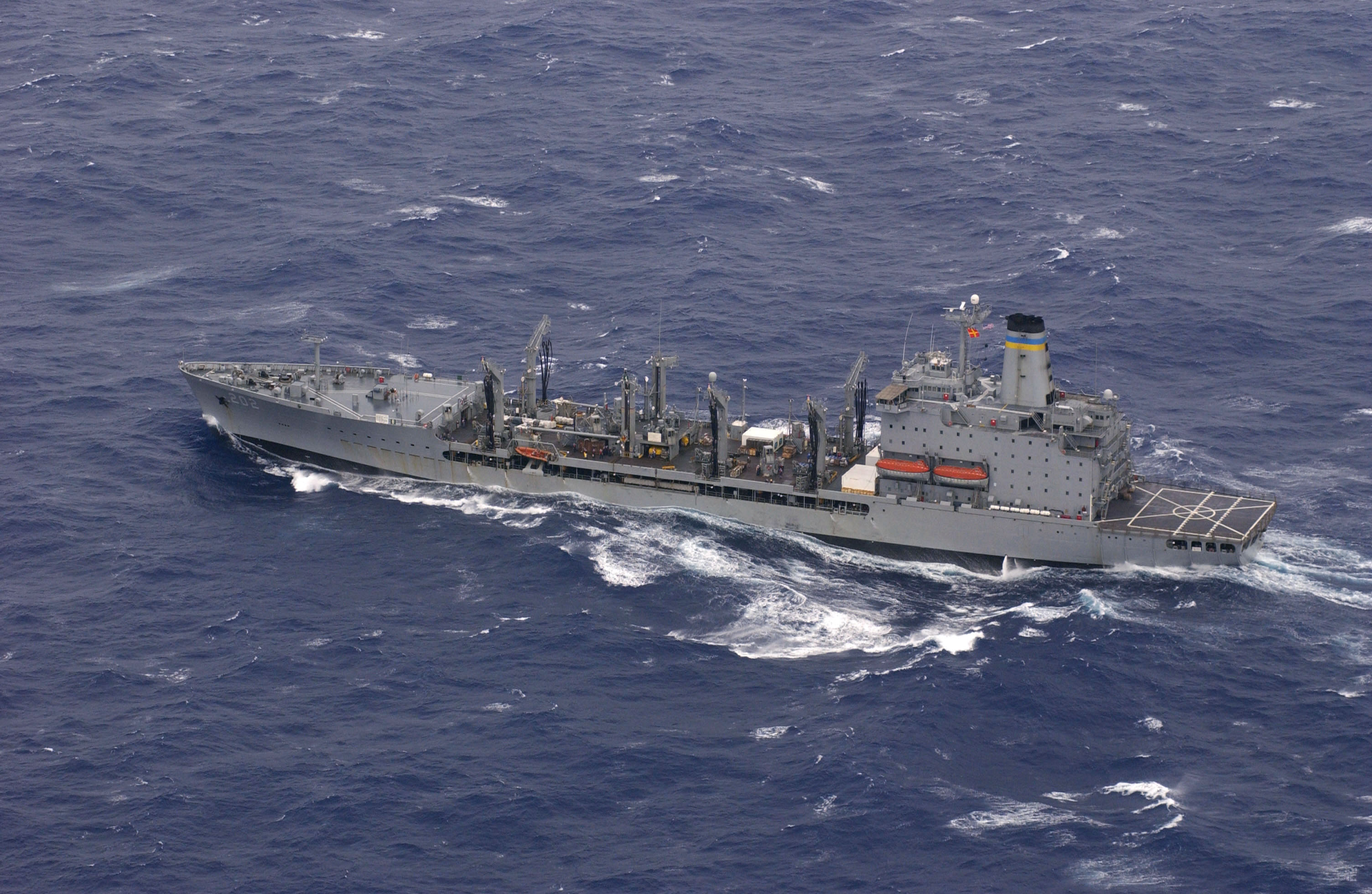
USNS Yukon (T-AO-202), a Henry J. Kaiser-class replenishment oiler

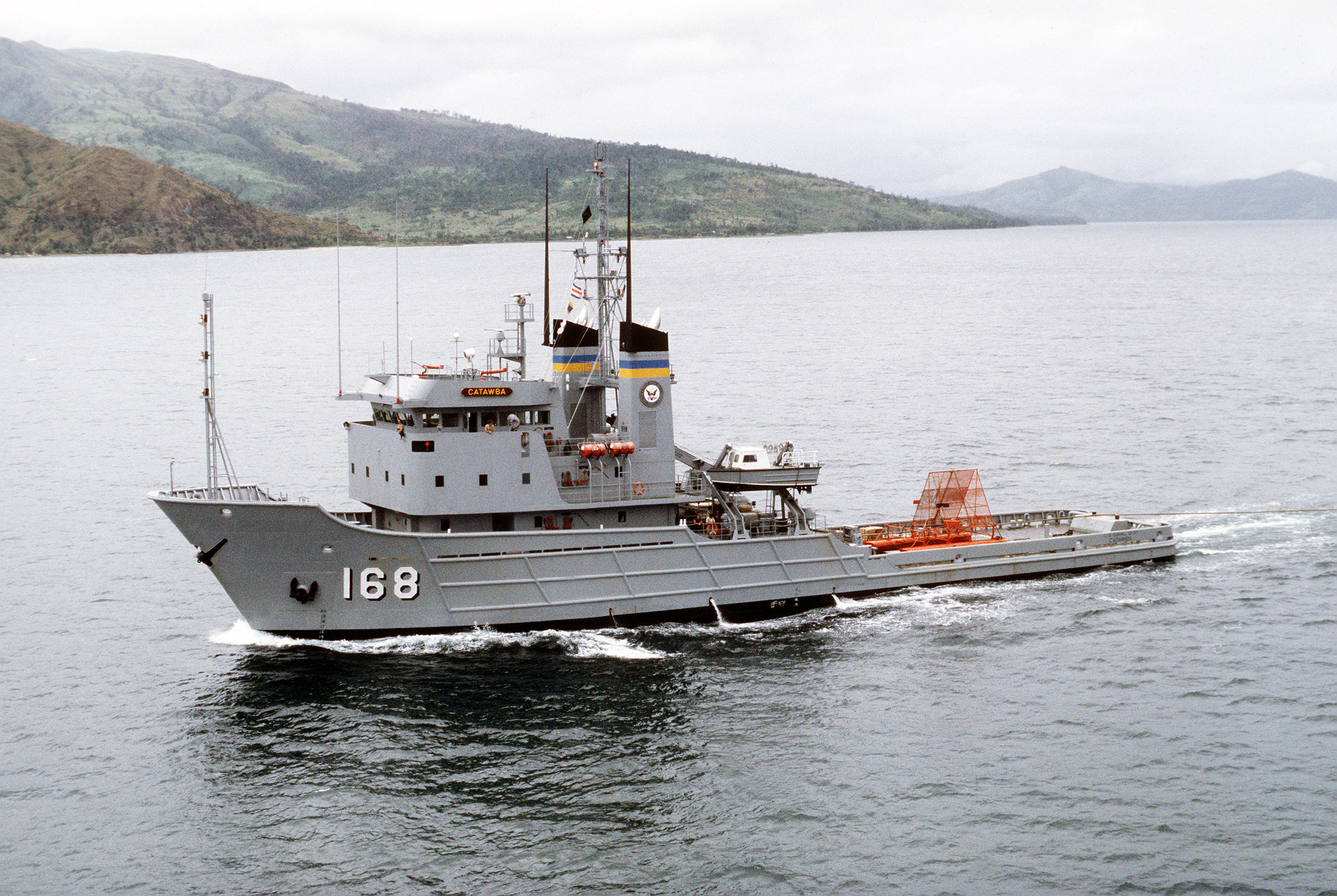
USNS Catawba (T-ATF-168), a Powhatan-class tugboat

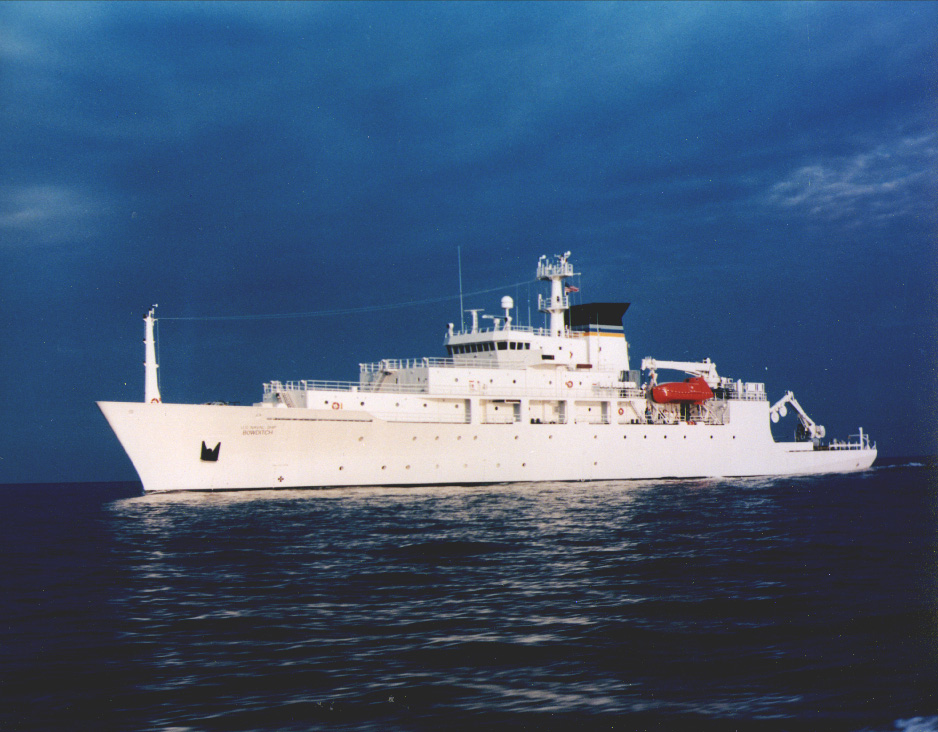
USNS Bowditch (T-AGS-62), a Pathfinder-class survey ship

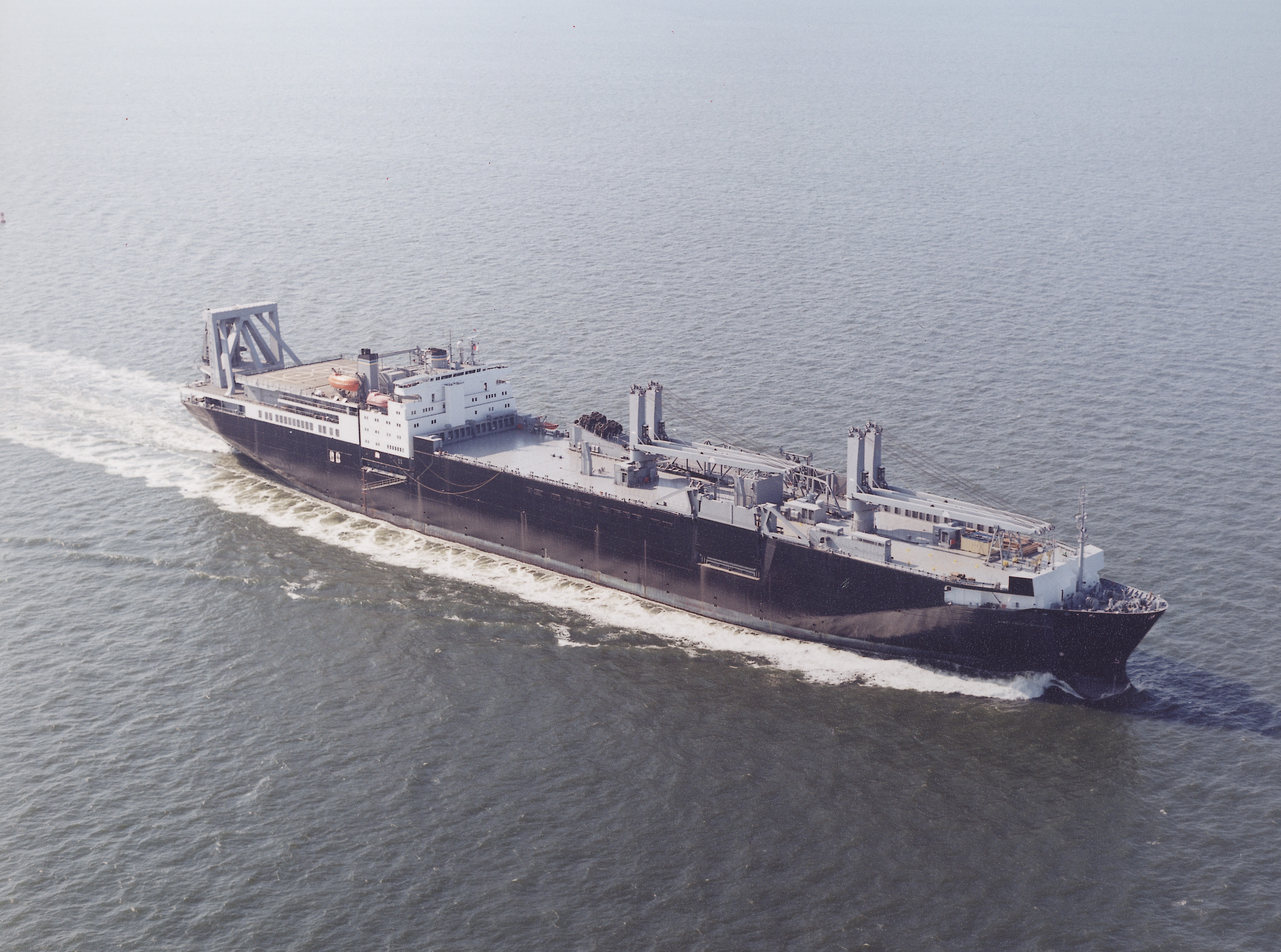
USNS GySgt. Fred W. Stockham (T-AK-3017), a Shughart-class roll-on/roll-off vehicle cargo ship and part of the Maritime prepositioning program

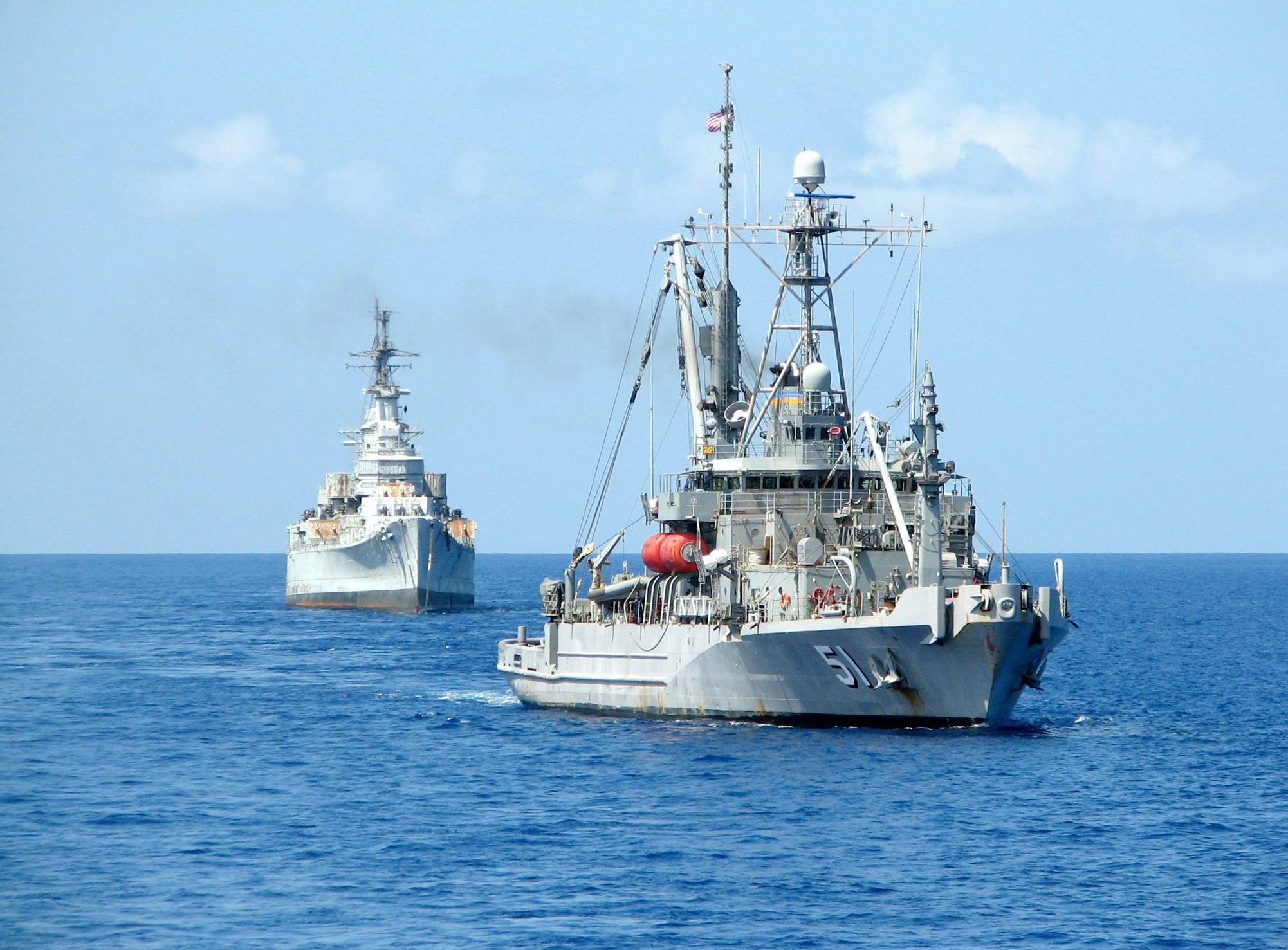
USNS Grasp (T-ARS-51), a Safeguard-class rescue and salvage ship, tows ex-USS Des Moines (CA-134) to the scrapyard in Texas

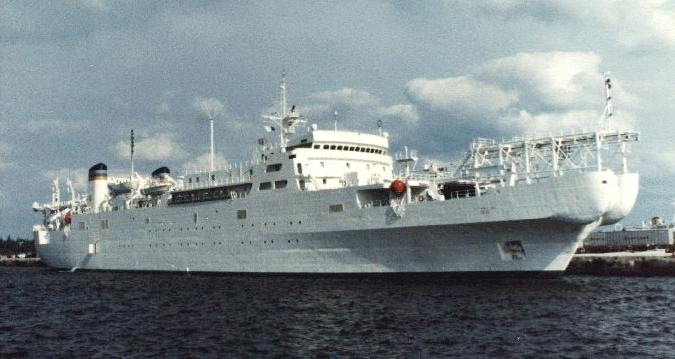
USNS Zeus (T-ARC-7), a cable ship built specifically for the US Navy, she is the only ship in her class and the only ship of her kind in the Navy

Support

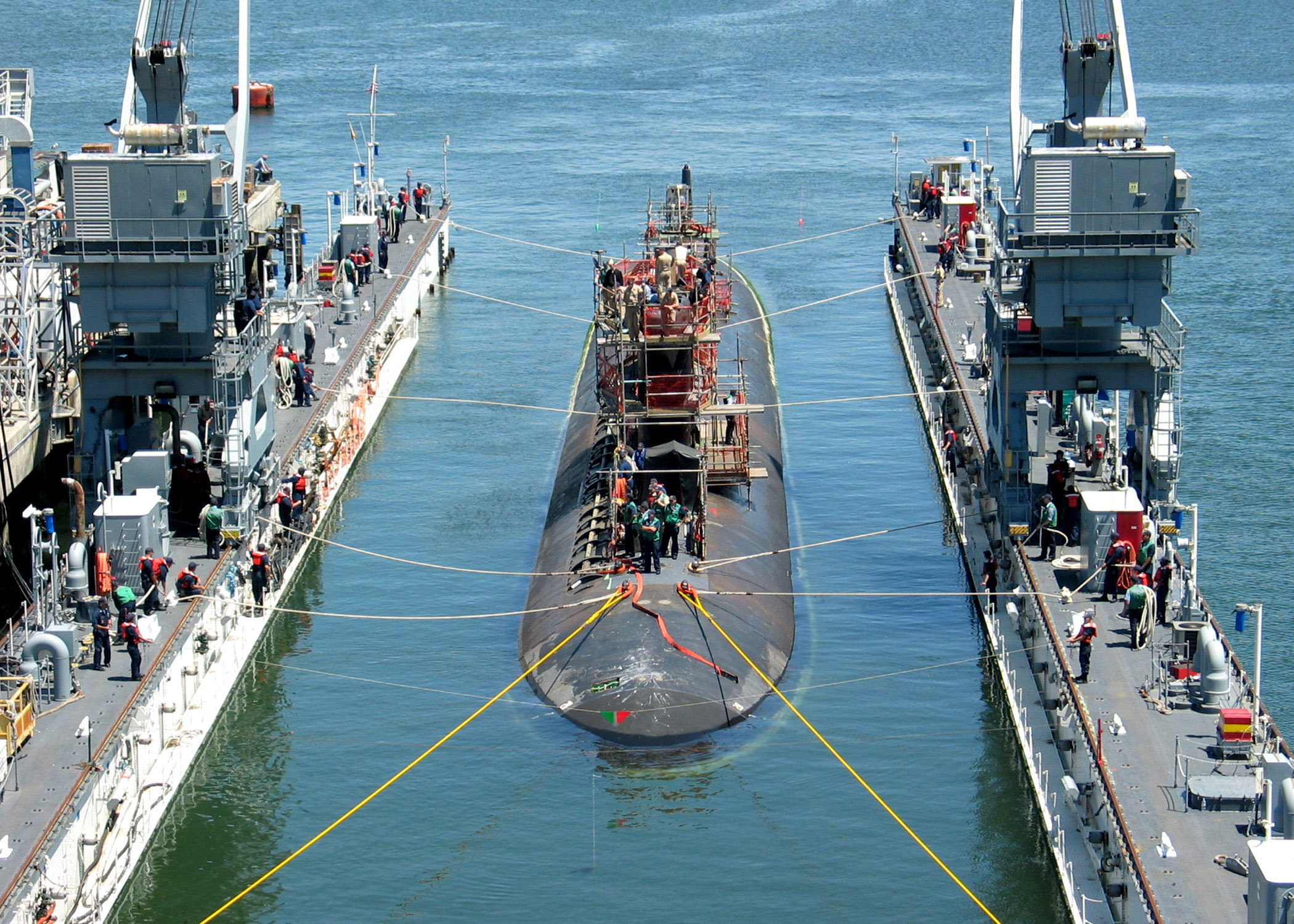
Arco (ARDM-5), an ARDM-5-class floating dry dock, servicing a Los Angeles-class submarine

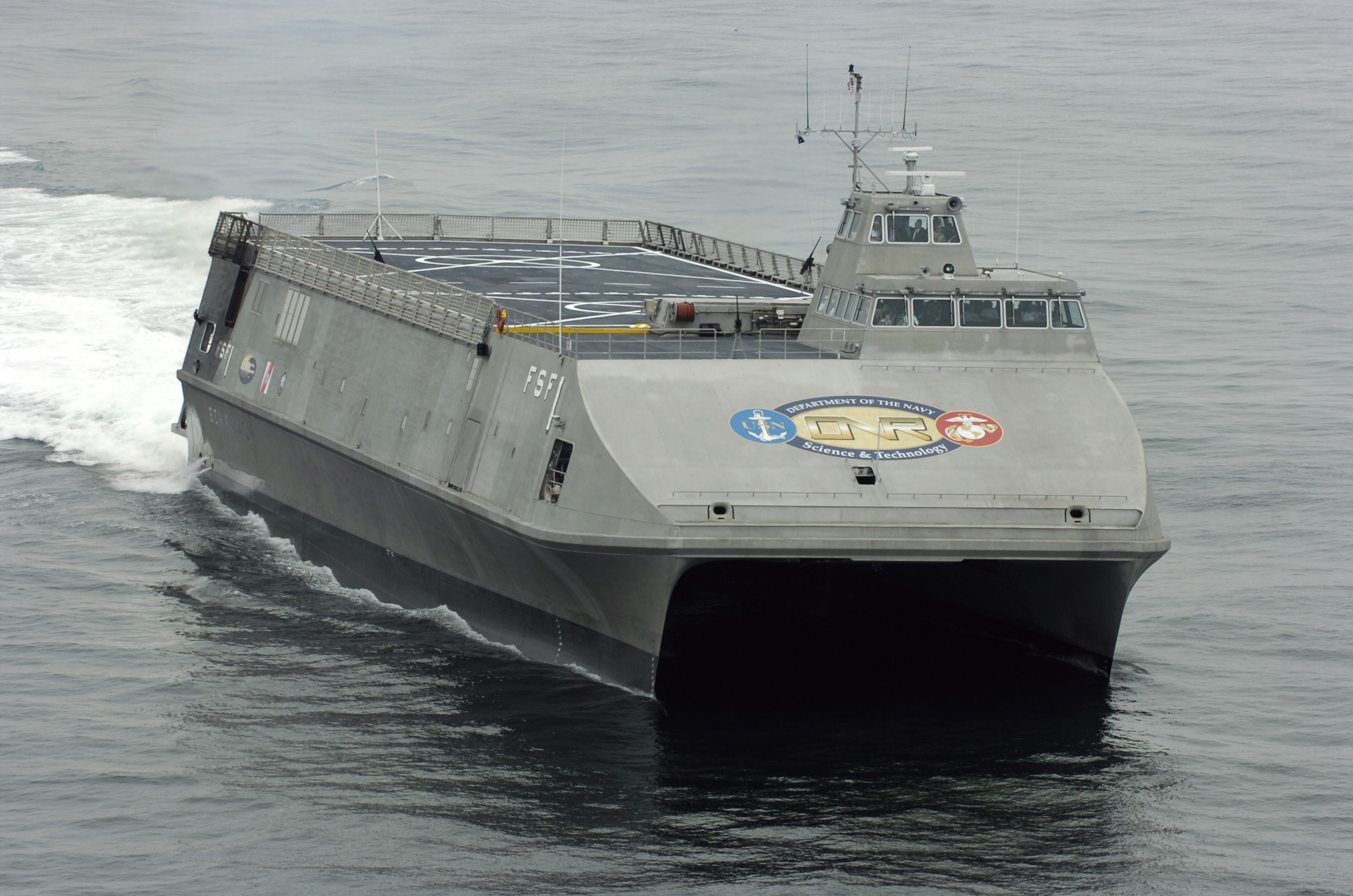
Sea Fighter (FSF-1), a fast sea frame and experimental littoral combat ship

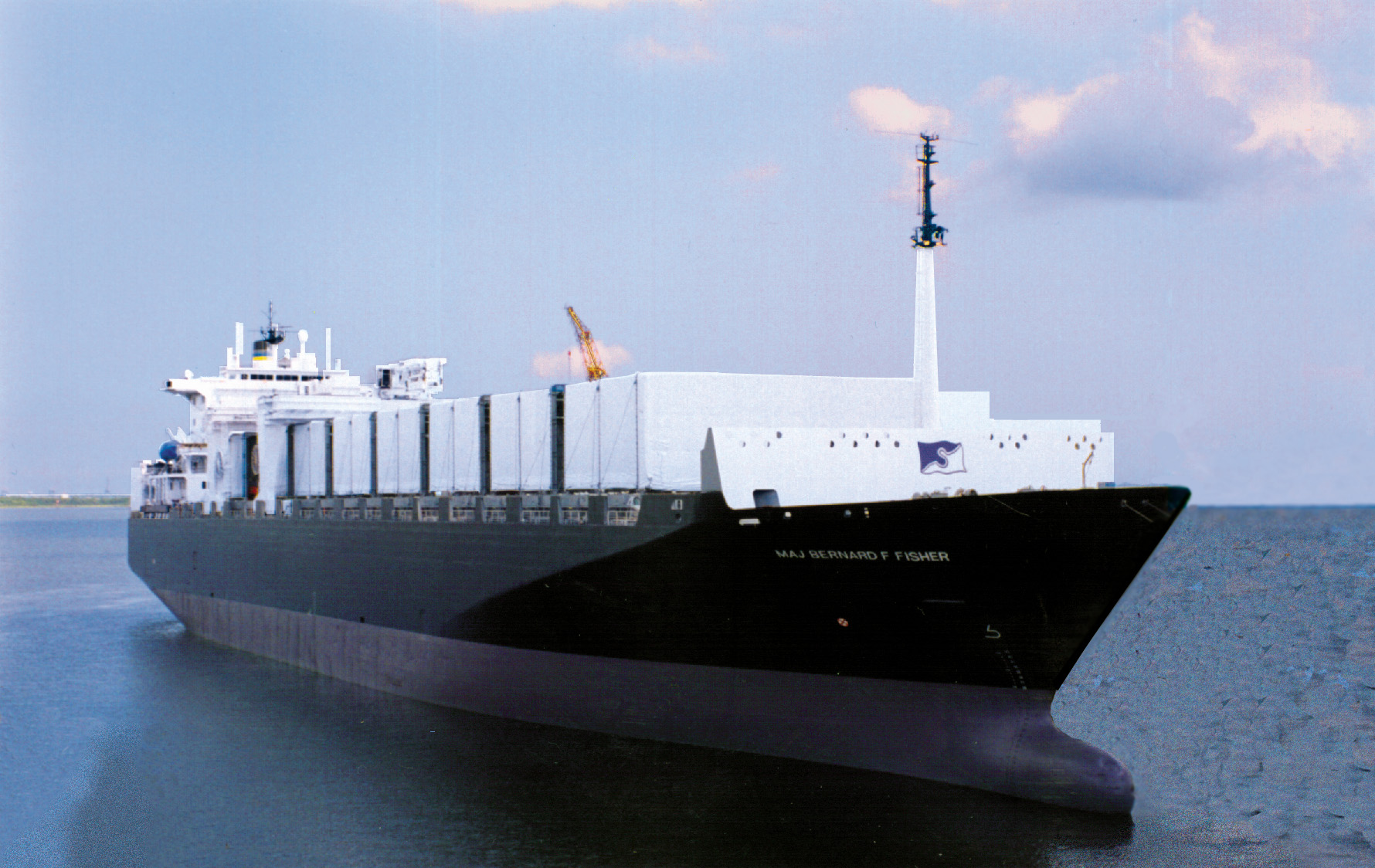
MV Maj. Bernard F. Fisher (T-AK-4396), a LTC Calvin P. Titus-class container ship

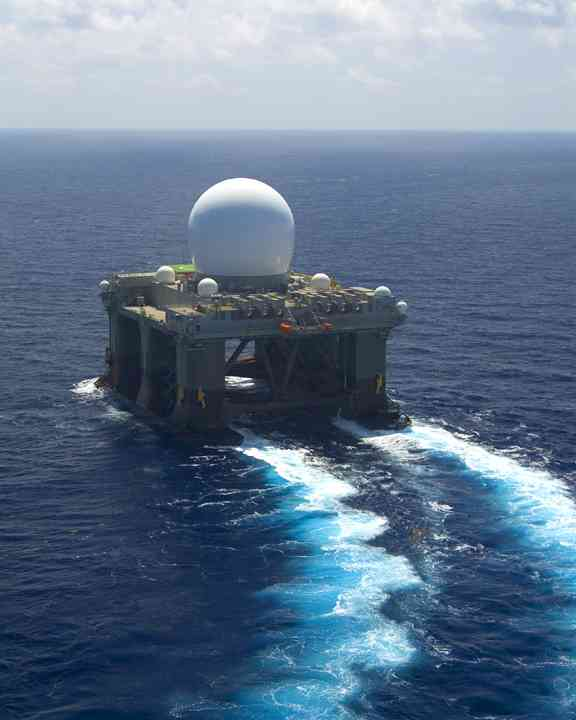
Sea-based X-band Radar underway at sea

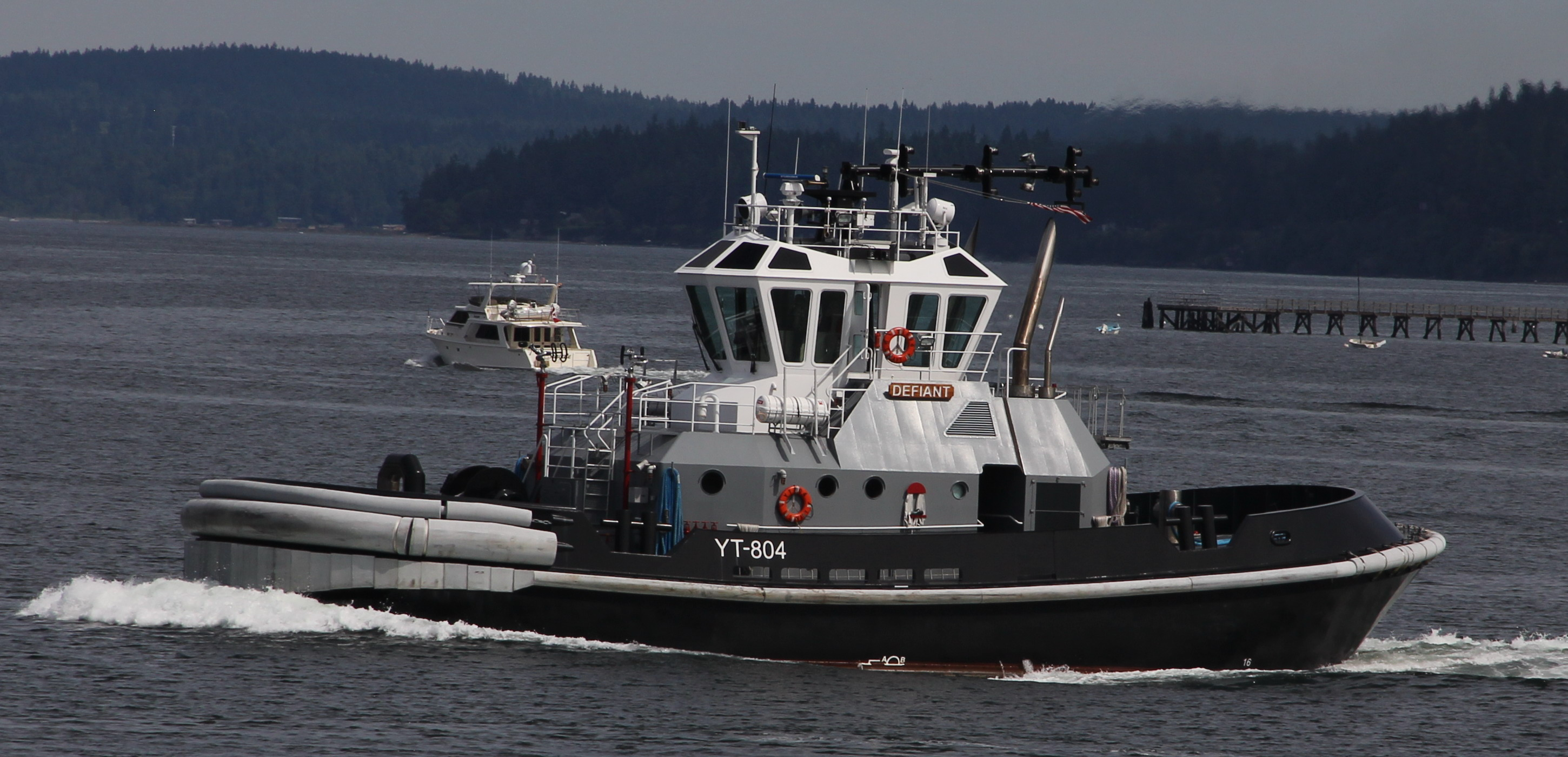
Defiant (YT-804), a Valiant-class harbor tug

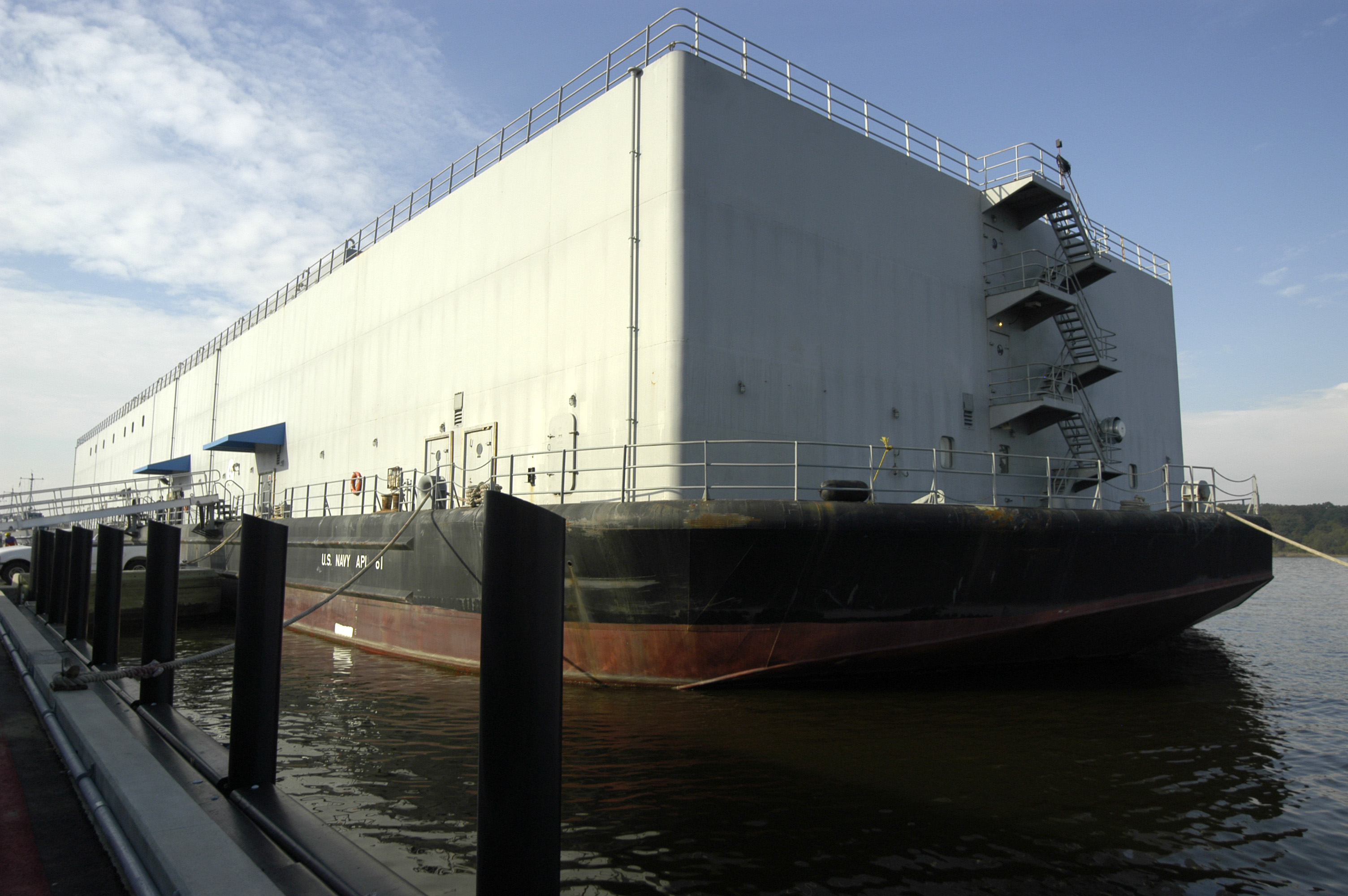
APL-61, a non self-propelled barracks ship and lead ship of her class, moored alongside the United States Naval Academy

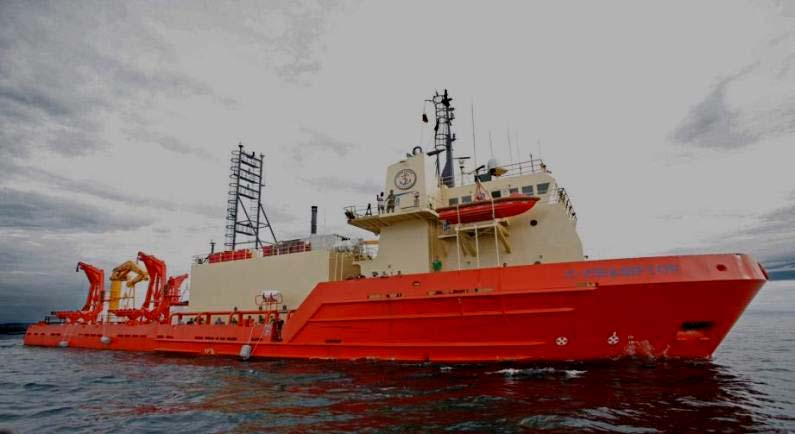
MV C Champion, a submarine and special warfare support vessel

Ready Reserve Force ships

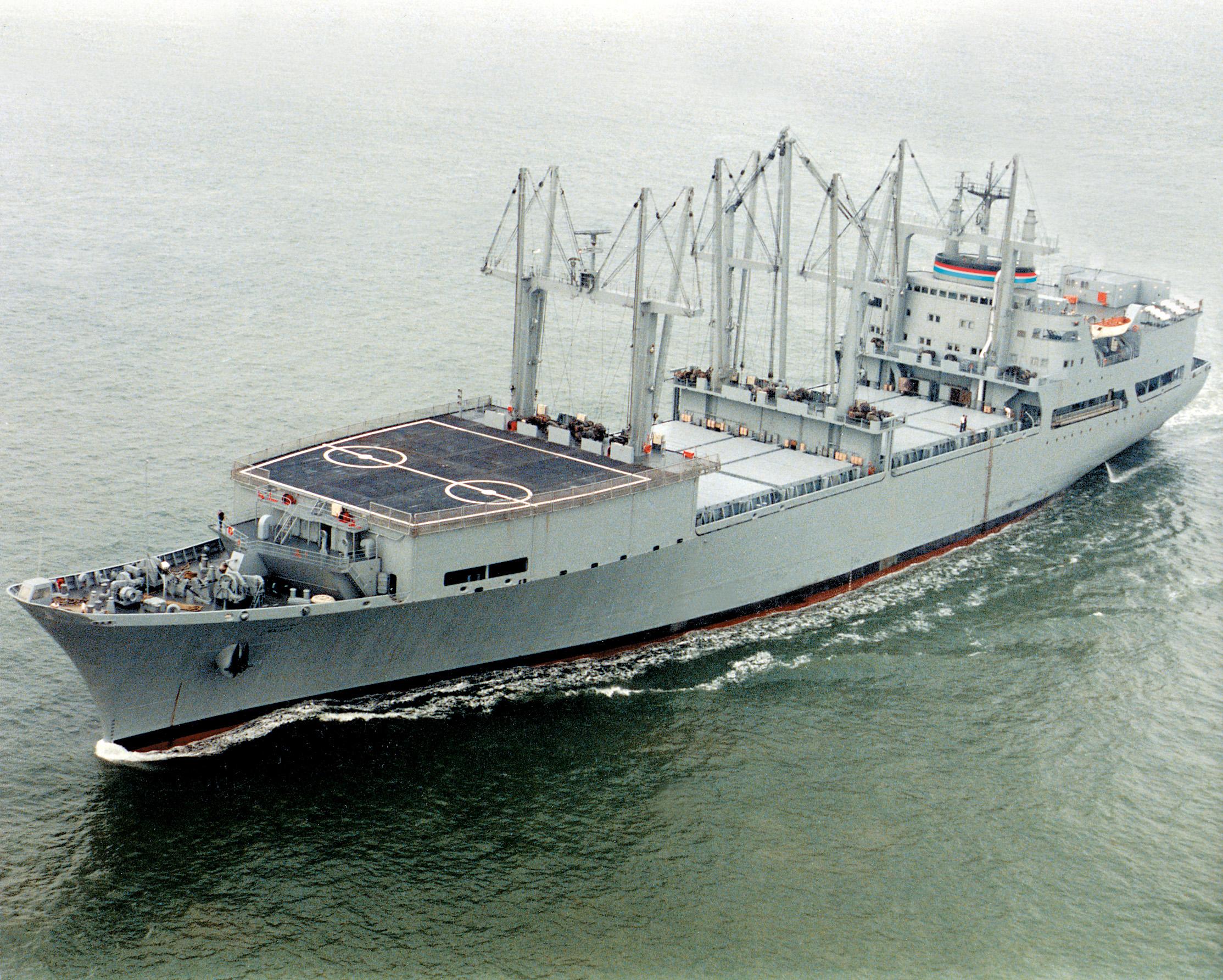
SS Wright (T-AVB-3), an aviation logistics support ship, the lead ship of her class

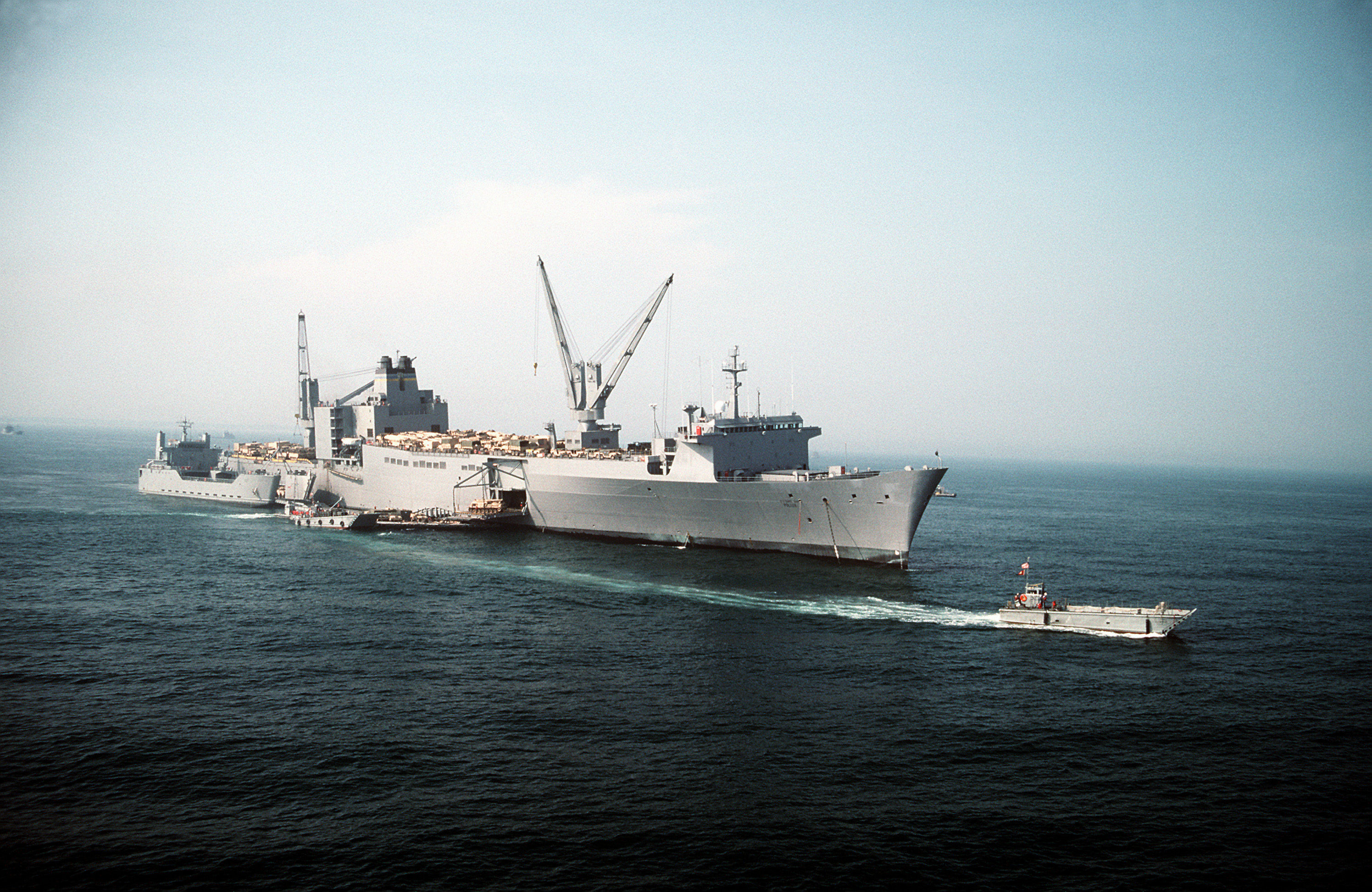
SS Pollux (T-AKR-290), a Algol-class vehicle cargo ship

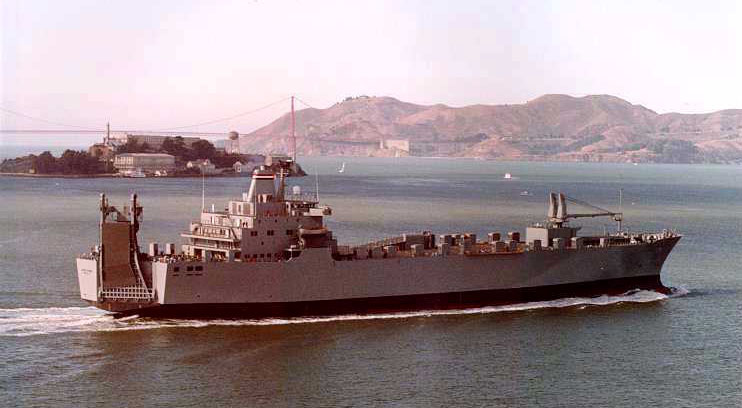
SS Cape Isabel (T-AKR-5062), a Cape I-class vehicle cargo ship

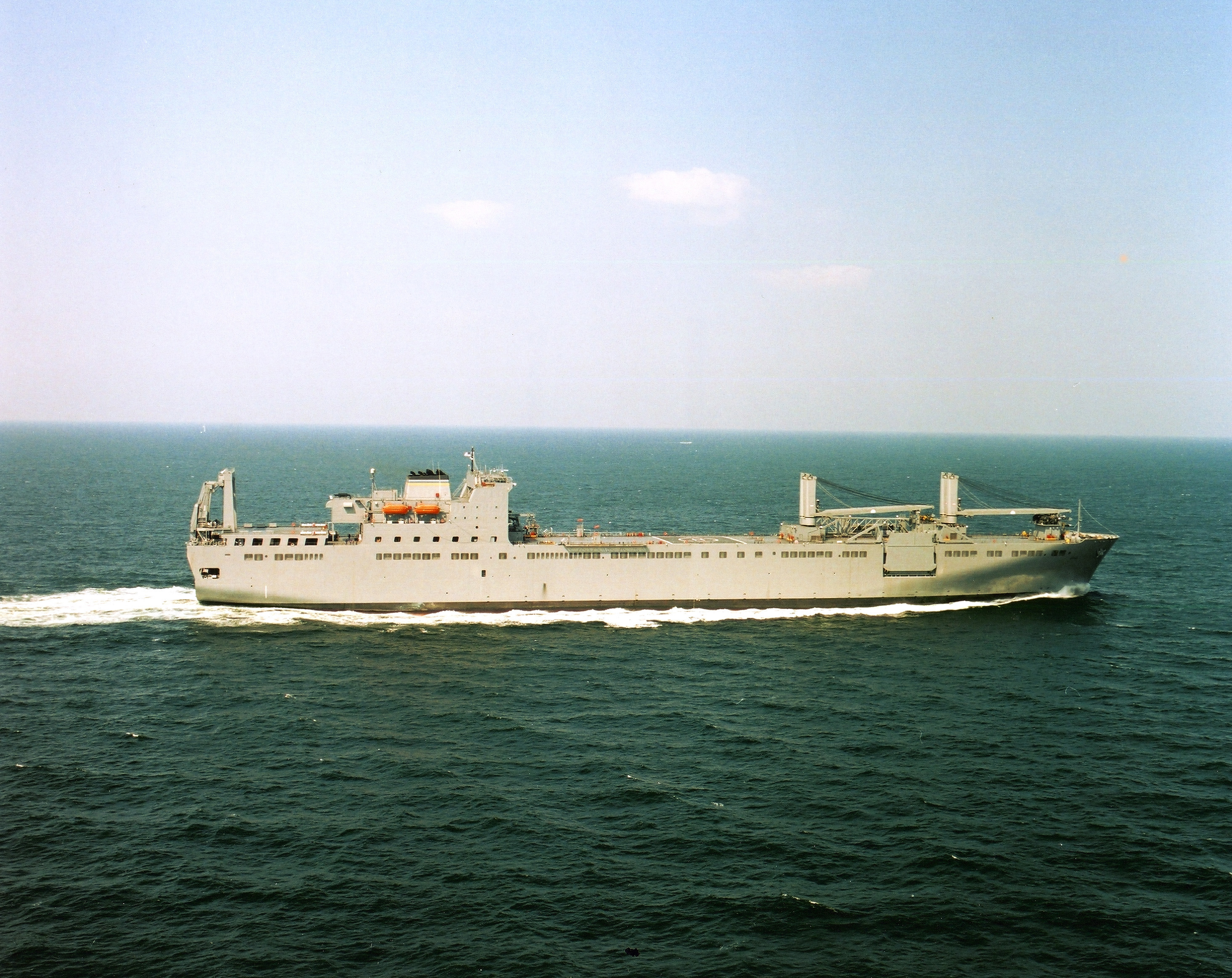
MV Roy P. Benavidez (T-AKR-306), a Bob Hope-class vehicle cargo ship

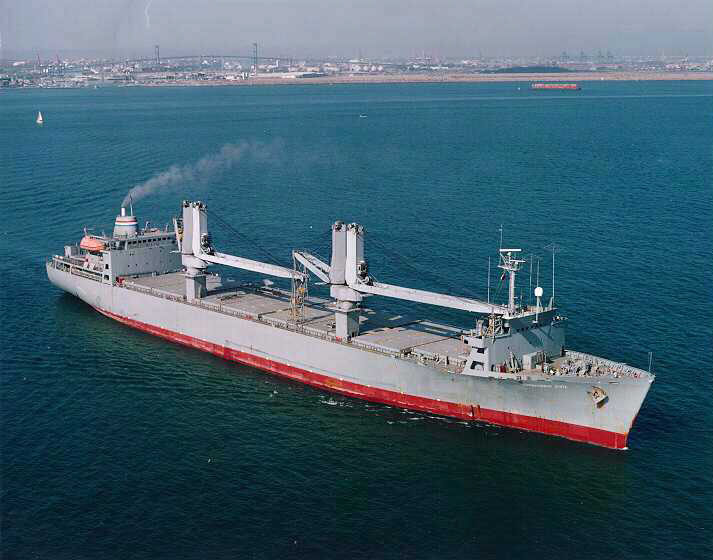
SS Cornhusker State (T-ACS-6), a Keystone State-class crane ship

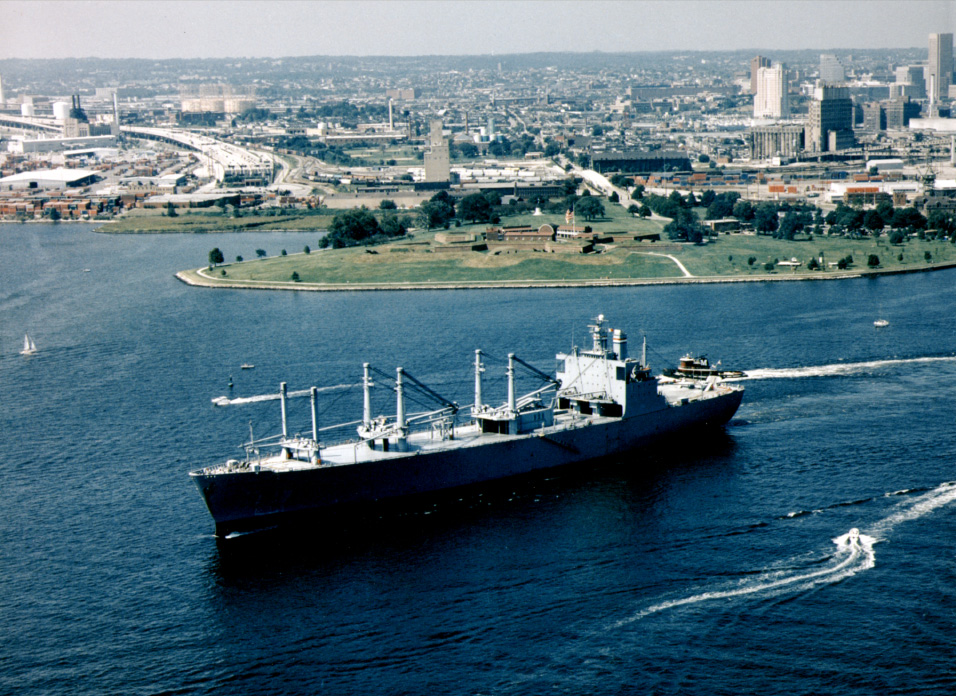
GTS Admiral W. M. Callaghan (T-AKR-1001), an O-class, gas turbine powered roll-on/roll-off cargo ship

Reserve fleet

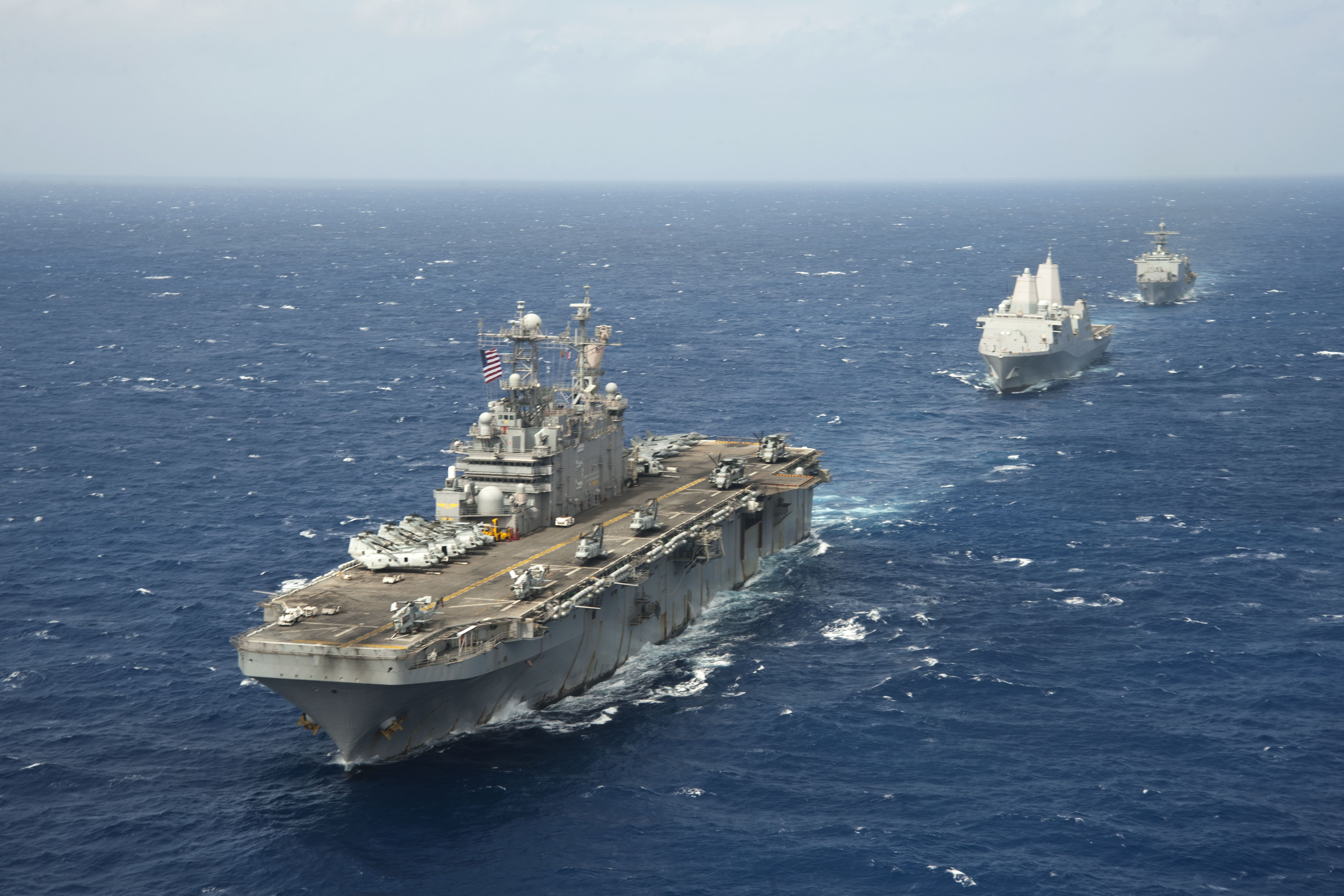
USS Peleliu (LHA-5), a Tarawa-class amphibious assault ship

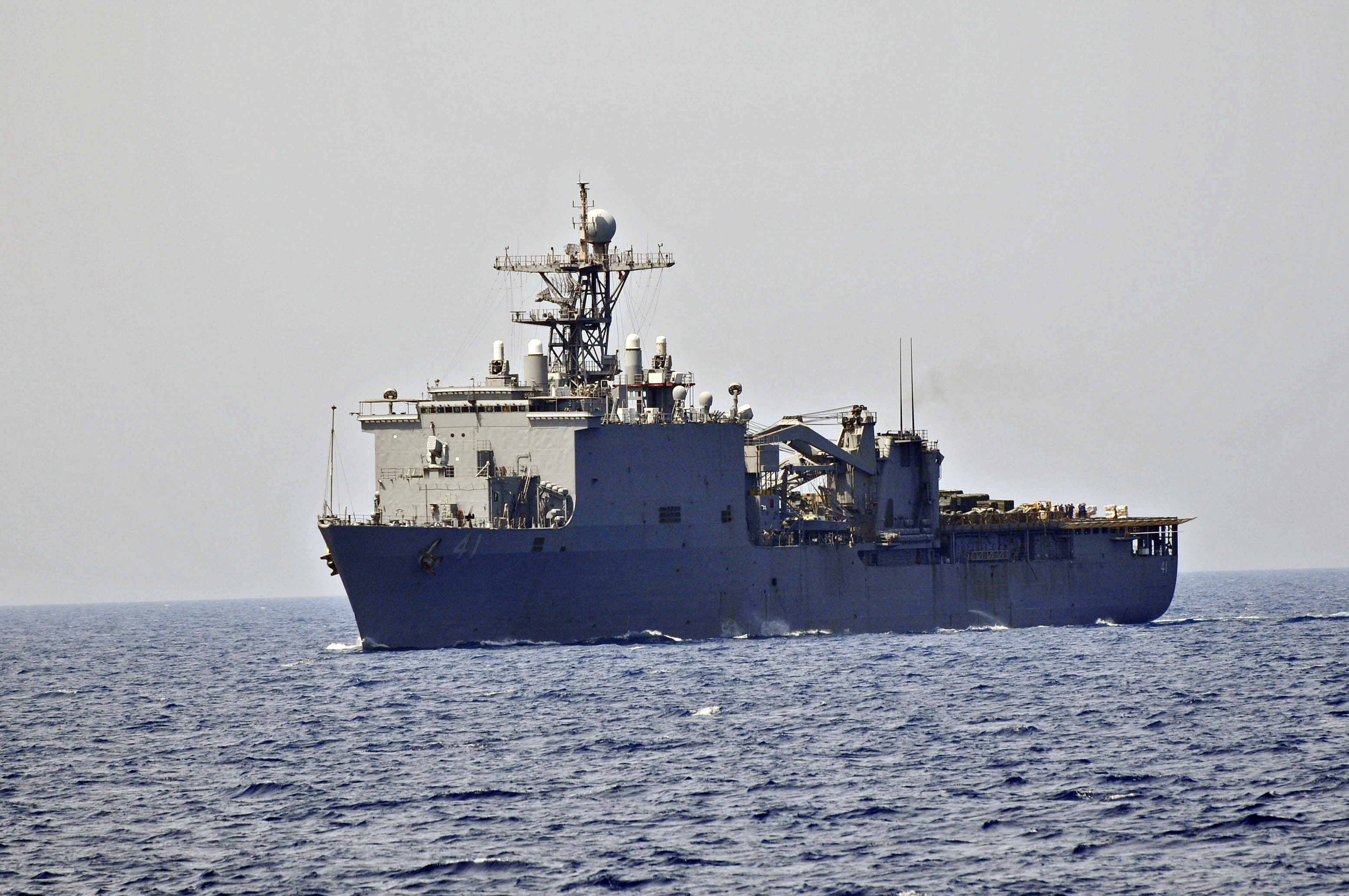
USS Whidbey Island (LSD-41), a dock landing ship and the lead ship of her class

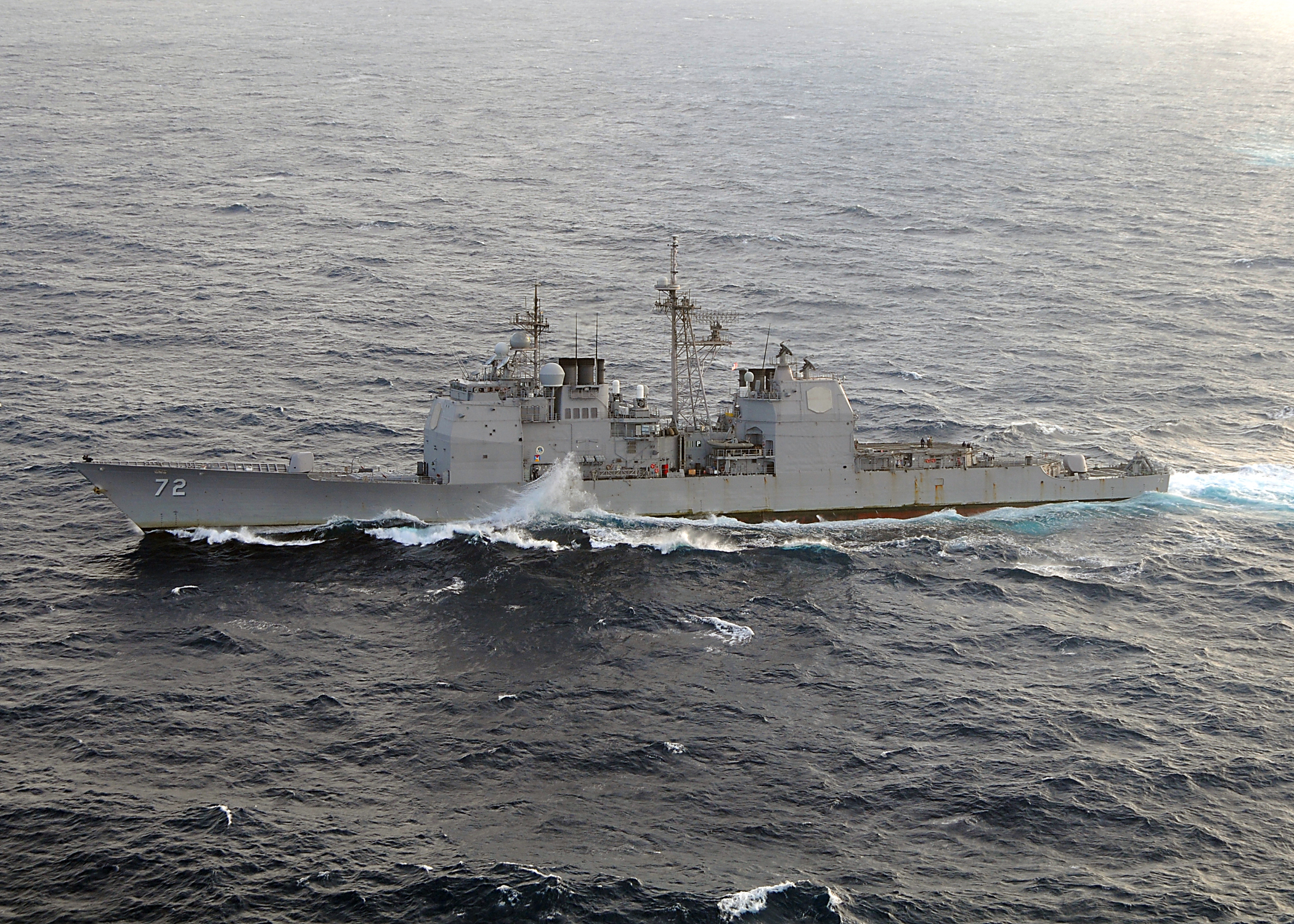
USS Vella Gulf (CG-72), a Ticonderoga-class cruiser

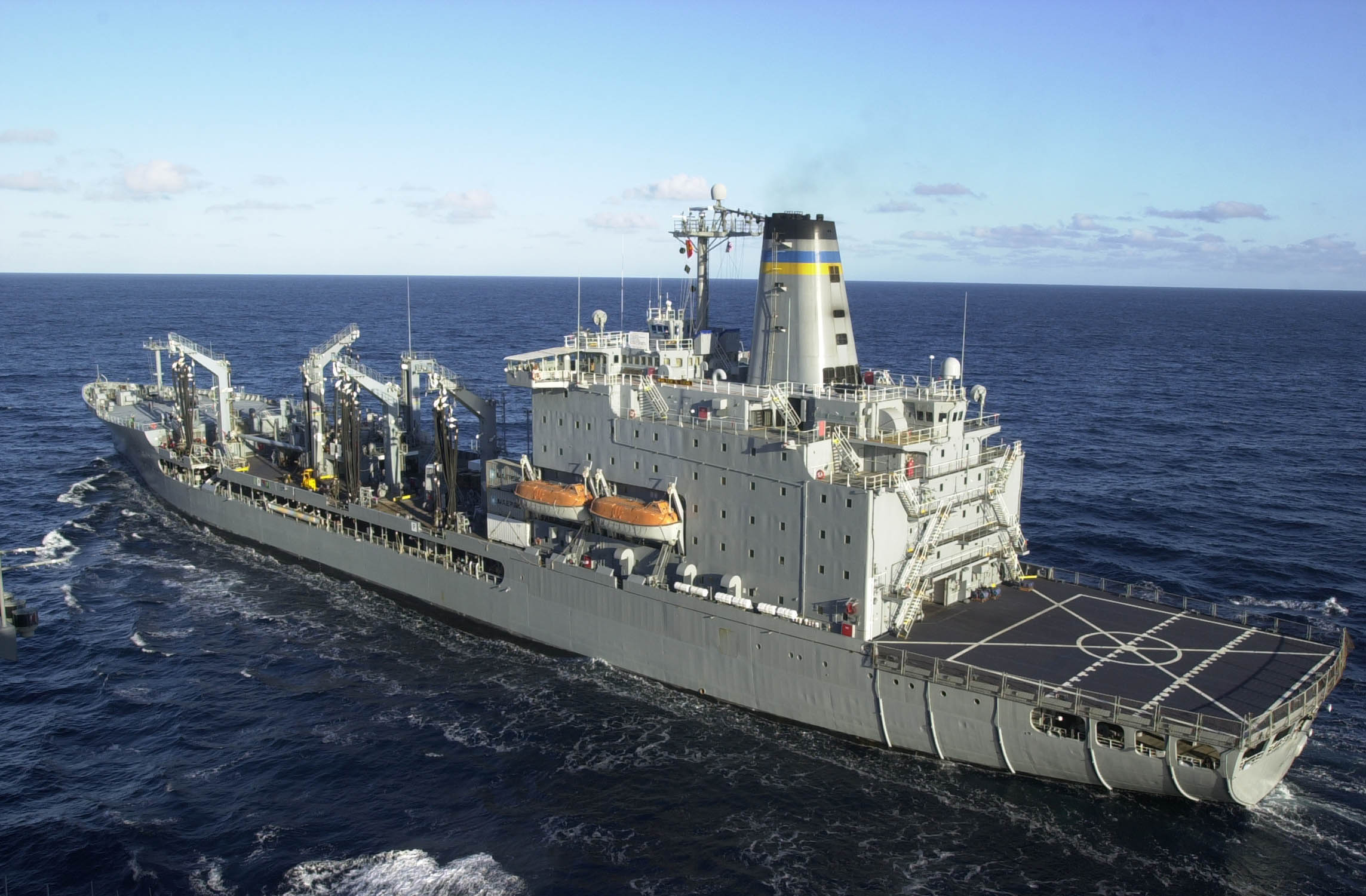
USNS Walter S. Diehl (T-AO-193), a Henry J. Kaiser-class replenishment oiler

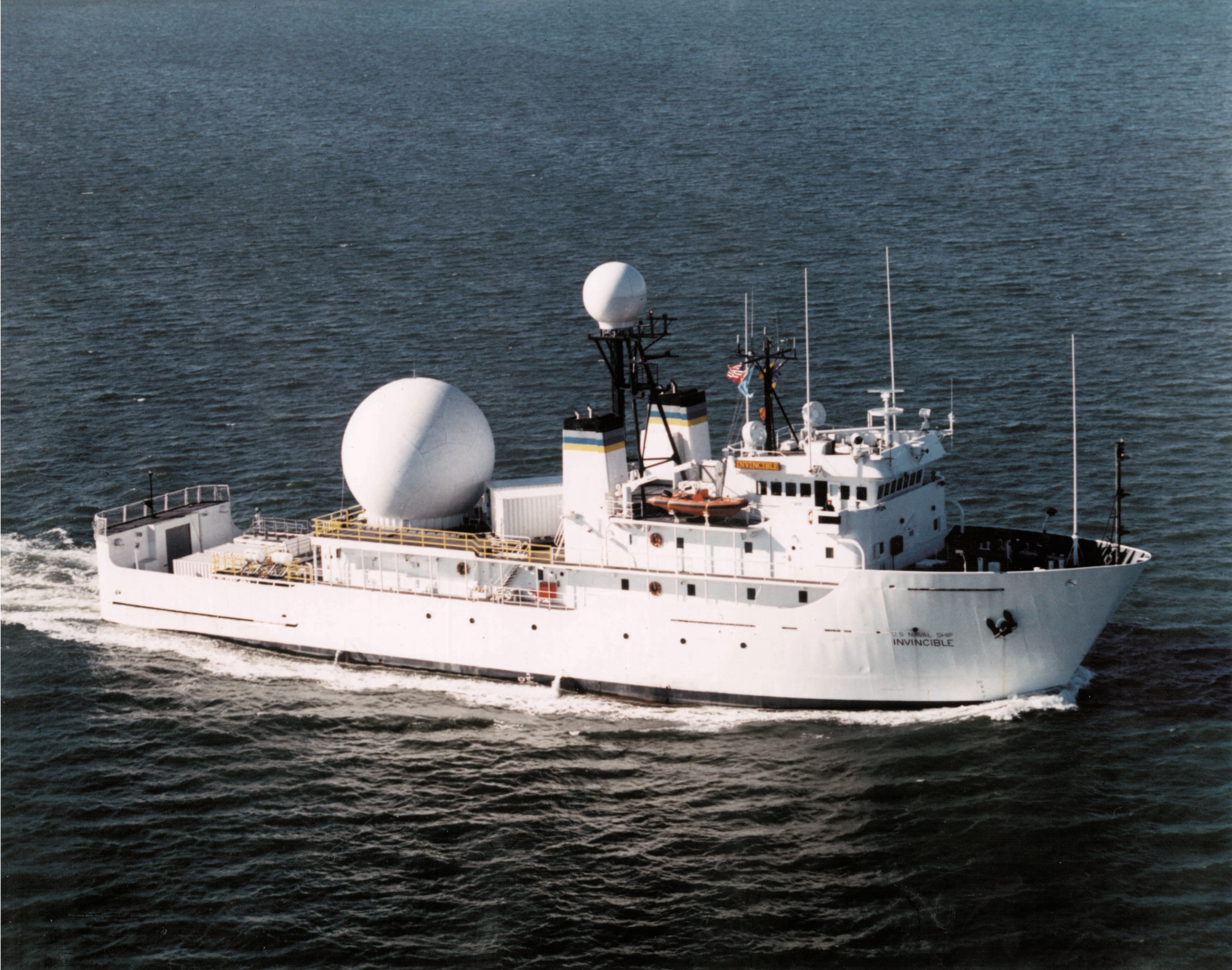
USNS Invincible (T-AGM-24), a Stalwart-class missile range instrumentation ship

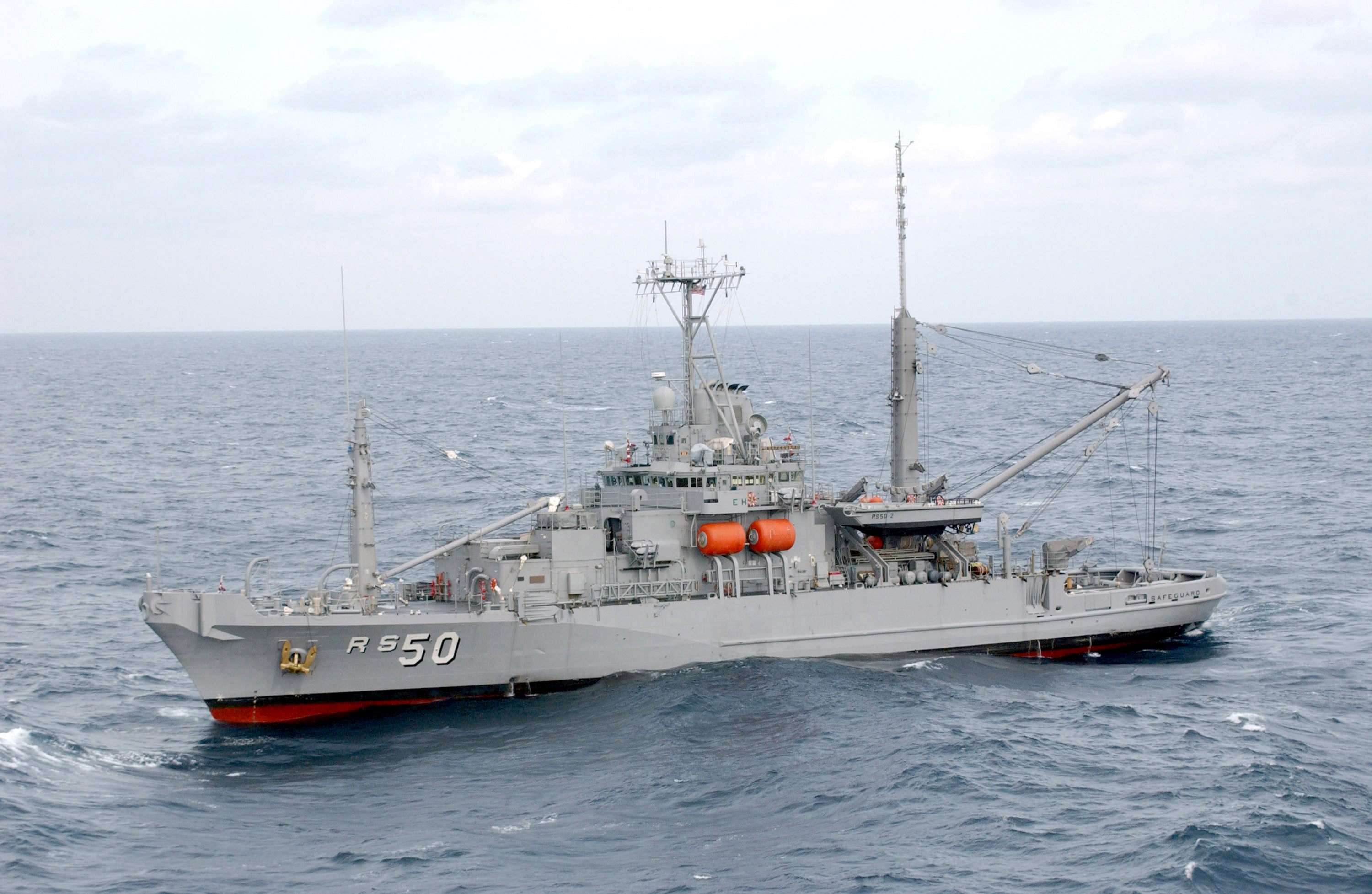
USNS Safeguard (T-ARS-50), a rescue and salvage ship and the lead ship of her class

Under construction

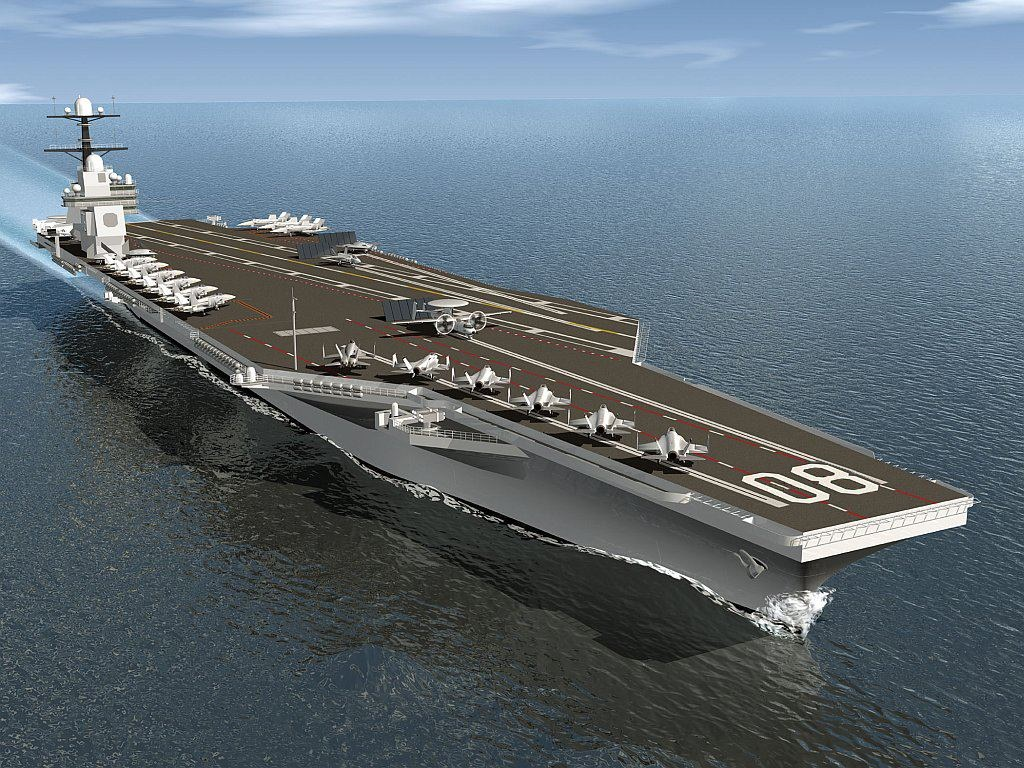
Artist's rendering of USS Enterprise (CVN-80), a Gerald R. Ford-class aircraft carrier currently under construction

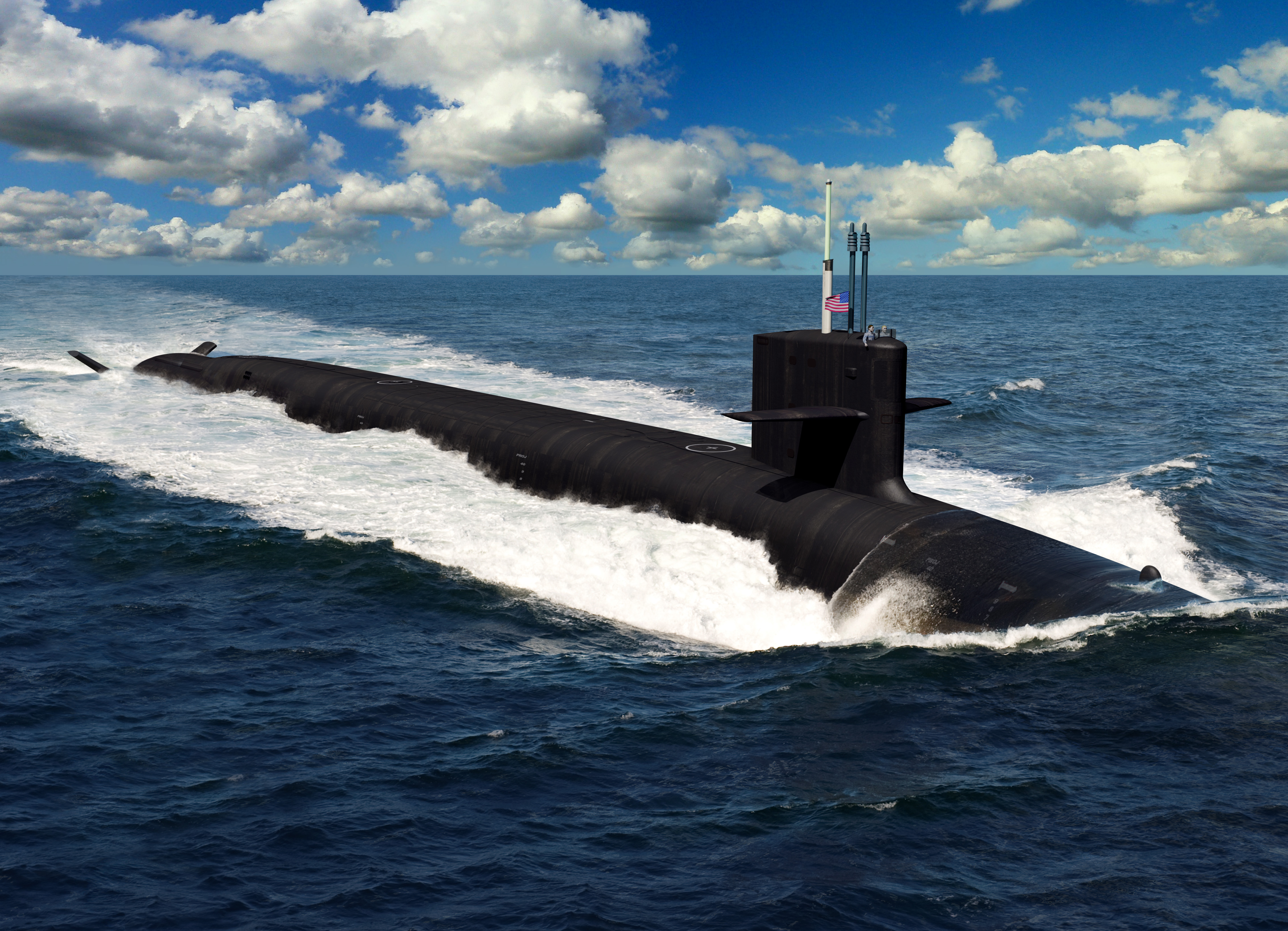
Artist's rendering of USS District of Columbia (SSBN-826), a nuclear-powered ballistic missile submarine currently under construction and the lead ship of her class

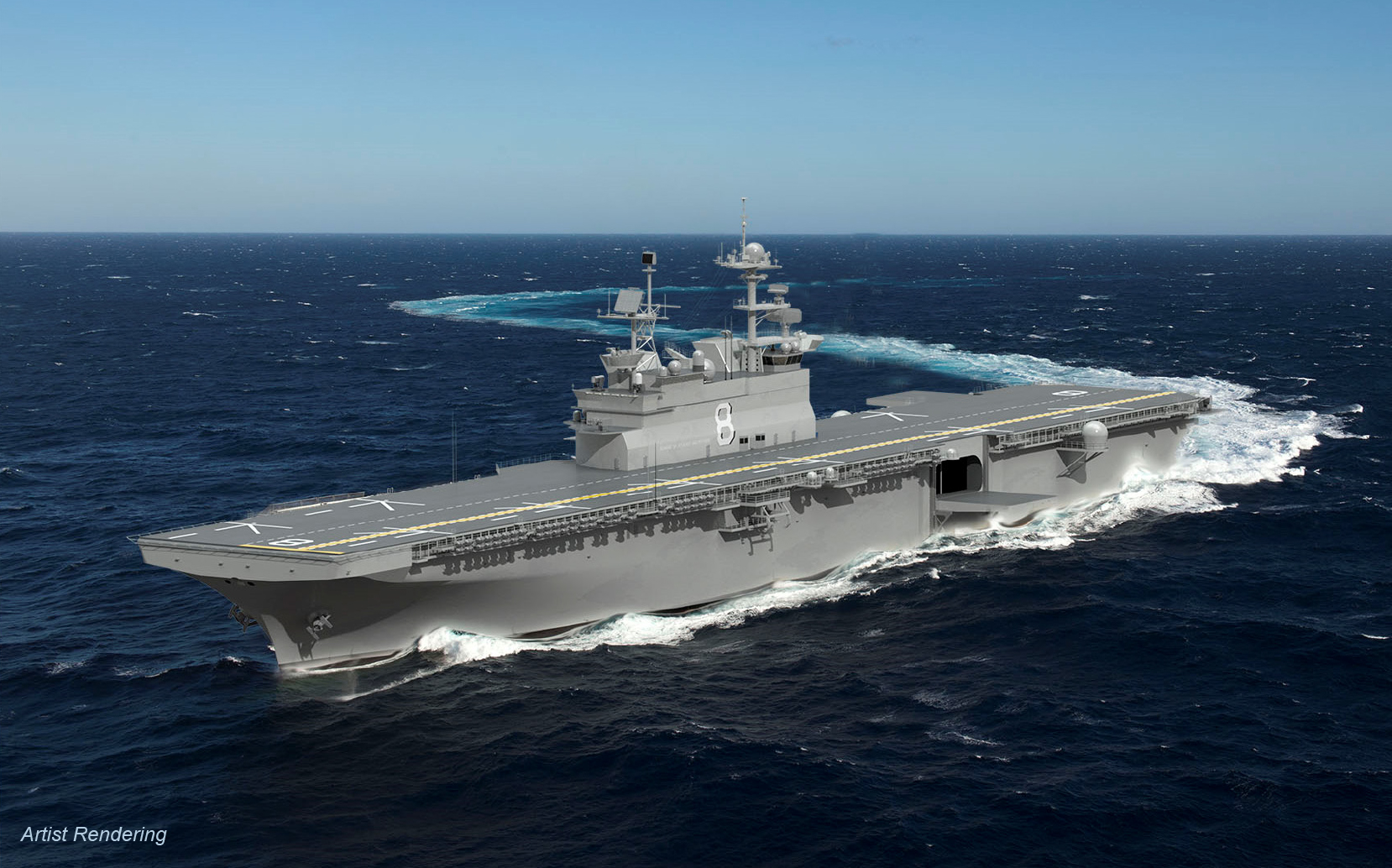
Artist's rendering of USS Bougainville (LHA-8), an America-class amphibious assault ship currently under construction

On order

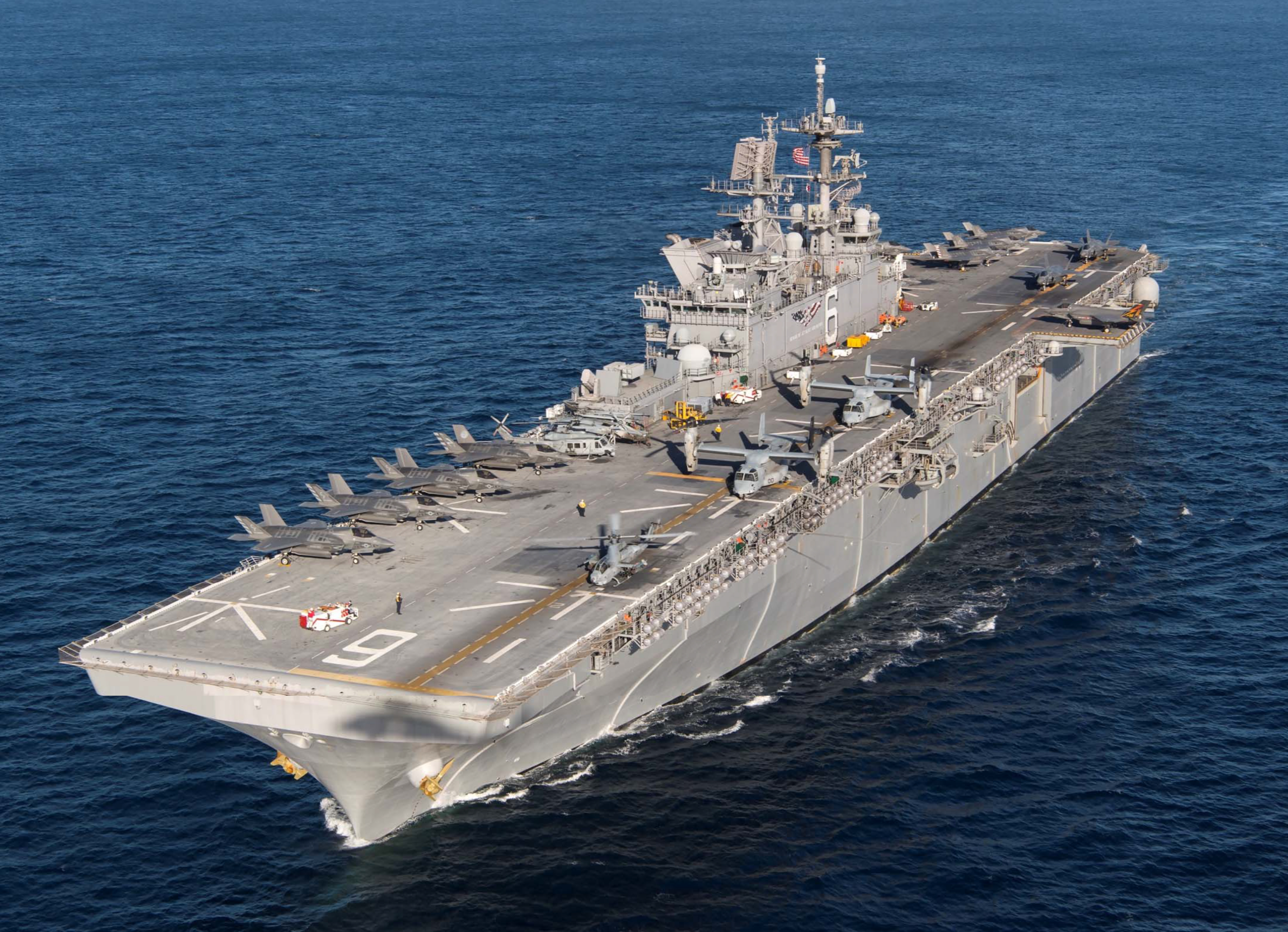
USS America (LHA-6), an amphibious assault ship and lead ship of her class, some of which are currently on order

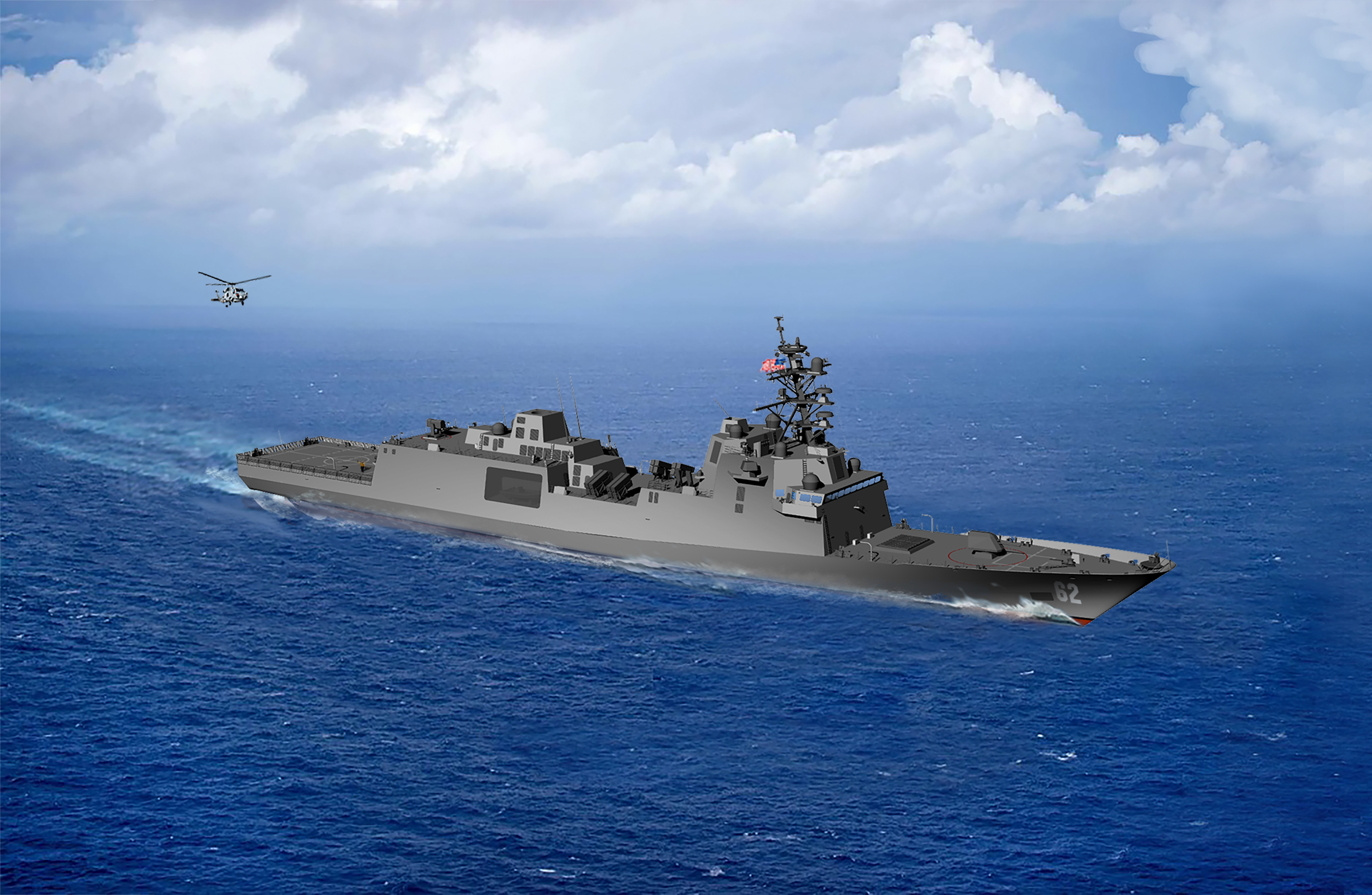
Artist's rendering of USS Constellation (FFG-62), a guided-missile frigate and the lead ship of her class, some of which are currently on order

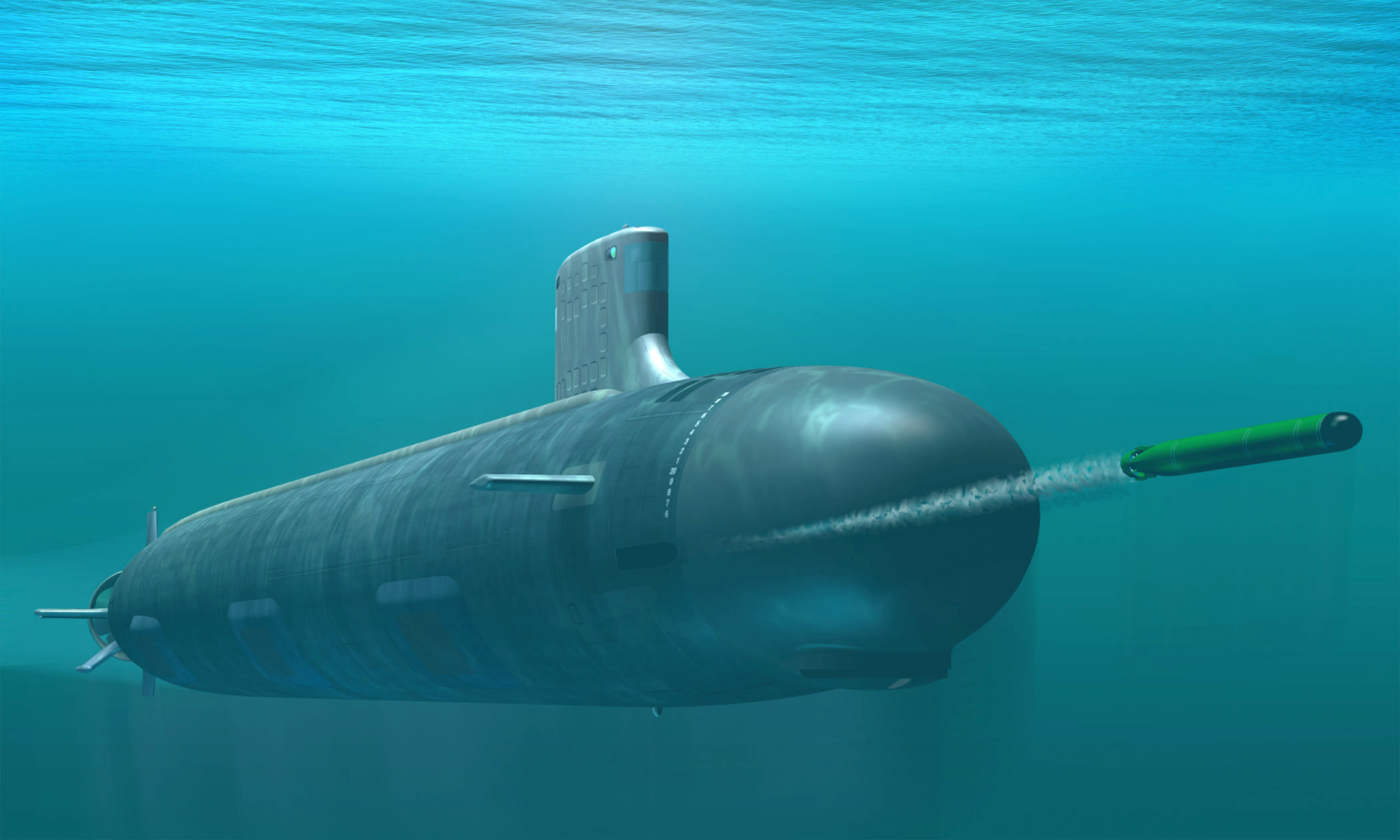
Artist's rendering of USS Virginia (SSN-774), a nuclear powered attack submarine and lead ship of her class, some of which are currently on order

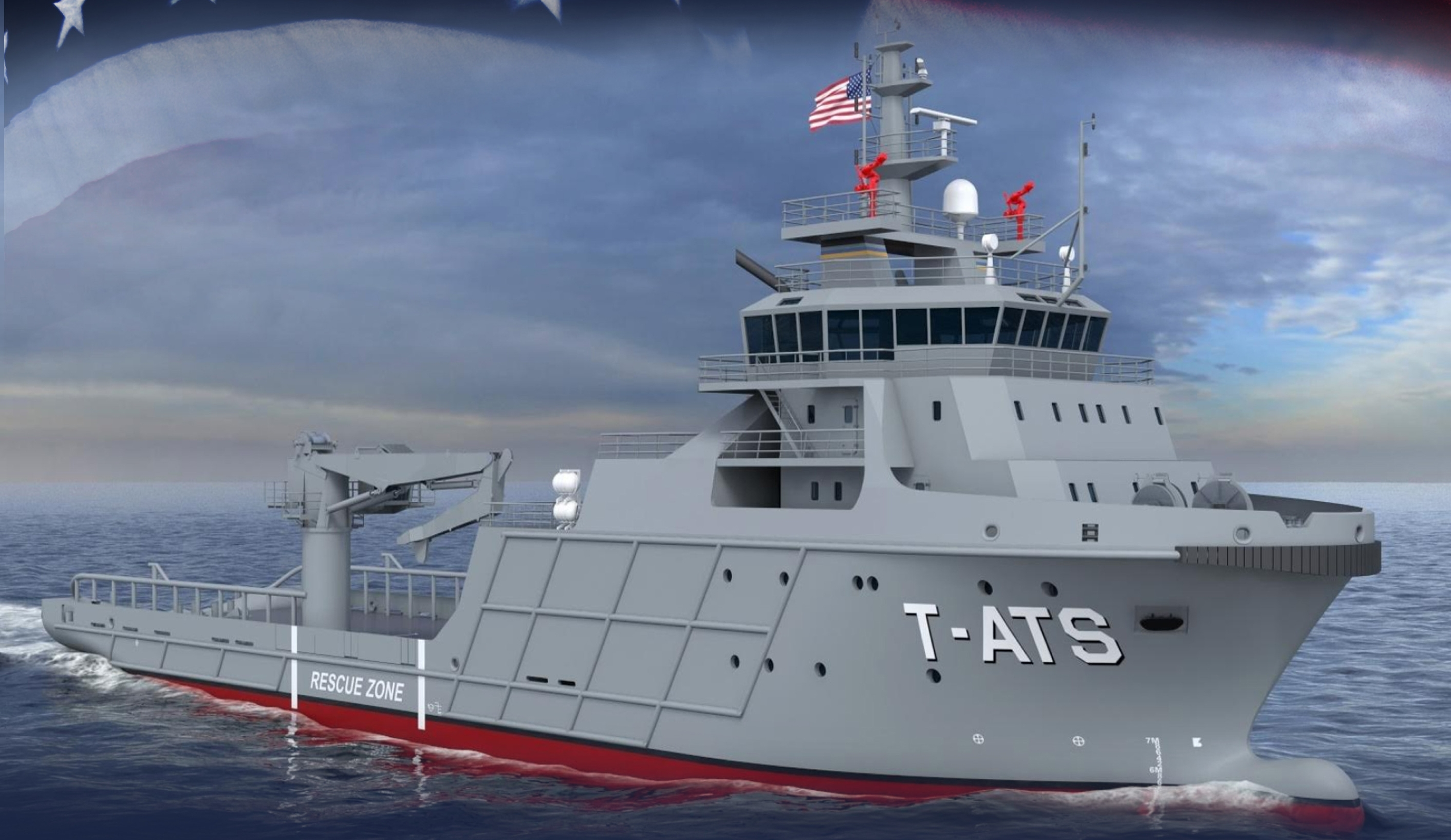
Artist's rendering of USNS Navajo (T-ATS-6), a rescue and salvage ship and lead ship of her class, some of which are currently on order

== See also ==
- History of the United States Navy
- List of currently active United States military watercraft
- List of equipment of the United States Armed Forces – Watercraft
- List of equipment of the United States Navy – Watercraft
- List of museum ships of the United States military
- List of ships of the United States Air Force
- List of ships of the United States Army
- List of United States Coast Guard cutters (includes current and former USCG Cutters)
- List of United States Navy ships (includes current and former USN ships)
- Mobile offshore base
- Strategic Sealift Ships
- Ship identifier
- United States Navy ships
- United States Merchant Marine
- United States ship naming conventions
