= List of Ready Reserve Force ships =

Ready Reserve Force (RRF) ships of the National Defense Reserve Fleet are owned, crewed, and maintained by the civilian United States Maritime Administration, but come under control of the Military Sealift Command when activated. The MSC Sealift Program's Surge Project Office is responsible for RRF activities.

== Ready Reserve Force ships ==
=== By location ===
==== Baltimore, MD ====
- SS Wright (T-AVB-3) – SS Wright is part of the RRF, but is dedicated to USMC aviation logistics support.
- MV Cape Wrath (T-AKR-9962)
- MV Cape Washington (T-AKR-9961)
- USNS Pomeroy (T-AKR-316)
- MV Charles L. Gilliland (T-AKR-298)
- MV Gary I Gordan (T-AKR-296)
- USNS Watson (T-AKR-310)

==== Beaumont Reserve Fleet ====
- MV Cape Victory (T-AKR-9701)
- MV Cape Vincent (T-AKR-9666)
- SS Antares (T-AKR-294)
- SS Denebola (T-AKR-289)

==== Charleston, SC ====
- MV Cape Ducato (T-AKR-5051)
- MV Cape Edmont (T-AKR-5069)
- MV Cape Diamond (T-AKR-5055)
- MV Cape Douglas (T-AKR-5052)
- MV Cape Domingo (T-AKR-5053)
- MV Cape Decision (T-AKR-5054)

==== Houston, TX ====
- MV Cape Taylor (T-AKR-113)
- MV Cape Texas (T-AKR-112)
- MV Cape Trinity (T-AKR-9711)

==== Long Beach, CA ====
- SS Cape Inscription (T-AKR-5076)
- SS Cape Isabel (T-AKR-5062)

==== Marrero, LA ====
- SS Altair (T-AKR-291)
- SS Bellatrix (T-AKR-288)

==== Newport News, VA ====
- SS Cornhusker State (T-ACS-6)
- SS Flickertail State (T-ACS-5)
- SS Gopher State (T-ACS-4)

==== New Orleans, LA ====
- MV Cape Kennedy (T-AKR-5083)
- MV Cape Knox (T-AKR-5082)

==== Norfolk, VA ====
- SS Cape May (T-AKR-5063)
- Maersk Peary (T-AOT 5246)

==== Oakland, CA ====
- GTS Adm Wm M. Callaghan (T-AKR-1001)
- MV Cape Orlando (T-AKR-2044)
- SS Gem State (T-ACS-2)
- SS Keystone State (T-ACS-1)
- SS Cape Mohican (T-AKR-5065)

==== Philadelphia, PA ====
- SS Pollux (T-AKR-290)
- SS Regulus (T-AKR-292)

==== Portsmouth, VA ====
- MV Cape Race (T-AKR-9960)
- MV Cape Ray (T-AKR-9679)
- MV Cape Rise (T-AKR-9678)

==== Vancouver, WA ====
- SS Curtiss (T-AVB-4) – SS Curtiss is part of the RRF, but is dedicated to USMC aviation logistics support under the Prepositioning Program.

==== San Francisco, CA ====
- MV Cape Henry (T-AKR-5067)
- MV Cape Horn (T-AKR-5068)
- MV Cape Hudson (T-AKR-5066)
- SS Algol (T-AKR-287)
- SS Capella (T-AKR-293)

==== Tacoma, WA ====
- SS Cape Intrepid (T-AKR-11)
- SS Cape Island (T-AKR-10)

==== Extended operations – Far East ====
- MV Cape Jacob (T-AK-5029) – Cape Jacob is part of the RRF, but is activated for duty with the Prepositioning Program.

=== By classification ===
==== T-ACS ====
- SS Keystone State (T-ACS-1)
- SS Gem State (T-ACS-2)
- SS Grand Canyon State (T-ACS-3)
- SS Gopher State (T-ACS-4)
- SS Flickertail State (T-ACS-5)
- SS Cornhusker State (T-ACS-6)
- SS Diamond State (T-ACS-7)
- SS Equality State (T-ACS-8)
- SS Green Mountain State (T-ACS-9)
- SS Beaver State (T-ACS-10)

==== T-AG ====
USNS_VADM_K._R._Wheeler (T-AG-5001)

==== T-AK ====
- MV TSgt John A. Chapman (T-AK 323)
- SS Cape Girardeau (T-AK-2039)
- MV Cpl Louis J. Hauge, Jr. (T-AK-3000)
- MV PFC William B. Baugh (T-AK-3001)
- MV PFC James Anderson Jr. (T-AK-3002)
- MV 1st Lt. Alex Bonnyman (T-AK-3003)
- MV Pvt. Franklin J. Phillips (T-AK-3004)
- SS Sgt Matej Kocak (T-AK-3005)
- SS PFC Eugene A. Obregon (T-AK-3006)
- SS Maj Stephen W. Pless (T-AK-3007)
- MV 2nd Lt John P. Bobo (T-AK-3008)
- MV PFC Dewayne T. Williams (T-AK-3009)
- MV 1st Lt Baldomero Lopez (T-AK-3010)
- USNS 1st Lt Jack Lummus (T-AK-3011)
- MV Sgt William R. Button (T-AK-3012)
- USNS 1st Lt Harry L. Martin (T-AK-3015)
- USNS LCPL Roy M. Wheat (T-AK-3016)
- USNS GYSGT Fred W. Stockham (T-AK-3017)
- MV Capt. Steven L. Bennett (T-AK-4296)
- MV Maj Bernard F Fisher (T-AK-4396)
- MV LTC John U. D. Page (T-AK-4496)
- MV SSgt Edward A. Carter, Jr. (T-AK-4544)
- MV A1C William H. Pitsenbarger (T-AK-4638)
- MV American Tern (T-AK-4729)
- SS Cape Jacob (T-AK-5029)
- SS Cape Gibson (T-AK 5051)
- TS Enterprise (T-AK-5059)
- SS Cape Farewell (T-AK-5073)

==== T-AKR ====
- USNS Meteor (T-AKR-9)
- MV Cape Washington (T-AKR-9961)
- MV Cape Wrath (T-AKR-9962)

==== T-AOT ====
- MV Nodaway (T-AOT-78)
- SS Potomac (T-AOT-181)
- SS Mission Buenaventura (T-AOT-1012)
- MV Gus W. Darnell (T-AOT-1121)
- MV Mission Capistrano (T-AOT-5005)
- SS Mount Washington (T-AOT-5076)
- Maersk Peary (T-AOT 5246)

== See also ==
- List of Military Sealift Command ships
- List of auxiliaries of the United States Navy
- Strategic sealift ships
- United States Navy
