= National Defense Reserve Fleet =

United States Maritime Administration reserve fleet

Coordinates: 38.07161°N 122.09673°W

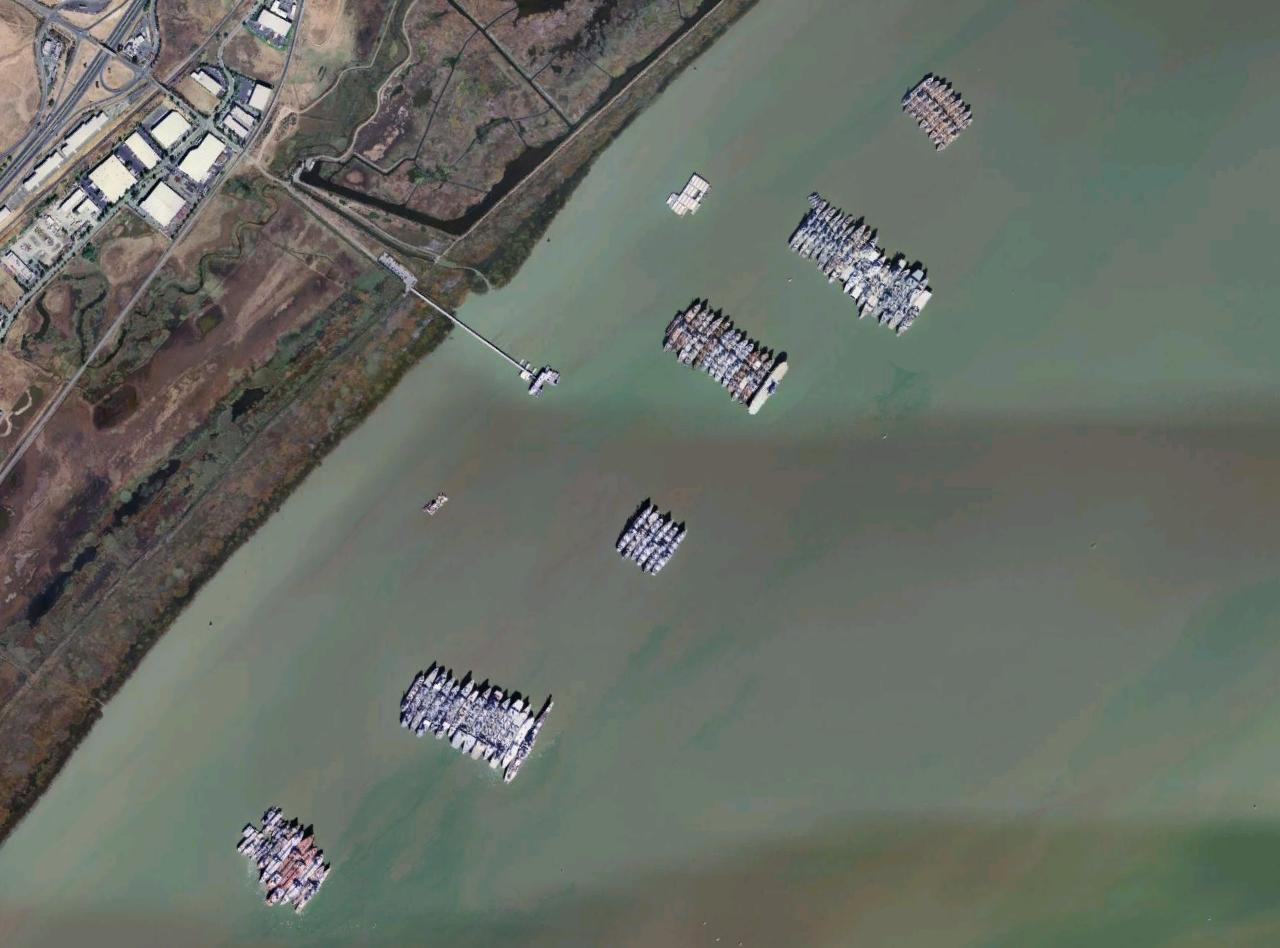
NDRF ships in Suisun Bay in San Francisco Bay

The National Defense Reserve Fleet (NDRF) consists of ships of the United States, mostly merchant vessels, that have been mothballed but can be activated within 20 to 120 days to provide shipping during national military emergencies, or non-military emergencies such as commercial shipping crises.

The NDRF is managed by the U.S. Department of Transportation's Maritime Administration (MARAD). It is distinct from the United States Navy reserve fleets, which consist largely of naval vessels.

NDRF vessels are at the fleet sites at James River, Virginia (James River Reserve Fleet); Beaumont, Texas (Beaumont Reserve Fleet); and Suisun Bay, California (Suisun Bay Reserve Fleet); and at designated outported berths. Former anchorage sites included Stony Point, New York (Hudson River Reserve Fleet); Wilmington, North Carolina; Mobile, Alabama; Astoria, Oregon; and Olympia, Washington.

Through the 2010s, the oldest, most decrepit hulls at Suisun Bay were stripped of toxic materials, then broken up in Texas, California, or Asia. Twenty of the most polluting mothball ships were recycled by 2012, and another 32 by 2017.

At its peak, in 1950, the NDRF had 2,277 ships in lay-up. In 2003, it had 274. In July 2007, it held 230 ships, primarily dry-cargo ships, with some tankers, military auxiliaries, and other types. In December 2021, the number of ships was down to 91.

== History ==
The NDRF was established under Section 11 of the Merchant Ship Sales Act of 1946 to serve as a reserve of ships for national defense and national emergencies.

NDRF vessels were used in seven wars and crises:

- During the Korean War, 540 vessels were broken out to move military forces.
- During a worldwide tonnage shortfall in 1951–53, more than 600 ships were reactivated to carry coal to Northern Europe and grain to India.
- From 1955 through 1964, another 600 ships were used to store grain for the Department of Agriculture.
- Another 223 cargo ships and 29 tankers were activated during a tonnage shortfall after the Suez Canal was closed in 1956.
- During the Berlin Crisis of 1961, 18 vessels were activated and remained in service until 1970.
- Another 172 vessels were activated for the Vietnam War.

=== Ready Reserve Force ===
In 1976, a Ready Reserve Force component was established as a subset of the NDRF to provide rapid deployment of military equipment and later became known as the Ready Reserve Force, which numbers 72 vessels. These are crewed with a reduced crew but kept available for activation within four, five, ten or twenty days.

An additional 28 ships are held under United States Maritime Administration (MARAD) custody for other government agencies on a cost-reimbursable basis.

== Operations ==
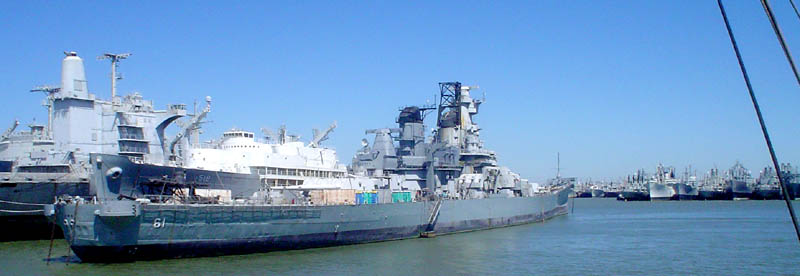
USS Iowa (BB-61) was in the custody of MARAD in the NDRF at Suisun Bay from 2001 to 2011.

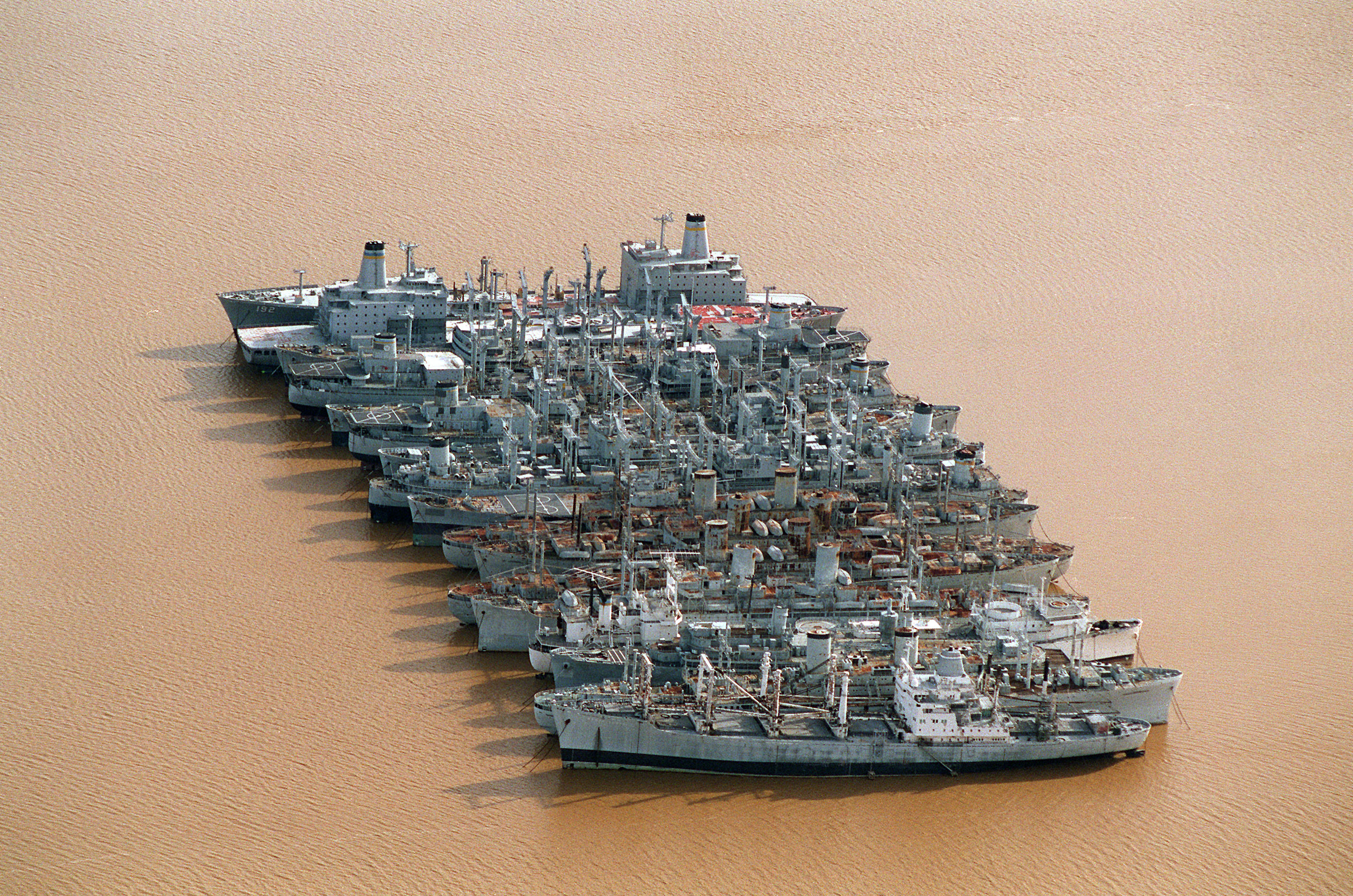
Inactive U.S. Navy auxiliary ships in the James River near Fort Eustis in Newport News, Virginia

Vessels with military utility or logistic value are held in retention status and are in a preservation program that is designed to keep them in the same condition as when they enter the fleet. The internal spaces are dehumidified to slow the corrosion of metal and the growth of mold and mildew. DC power is distributed through anodes to the exterior underwater portions of the hull, creating an electric field that suppresses corrosion and preserves the surface of the hull. External painting and other cosmetic work are generally deferred since they do not affect the ability to activate and operate the vessel.

MARAD is authorized as the government's disposal agent through the NDRF program for merchant type vessels equal to or greater than 1,500 gross tons. A state agency can file an application to request title to a vessel "as-is where-is" from the NDRF for the purpose of creating an artificial reef. A total of 51 vessels have been transferred to 10 states under the program including: Texas (12), Florida (10), North Carolina (7), Virginia (6), Alabama (5), Mississippi (5), Georgia (2), South Carolina (2), California (1), and New Jersey (1). Of the 132 non-retention vessels in the NDRF, there are 117 that are being prepared for disposal.

The NDRF program can give and lend historic artifacts to maritime-heritage organizations and transfer entire ships to memorial associations through special legislation.

Reserve Fleet Inactive naval ships of merchant design, including amphibious ships but not ships maintained in a mobilization status by MARAD for Military Sealift Command (MSC), may be laid up in the NDRF when overcrowded berthing conditions exist at a Navy Inactive Ship Maintenance Facility. Battleships, cruisers, and aircraft carriers which have been stricken or those awaiting final disposition may be transferred to MARAD locations for berthing. Initially, these ships will be transferred to MARAD for caretaking in accordance with the Economy Act of 1932.

Ships transferred to the NDRF may be retained in Navy Mobilization Plans and maintained by MARAD under priorities set by the Department of the Navy. If the Navy decides it no longer needs the ship, the Secretary of the Navy strikes the ship from the Naval Vessel Register and transfers the title to MARAD. When possible, MARAD gets first disposition rights, which allows it to convert merchant ships to the Ready Reserve Force (RRF) or to sell the ship for scrapping in connection with the Merchant Marine Act of 1936, Sec. 508, and use the proceeds to buy more supply ships.

== Fleet reduction ==
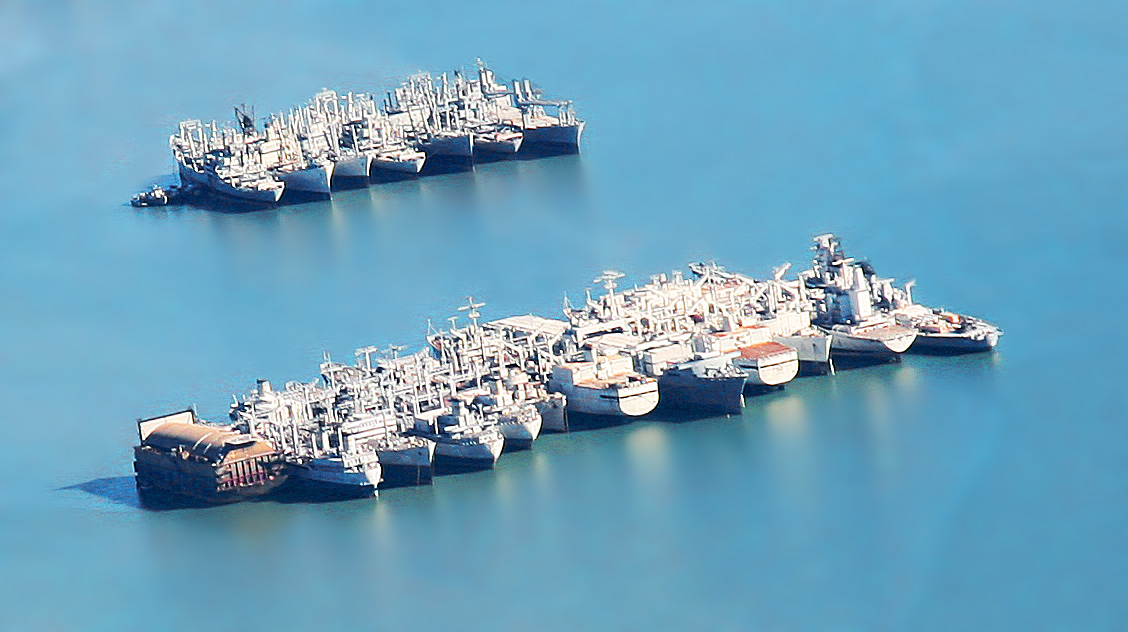
Mothballed ships in Suisun Bay in San Francisco Bay in 2010. The battleship USS Iowa can be seen at the far end of the first row, and the Hughes Mining Barge at the near end

The Suisun Bay location contained 324 ships in 1959. Forty years later, the number was down by about 250, but pollutants had begun to accumulate in the area. Paint containing toxins such as lead, copper, zinc and barium had been flaking off many of the ships' hulls and superstructures. By June 2007, some 21 tons of toxic paint debris was estimated to have been shed from the ships, to settle in the bay sediment. A further 65 tons of paint was estimated to be in danger of flaking off.

David Matsuda, acting administrator of MARAD, said in March 2010 "We are moving expeditiously to remove the worst-polluting ships first and diligently moving to clean the rest." Some 52 ships were identified as problematic, and were scheduled for removal and recycling by September 2017. The process began in October 2009; as of October 2012, 36 ships had been removed and the disposal effort was ahead of schedule. One such vessel, the SS Winthrop, the last Victory ship of the California mothball fleet, was towed in March 2010 to BAE Systems San Francisco Ship Repair dock to be cleaned of barnacles and plant matter before its final journey to ship breakers in Brownsville, Texas. The hull cleaning was prescribed by the U.S. Coast Guard to prevent the spread of California species to other locations. Some of the recycling work may be completed in the San Francisco Bay Area, specifically at the former Mare Island Naval Shipyard—an application for such work is under permit review. Some $38 million in federal funds will be used to complete the dismantling project.

== List of NDRF ships ==
As of August 2026:

Name	Division	Hull No.	Year built	Design	Home Port	Status
RRF - Roll-On/Roll-Off
Admiral W. M. Callaghan	Pacific	AKR 1001	1967	Gas Turbine	Oakland, CA	RRF
Bob Hope	Pacific	T-AKR 300	1997	LMSR	Portland, Or	RRF
Cape Cortes	Atlantic	AKR 5585	1997	Vehicle Carrier	Pascagoula, MS	RRF
Cape Decision	Atlantic	AKR 5054	1973	G1-Dsl/s	Charleston, SC	RRF
Cape Domingo	Atlantic	AKR 5053	1973	G1-Dsl/F	Charleston, SC	RRF
Cape Douglas	Atlantic	AKR 5052	1973	G1-Dsl/F	Charleston, SC	RRF
Cape Ducato	Atlantic	AKR 5051	1972	G1-Dsl/F	Charleston, SC	RRF
Cape Henry	Pacific	AKR 5067	1979	G2-Dsl/Japan	San Francisco, CA	RRF
Cape Horn	Pacific	AKR 5068	1979	G2-Dsl/N	San Francisco, CA	RRF
Cape Hudson	Pacific	AKR 5066	1979	G2-Dsl/N	San Francisco, CA	RRF
Cape Isabel	Pacific	AKR 5062	1976	C7-S-95a	Long Beach, CA	RRF
Cape Island	Pacific	T-AKR10	1977	C7-S-95a	Tacoma, WA	RRF
Cape Kennedy	Gulf	AKR 5083	1979	Dsl/Netherland	New Orleans, LA	RRF
Cape Knox	Gulf	AKR 5082	1978	Dsl/Netherland	New Orleans, LA	RRF
Cape Orlando	Pacific	AKR 2044	1981	Dsl/Sweden	Oakland, CA	RRF
Cape Race	Atlantic	AKR 9960	1977	Dsl/Japan	Portsmouth, VA	RRF
Cape Rise	Atlantic	AKR 9678	1977	Dsl/Japan	Portsmouth, VA	RRF
Cape Sable	Pacific	AKR 5586	2013	Vehicle carrier	Pier 80, San Francisco, CA	RRF
Cape San Juan	Pacific	AKR 5587	2012	Vehicle carrier	Pier 80, San Francisco, CA	RRF
Cape Starr	Atlantic	AKR 5588	2012	Vehicle carrier	Portsmouth, VA	RRF
Cape Taylor	Gulf	AKR 113	1977	Dsl/Japan	Port of Beaumont, TX	RRF
Cape Texas	Gulf	AKR 112	1977	Dsl/Japan	Port of Beaumont, TX	RRF
Cape Trinity	Gulf	AKR 9711	1977	Dsl/Germany	Port of Beaumont, TX	RRF
Cape Victory	Gulf	AKR 9701	1984	Dsl/Italy	BRF East Dock, Beaumont, TX	RRF
Cape Vincent	Gulf	AKR 9666	1984	Dsl/Italy	BRF East Dock, Beaumont, TX	RRF
Cape Washington	Atlantic	AKR 9961	1982	Dsl/Poland	Baltimore, MD	RRF
Cape Wrath	Atlantic	AKR 9962	1982	Dsl/Poland	Baltimore, MD	RRF
Charles L. Gilliland	Atlantic	T-AKR 298	1973	LMSR	Baltimore, MD	RRF
Conelius H. Charlton	Atlantic	T-AKR 314	1999	LMSR	Pier 8, Baltimore, MD	RRF
Fisher	Pacific	T-AKR 301	1997	LMSR	Portland, OR	RRF
Gary I. Gordon	Atlantic	T-AKR 296	1973	LMSR	Baltimore, MD	RRF
George Watson	Atlantic	T-AKR 310	1999	LMSR	Baltimore, MD	RRF
Leroy A. Mendonca	Atlantic	T-AKR 303	2001	LMSR	Newport News Marine Terminal, VA	RRF
Nelson V. Brittin	Pacific	T-AKR 305	1999	LMSR	San Francisco, CA	RRF
Roy P. Benavidez	Gulf	T-AKR 306	1997	LMSR	Newport News Marine Terminal, VA	RRF
Watkins	Pacific	T-AKR 315	1999	LMSR	Vancouver, WA	RRF
Soderman	Gulf	T-AKR 317	2002	LMSR	Marrero, LA	RRF
RRF - Crane Ship
Cornhusker State	Atlantic	T-ACS 6	1969	C5-S-MA73c	Newport News, VA	RRF
Gem State	Pacific	T-ACS 2	1966	C6-S-MA1qd	Oakland, CA	RRF
Gopher State	Atlantic	T-ACS4	1972	C5-S-MA73c	Newport News, VA	RRF
Keystone State	Pacific	T-ACS 1	1966	C6-S-MA1qd	Oakland, CA	RRF
RRF - Break Bulk
Curtiss	Pacific	T-AVB 4	1969	C5-S-78a	Vancouver, WA	RRF
Wright	Atlantic	T-AVB 3	1970	C5-S-78a	Norfolk, VA	RRF
Retention - Tanker
VADM K. R. Wheeler	Gulf	T-AG 5001	2006	Offshore Petroleum Discharge Ship	BRF, Beaumont, TX	Interim Hold
Retention - Special Purpose Ship
Empire State	HQ	NSMV-1	2023	NSMV	New York Maritime Academy, Ft. Schuyler, NY	School Ship
Patriot State	HQ	NSMV-2	2024	NSMV	Massachusetts Maritime Academy	School Ship
State of Maine	HQ	NSMV-3	2026	NSMV	Maine Maritime Academy	School Ship
Lone Star State	HQ	NSMV-4	2026	NSMV	Texas A&M Maritime Academy	School Ship
Retention - Roll-On/RollOff
Cape Arundel	Gulf	AKR 5584	1997	Vehicle Carrier	Pascagoula, MS	RRF
Cape Diamond	Atlantic	AKR 5055	1972	G1-Dsl/F	JRRF, Ft. Eustis, VA	Logistics Support
Cape Intrepid	Gulf	T-AKR11	1976	C7-S-95a	BRF, Beaumont, TX	Logistics Support
Cape Ray	Atlantic	AKR 9679	1977	Dsl/Japan	JRRF, Ft. Eustis, VA	Logistics Support
Cape San Roman	Atlantic	AKR 5589	2015	Vehicle carrier	Lambert’s Point, VA	RRF
Cape Suarez Point	Atlantic	STX S3030	2014	Vehicle carrier	Lambert’s Point, VA	RRF
Retention - Public Nautical School Ship
Freedom Star	Atlantic	7925314	1981	Research Vessel	Piney Point, MD	School Ship
General Rudder	Atlantic	T-AGOS 2	1984	AGOS-1	BRF, Beaumont, TX	School Ship
Golden Bear	Pacific	T-AGS 39	1971	S4-M-MA154a	Vallejo, CA	School Ship
Kennedy	Atlantic	T-AK 5059	1967	S5-S-MA66b	BRF, Beaumont, TX	Logistics Support
Kings Pointer	Atlantic	7925302	1981	Research	Kings Point, NY	School Ship
State of Michigan	Gulf	T-AGOS 6	1985	Navy OcnSurv	Traverse City, MI	School Ship
Retention - Other
Choctaw County	Atlantic	T-EPF 2	2012	High Speed Catamaran	JRRF, Ft. Eustis, VA	Interim hold
Pacific Collector	Pacific	T-AGS 29	1970	S3-M-MA-153c	Portland, OR	Other Agency Use
Pacific Tracker	Pacific	MA #144	1965	S6-S-MA60e	Portland, OR	Other Agency Use
Zera L. Tanner	Atlantic	T-AGS 40	1989	S4-M-MA154b	MHI Ship Repair, Norfolk, VA	Logistics Support
Retention - Barge
FB-62 (APL BARGE)	Pacific	APL-24	1944	Barracks CRF	SBRF, Benicia, CA	Fleet Support
Retention - Crane Ship
Flickertail State	Atlantic	T-ACS 5	1967	C5-S-MA73c	JRRF, Ft. Eustis, VA	Logistics Support
Grand Canyon State	Pacific	T-ACS 3	1965	C6-s-MA1qd	SBRF, Benicia, CA	Logistics Support
Retention - Break Bulk
Cape Ann	Atlantic	AK 5009	1962	C4-S-58a	JRRF, Ft. Eustis, VA	Training Use
Cape Avinoff	Atlantic	AK 5013	1963	C4-S-58a	JRRF, Ft. Eustis, VA	Training Use
Cape Chalmers	Atlantic	AK 5036	1963	C3-S-37c	Charleston, SC	Other Agency Use
Del Monte	Atlantic	MA 200	1968	C3-S-76a	Little Creek, VA	Other Agency Use
Savannah	Atlantic	55	1962	P2-N1-MA40a	Baltimore, MD	National Register
Non-retention - Other
Fall River	Gulf	T-EPF 4	2014	High Speed Catamaran	BRF, Beaumont, TX	Disposal
Invincible	Atlantic	T-AGM 24	1987	AGOS-1	JRRF, Ft. Eustis, VA	Disposal
Zeus	Atlantic	T-ARC 7	1982	Cable Repair	JRRF, Ft. Eustis, VA	Disposal
Non-retention - Crane Ship
Diamond State	Gulf	T-ACS 7	1960	C6-S-MA1xb	BRF, Beaumont, TX	Disposal
Green Mountain State	Pacific	T-ACS 9	1965	C6-S-MA60d	SBRF, Benicia, CA	Disposal
Non-retention - Break Bulk
Cape Bover	Pacific	AK 5057	1966	C4-S-66a	SBRF, Benicia, CA	Disposal
Cape Jacob	Pacific	T-AK 5029	1961	C4-S-1u	SBRF, Benicia, CA	Disposal
Non-retention Barge Ship
Cape Fear	Pacific	AK 5061	1971	C8-S-81b	SBRF, Benicia, CA	Disposal
Cape May	Gulf	AKR 5063	1973	C8-S-82a	BRF, Beaumont, TX	Disposal
Cape Mohican	Gulf	AKR 5065	1973	C8-S-82a	BRF, Beaumont, TX	Disposal
Non-retention - Roll-On/Roll-Off
1st Lt. Baldomero Lopez	Atlantic	T-AKR 3010	1985	RORO Combination	JRRF, Ft. Eustis, VA	Disposal
Algol	Gulf	T-AKR 287	1972	Navy Cargo	BRF, Beaumont, TX	Disposal
Antares	Gulf	T-AKR 294	1973	Navy Cargo	BRF, Beaumont, TX	Disposal
Capella	Gulf	T-AKR 293	1972	FSS/SL7	BRF, Beaumont, TX	Disposal
Denebola	Gulf	T-AKR 289	1973	FSS/SL7	BRF East Dock, Beaumont, TX	Disposal
Cape Edmont	Atlantic	AKR 5069	1971	G0-Dsl/S	JRRF, Ft. Eustis, VA	Disposal
Cape Inscription	Gulf	AKR 5076	1976	C7-S-95a	BRF East Dock, Beaumont, TX	Disposal
Pollux	Gulf	T-AKR 290	1973	FSS/SL7	BRF East Dock, Beaumont, TX	Disposal
Regulus	Gulf	T-AKR 292	1972	FSS/SL7	BRF East Dock, Beaumont, TX	Disposal
Shughart	Gulf	T-AKR 295	1980	Navy Cargo	BRF East Dock, Beaumont, TX	Disposal
Yano	Gulf	T-AKR 297	1980	Navy Cargo	BRF East Dock, Beaumont, TX	Disposal
Non-retention - Barge
Peach	Pacific	FB-63	1945	Repair barge	SBRF, Benicia, CA	Disposal
Custody - Tanker
John Ericsson	Atlantic	T-AO 194	1989	Fleet Replenishment Oiler	JRRF, Ft. Eustis, VA	Navy
Pecos	Atlantic	T-AO 197	1990	Fleet Replenishment Oiler	JRRF, Ft. Eustis, VA	Navy
Custody - Other
LCS(L)(3)-102	Pacific	LCS(L)-102	1945	Landing Craft Support	SBRF, Benicia, CA	National Registry
Polar Sea	Pacific	WAGB-11	1977	Polar Ice Breaker	SBRF, Benicia, CA	USCG
Custody - Military
Spearhead	Gulf	T-EPF 1	2010	High Speed Catamaran	BRF, Beaumont, TX	Navy
Millinocket	Pacific	T-EPF 3	2013	High Speed Catamaran	SBRF, Benicia, CA	Navy

== See also ==
- Reserve fleet
- Suisun Bay Reserve Fleet
- United States Navy reserve fleets
- U.S. Merchant Marine Academy
- Ready Reserve Fleet Alameda
