= Beaumont Reserve Fleet =

Reserve Fleet in Texas

Coordinates: 30°1′30″N 94°0′39″W

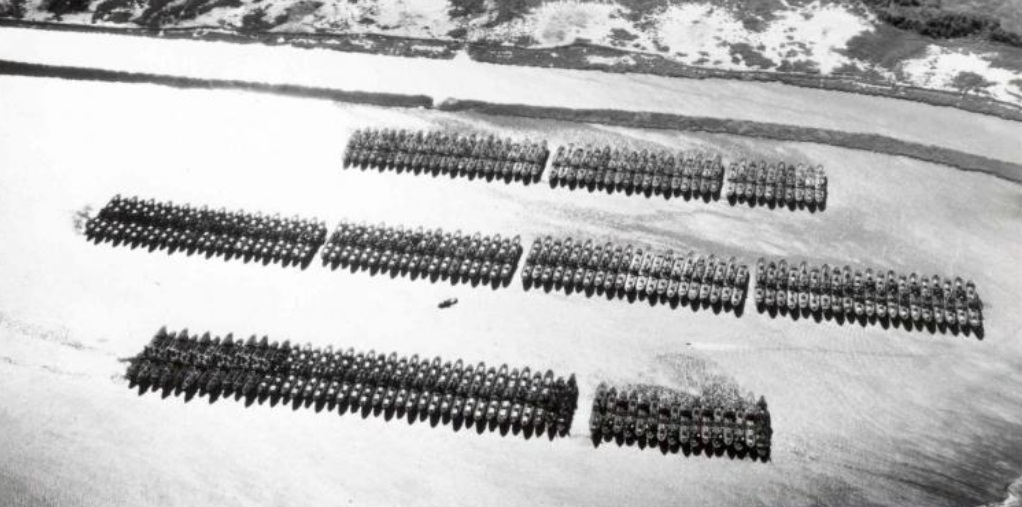
Beaumont Reserve Fleet in 1947

The Beaumont Reserve Fleet, was established by act of Congress in 1946, as a component of the National Defense Reserve Fleet (NDRF). The fleet is located in Beaumont, Texas.

== History ==
In 1946, the US Government excavated 24 million cubic yards of soil from the Neches River, southeast of Beaumont, to create the McFadden Bend Cutoff. This is the location of the fleet. The Neches River connects to Sabine Lake and then the Gulf of Mexico.

The Beaumont Reserve Fleet is one of only three remaining National Defense Reserve Fleets, of the original eight NDRFs, and the only anchorage on the Gulf Coast. The fleet is maintained by the Maritime Administration (MARAD), an agency of the Department of Transportation (DOT).

The other Reserve Fleets are the Suisun Bay Reserve Fleet inland from San Francisco Bay and the James River Reserve Fleet in Virginia.

== Inventory ==
As of November 2025:

Name	Division	Hull No.	Year built	Design	Home Port	Status
RRF - Roll-On/Roll-Off
Cape Taylor	Gulf	AKR 113	1977	Dsl/Japan	Port of Beaumont, TX	RRF
Cape Texas	Gulf	AKR 112	1977	Dsl/Germany	Port of Beaumont, TX	RRF
Cape Trinity	Gulf	AKR 9711	1977	Dsl/Germany	Port of Beaumont, TX	RRF
Cape Victory	Gulf	AKR 9701	1984	Dsl/Italy	BRF East Dock, Beaumont, TX	RRF
Cape Vincent	Gulf	AKR 9666	1984	Dsl/Italy	BRF East Dock, Beaumont, TX	RRF
Retention - Roll-On/Roll-Off
Cape Intrepid	Gulf	T-AKR11	1976	C7-S-95a	BRF, Beaumont, TX	Logistics Support
Retention - Public Nautical School Ship
General Rudder	Gulf	T-AGOS 2	1984	AGOS-1	BRF, Beaumont, TX	School Ship
Kennedy	Gulf	T-AK 5059	1967	S5-S-MA66b	BRF, Beaumont, TX	Logistics Support
Non-retention - Crane Ship
Diamond State	Gulf	T-ACS 7	1960	C6-S-MA1xb	BRF, Beaumont, TX	Disposal
Non-retention - Roll-On/Roll-Off
Algol	Gulf	T-AKR 287	1972	Navy Cargo	BRF, Beaumont, TX	Disposal
Antares	Gulf	T-AKR 294	1973	Navy Cargo	BRF, Beaumont, TX	Disposal
Capella	Gulf	T-AKR 293	1972	FSS/SL7	BRF, Beaumont, TX	Disposal
Denebola	Gulf	T-AKR 289	1973	FSS/SL7	BRF East Dock, Beaumont, TX	Disposal
Pollux	Gulf	T-AKR 290	1973	FSS/SL7	BRF East Dock, Beaumont, TX	Disposal
Regulus	Gulf	T-AKR 292	1972	FSS/SL7	BRF East Dock, Beaumont, TX	Disposal
Shughart	Gulf	T-AKR 295	1996	LMSR	BRF, Beaumont, TX	Disposal
Yano	Gulf	T-AKR 297	1996	LMSR	BRF, Beaumont, TX	Disposal
Non-retention Barge Ship
Cape May	Gulf	AKR 5063	1973	C8-S-82a	BRF, Beaumont, TX	Disposal
Cape Mohican	Gulf	AKR 5065	1973	C8-S-82a	BRF, Beaumont, TX	Disposal
Non-retention - Other
Fall River	Gulf	T-EPF 4	2014	High Speed Catamaran	BRF, Beaumont, TX	Disposal

== See also ==
- Atlantic Reserve Fleet, Orange
- Ready Reserve Force
- Project Liberty Ship
- Naval Inactive Ship Maintenance Facility
