= USS Idaho =

Five ships of the United States Navy have been named USS Idaho in honor of the 43rd state.

- USS Idaho (1864) was a wooden steam sloop later converted to a full-rigged sailing ship
- USS Idaho (BB-24), a Mississippi-class battleship, was launched on 9 December 1905 and was sold to Greece on 30 July 1914
- USS Idaho (SP-545) was a motor boat acquired by the US Navy in June 1917 and returned to her owner 30 November 1918
- USS Idaho (BB-42) was a New Mexico-class battleship launched on 30 June 1917, saw action in World War II, and was sold for scrap 24 November 1947
- USS Idaho (SSN-799) is a Virginia-class submarine commissioned in April 2026

== See also ==
- SS Gem State, an auxiliary Keystone State-class crane ship launched in 1965 and in ready reserve since 1984.
