= Cape Race (disambiguation) =

Cape Race may refer to:

- Cape Race, a point of land located at the southeastern tip of the Avalon Peninsula on the island of Newfoundland, Canada
  - Cape Race LORAN-C transmitter, an antenna tower at Cape Race, Newfoundland, Canada
  - Cape Race Lighthouse
- The Cape Race, a five-piece rock band from Manchester, United Kingdom
- MV Cape Race (T-AKR-9960), a US Navy ship
