= Pacific Reserve Fleet, Alameda =

Reserve Fleet in Alameda, California

Pacific Reserve Fleet, Alameda Ready Reserve Fleet Alameda
- Alameda, California, United States
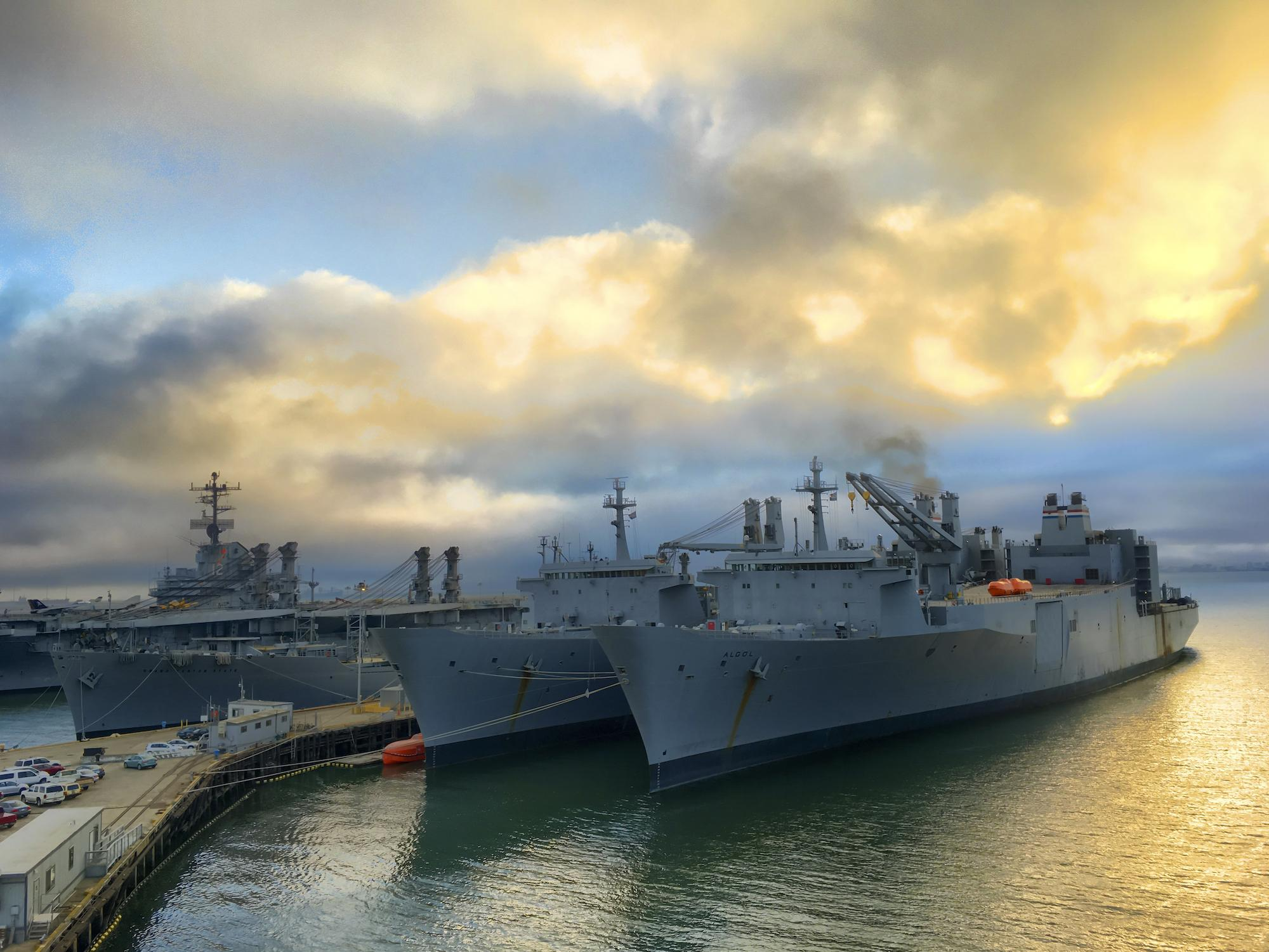
- Ready Reserve Force Alameda California, at former Atlantic Reserve Fleet, Alameda

Site information
- Type: Reserve Fleet
- Owner: United States
- Operator: United States Navy

Location
- Coordinates: 37°46′21.15″N 122°18′10.23″W

Site history
- Built: 1946
- In use: Atlantic Reserve Fleet, Alameda (1946-1976); Ready Reserve Fleet (1976-)

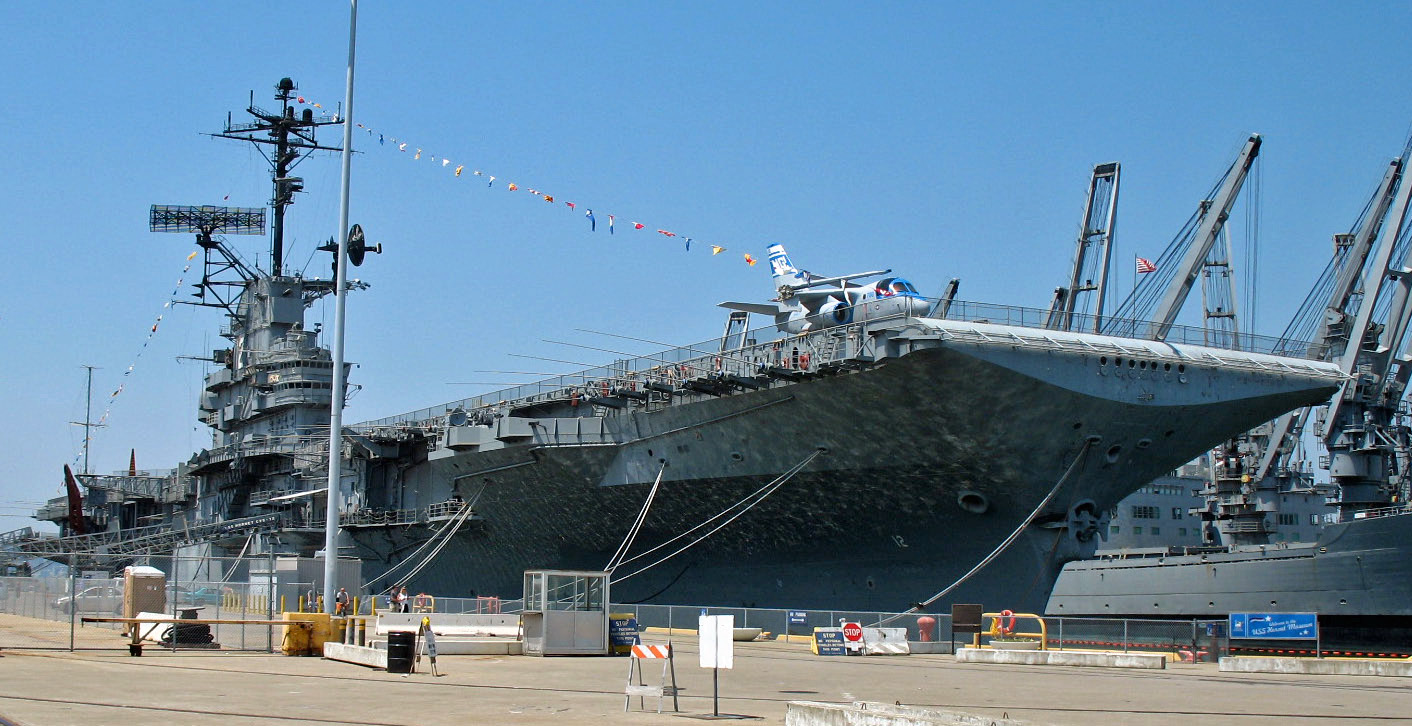
USS Hornet docked in former Atlantic Reserve Fleet, Alameda

Pacific Reserve Fleet, Alameda was a part of the United States Navy reserve fleets, also called a mothball fleet, that was used to store the many surplus ships after World War II. The Pacific Reserve Fleet, Alameda was part of the former Naval Air Station Alameda in Alameda, California, in the San Francisco Bay. Some ships in the fleet were reactivated for the Korean War and Vietnam War.

The site today is the USS Hornet Museum, home of the USS Hornet that opened in 1998 and, from 1976, home of the Ready Reserve Fleet, of the Ready Reserve Force, managed by United States Maritime Administration (MARAD).

== Stored ships ==
Currently stored ships:

- GTS Adm Wm M. Callaghan (T-AKR-1001)
- MV Cape Orlando (T-AKR-2044)
- SS Gem State (T-ACS-2)
- SS Keystone State (T-ACS-1)

Past ships:

- SS Algol (T-AKR-287)
- SS Capella (T-AKR-293)
- MV Cape Orlando (T-AKR-2044)
- SS Grand Canyon State (T-ACS-3)

== See also ==
- List of Ready Reserve Force ships
- U.S. Navy museums (and other aircraft-carrier museums)
- List of aircraft carriers of the United States Navy
- List of maritime museums in the United States
