= MV Cape Edmont =

Cape E-class roll-on/roll-off

Coordinates: 32.8505002°N 79.9397773°W

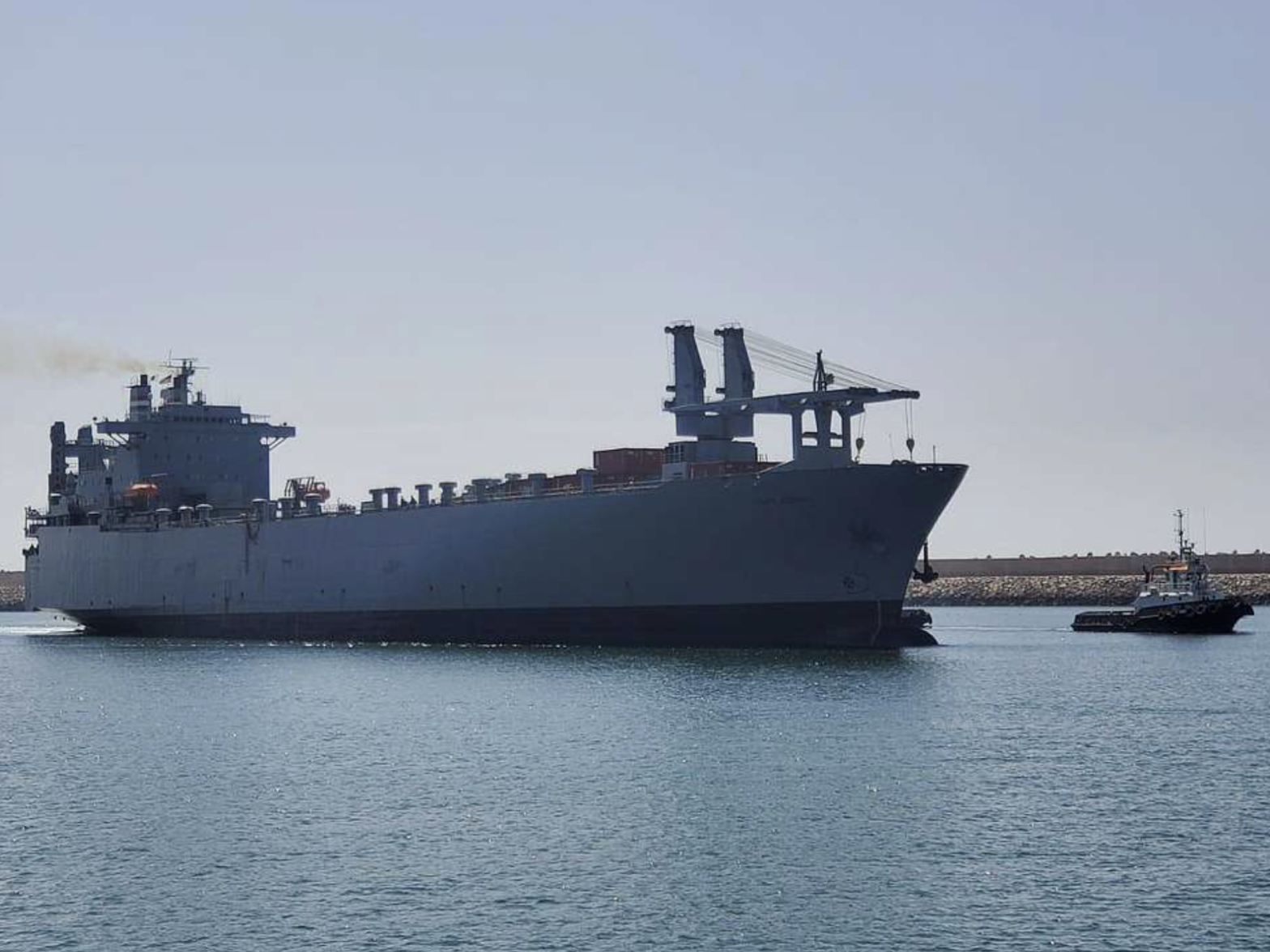
- MV Cape Edmont

History

United States
- Name: Cape Edmont
- Namesake: Cape Edmont
- Owner: Rederi AB TransAtlantic (1971–1986); Automar IV Corp. (1986–1987); Department of Transportation (1987–present)
- Operator: Military Sealift Command
- Builder: Eriksbergs Mekaniska Verkstad
- Laid down: 1971
- Launched: 1971
- Acquired: January 1971
- Renamed: Paralla (1971–1987)
- Identification: IMO number: 7027576; MMSI number: 366206000; Callsign: KGTE; Hull number: T-AKR-5069
- Status: Laid up in Charleston, in ROS-5 status

General characteristics
- Class & type: Cape E-class roll-on/roll-off
- Displacement: 12,000 t (11,810 long tons), light; 32,543 t (32,029 long tons), full
- Length: 682 ft 0 in (207.87 m)
- Beam: 94 ft (29 m)
- Draft: 31 ft 0 in (9.45 m)
- Installed power: 1 × Variable Pitch propeller
- Propulsion: 3 × Pielstick diesel engine
- Speed: 15.7 knots (29.1 km/h; 18.1 mph)
- Complement: 9 reserve; 27 operational
- Time to activate: Within 5 days

MV Cape Edmont (T-AKR-5069), (former MV Paralla), was a Cape E-class roll-on/roll-off built in 1971.

== Construction and commissioning ==
The ship was built in 1971 by Eriksbergs Mekaniska Verkstad, Eriksberg, Gothenburg. She was delivered to be used by Rederi AB TransAtlantic as MV Paralla in January of the same year.

On 7 July 1986, Automar IV Corporation purchased the ship and was renamed MV Cape Edmont. She was then sold to the Department of Transportation's Maritime Administration for their Ready Reserve Force on 20 April 1987 and re-designated T-AKR-5069. She would be operated by the Military Sealift Command if activated.

An internal fire broke out which resulted in the breaking down of Cape Edmont occurred during the 1991 Gulf War. She required towing back to port for repairs. During the 1998 Atlantic hurricane season, she was part of the four Ready Reserve Fleet provided disaster relief to Central America.

On 8 January 2004, the ship would be reactivated for the transport of rotating troops of June 2004 during the Iraq War. She unloaded M196A1s, M870A1s and UH-60s for the 108th Aviation Brigade in Colón, Panama during New Horizons 2005.

On 29 February 2020, Cape Edmont with 7,000 tons of military cargo arrived at the Port of Agadir, Morocco in preparation for African Lion 20.

She currently sits at the Atlantic Reserve Fleet, Charleston a National Defense Reserve Fleet in Charleston, South Carolina in ROS-5 status.

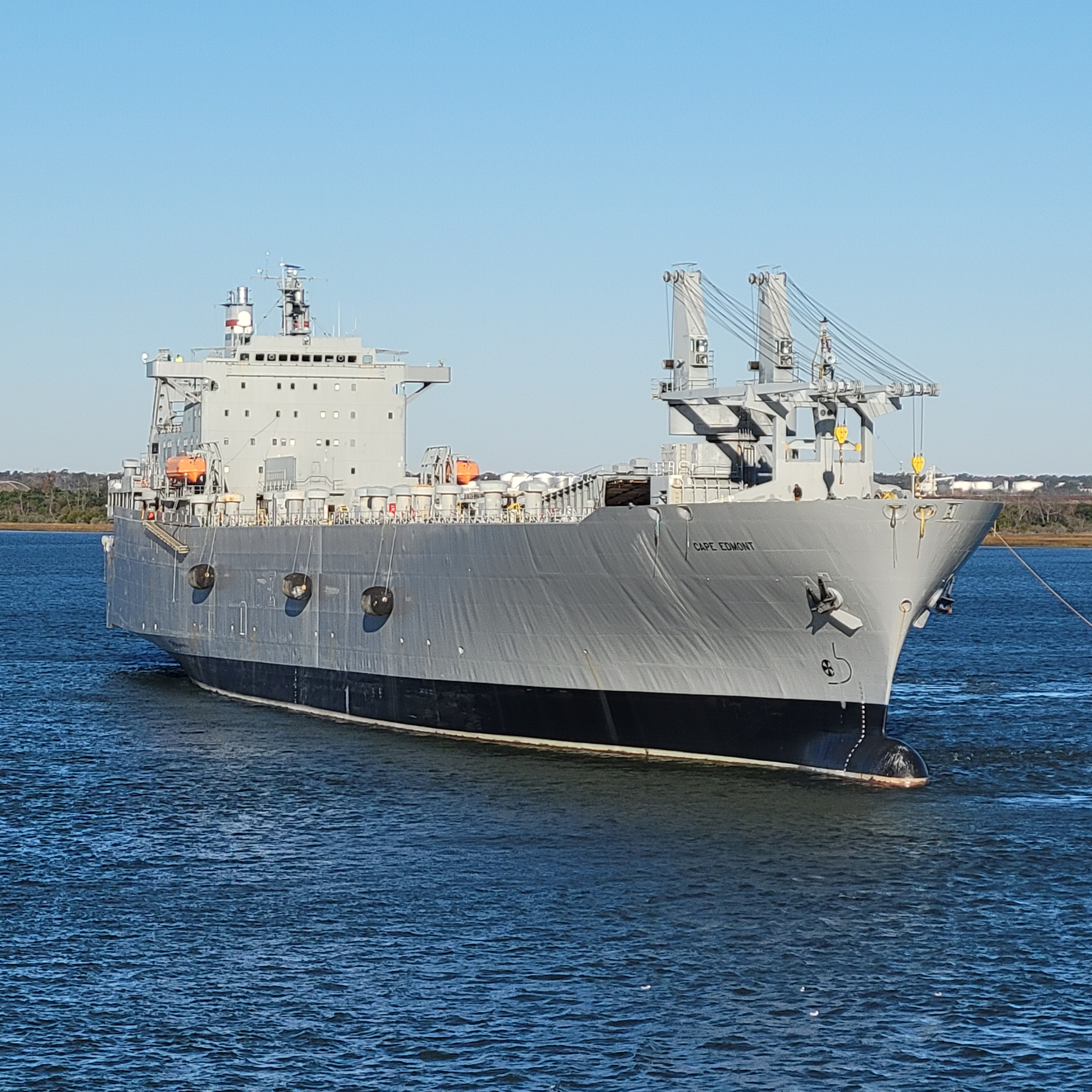
MV Cape Edmont in 2023
