= SS Pacific Tracker =

Crane ship in Ready Reserve for the United States Navy

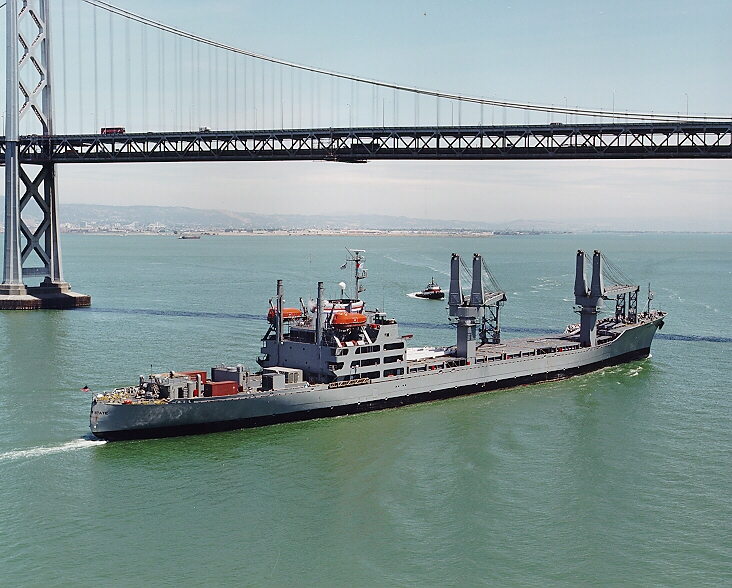
- SS Beaver State (T-ACS-10)

History

United States
- Name: SS Mormacdraco (1964 - 1983); SS American Draco (1983 - 1997); SS Beaver State (1997 - 2006); SS Pacific Tracker (2009 - present)
- Builder: Ingalls Shipbuilding, Pascagoula, Mississippi
- Laid down: 13 April 1964
- Launched: 14 January 1965
- Acquired: 2 April 1987
- Out of service: 28 July 2006
- Identification: IMO number: 6507921; MMSI number: 368949000; Callsign: WQVZ; Hull number: MA #144
- Notes: Launched as SS Mormacdraco

General characteristics
- Class & type: Keystone State-class crane ship
- Displacement: 27,900 tons
- Length: 665 ft 8 in (202.90 m)
- Beam: 75 ft 0 in (22.86 m)
- Draft: 31 ft 6 in (9.60 m)
- Propulsion: two boilers, two steam turbines, single propeller, 13,851 shaft horsepower (10,329 kW)
- Speed: 20.4 kn (23.5 mph; 37.8 km/h)
- Capacity: 45,750 square feet (4,250 m^{2}) of Cargo
- Complement: Full Operational Status: 89 civilian mariners Reduced Operational Status: 10 civilian mariners

SS Pacific Tracker is a United States Maritime Administration (MARAD) missile range instrumentation ship that monitors tests conducted by the Missile Defense Agency. It was formerly a crane ship named SS Beaver State (T-ACS-10) was named for the state of Oregon, which is also known as the Beaver State. As of 30 September, 2023, Pacific Tracker was listed in the National Defense Reserve Fleet, Pacific division assigned to Portland, OR.

== History ==
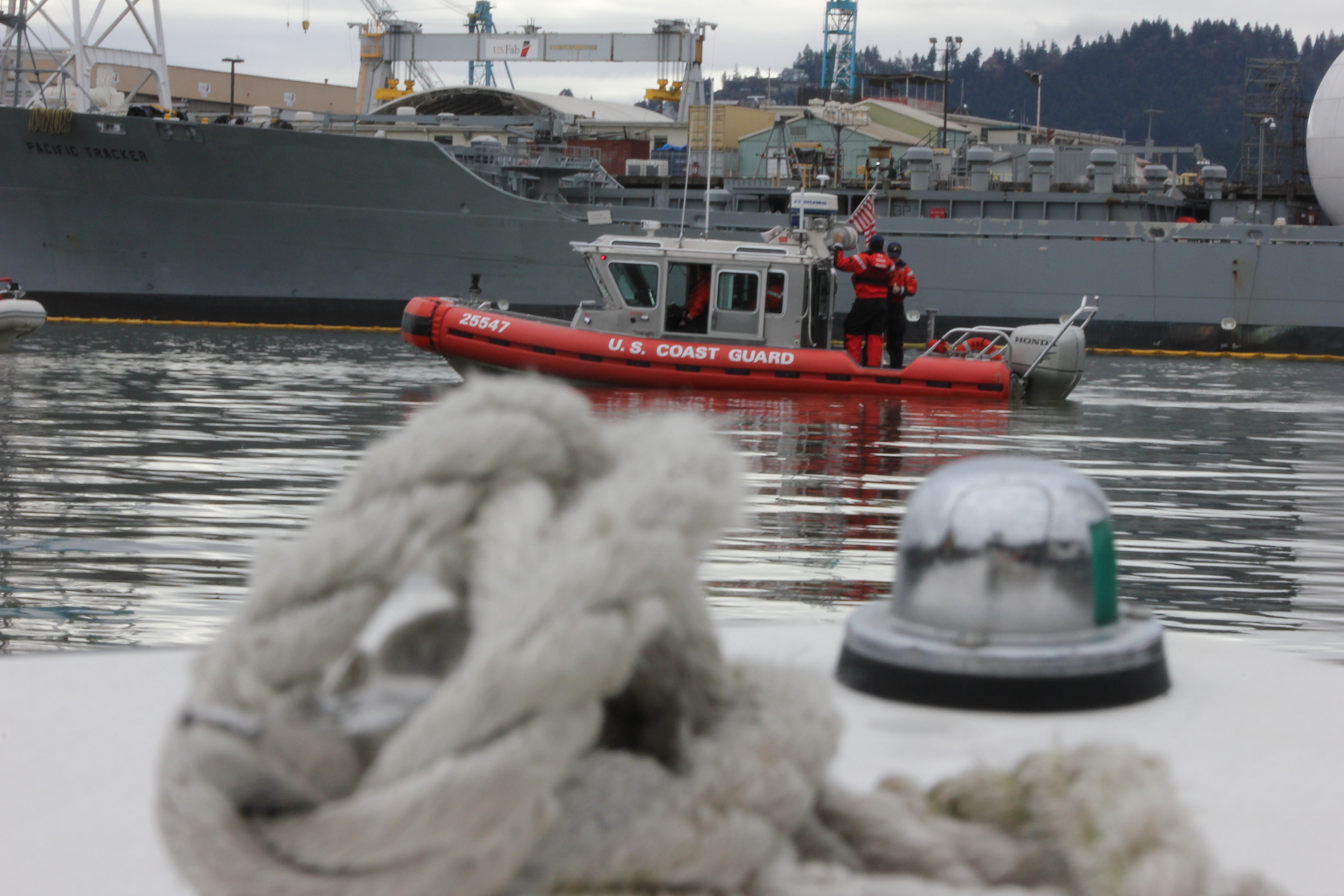
Pacific Tracker in background 2012

Beaver State was laid down on 13 April 1964, as the break-bulk freighter, SS Mormacdraco, ON 299008, IMO 6507921, a Maritime Administration type (C4-S-60a) hull, under MARAD contract (MA 144). Built by Ingalls Shipbuilding Inc., Pascagoula, MS, hull no. 487, she was launched on 14 January 1965 and delivered to MARAD 28 May 1965, for service with Moore-McCormack Lines. In 1976 the ship was lengthened and converted to a partial container ship by Todd Ship Yard, Galveston, TX. She was sold to United States Lines in 1983 and renamed SS American Draco, 13 September. US Lines ceased operations in 1986 and the ship was turned over to the MARAD on 2 April 1987 and placed in the National Defense Reserve Fleet (NDRF). The ship was selected for conversion to a MARAD type (C6-S-MA60b) crane ship, but conversion was canceled, 12 January 1990. Conversion resumed in 1992, but was not completed by National Steel and Shipbuilding Co., San Diego, CA until 4 May 1997, when she was placed in service as SS Beaver State (T-ACS-10) and assigned to the Ready Reserve Force (RRF), under operation control of the Military Sealift Command (MSC). Beaver State was berthed in Bremerton, WA and assigned to Maritime Prepositioning Ship Squadron Three and was maintained in a five-day readiness status. She was removed from MSC control and withdrawn from the RRF by reassignment to the NDRF on 28 July 2006.

She was converted for the Missile Defense Agency at Cascade General Shipyard (Portland, OR) to an X-Band Transportable Radar Ship, designated (XTR-1) and renamed SS Pacific Tracker, 1 April 2009.
