= MV Cape Wrath =

Cape W-class roll-on/roll-off

Coordinates: 39.2621591°N 76.6014007°W

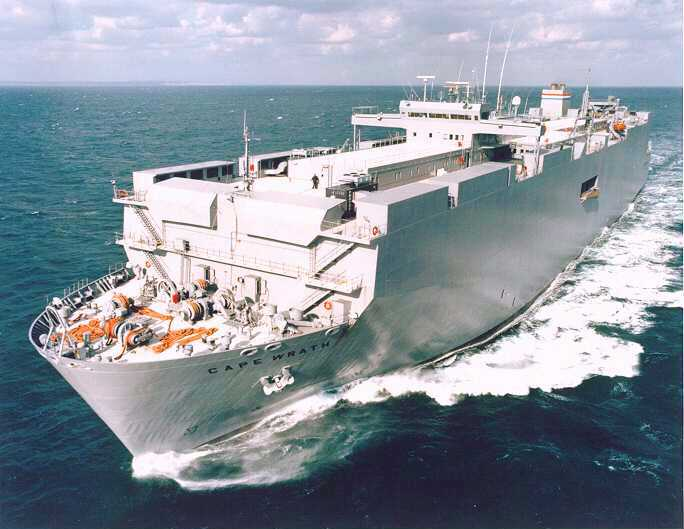
- Cape Wrath under way

History

United States
- Name: Cape Wrath
- Namesake: Cape Wrath
- Owner: Grace Marine Co. S.A.
- Builder: Stocznia im Komuny Partyskiej, Gdynia, Poland (now Stocznia Gdynia)
- Yard number: 48701
- Launched: 6 December 1980
- Completed: 26 March 1982
- Acquired: 7 April 1993
- Renamed: from Hual Trader
- Identification: IMO number: 7826166; MMSI number: 303940000; Callsign: WRGJ; Pennant number: T-AKR-9962
- Status: In active service

General characteristics
- Class & type: Cape W-class roll-on/roll-off
- Tonnage: 51,960 GT
- Displacement: 53,652 long tons
- Length: 697 feet
- Beam: 105 feet 11 inches
- Draft: 38 feet
- Propulsion: Diesel, single propeller
- Speed: 14.9 knots
- Range: Not Disclosed
- Complement: 27 civilian mariners
- Armament: none
- Armor: none
- Aircraft carried: none

MV Cape Wrath (T-AKR-9962) was originally built as a commercial ship in 1982 and sold to the Grace Marine Company with the name Hual Trader. She has a sister ship named MV Cape Washington.

== Construction and career ==
She served as a merchant ship until she was purchased by the US Department of Transportation, Maritime Administration on 7 April 1993. From there she was later transferred to the Maritime Administration's Ready Reserve Fleet and assigned to Maryland. Since then she has been activated to serve in bringing vehicles and supplies to Europe, from where they are air-lifted to troops engaged in Iraq and Afghanistan.

== Gallery ==
MV Cape Wrath

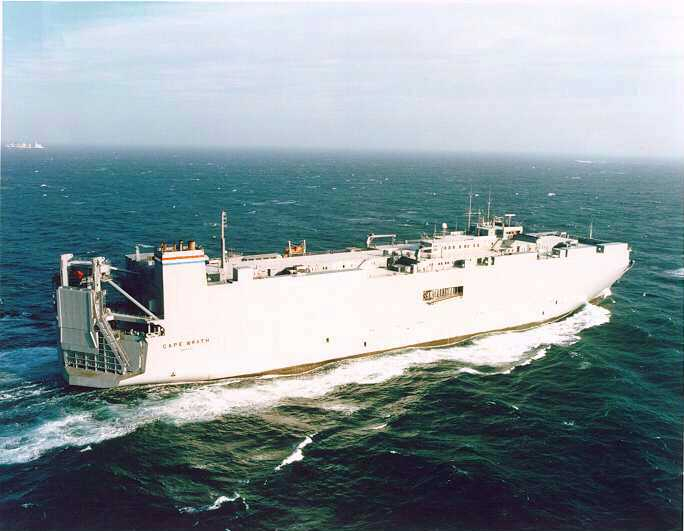
Cape Wrath under way

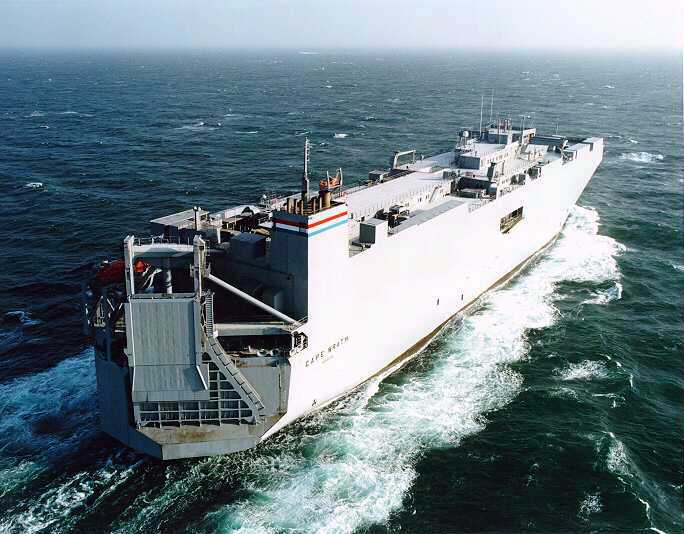
Cape Wrath under way
