= Keystone State-class crane ship =

Class of ship in the United States Navy

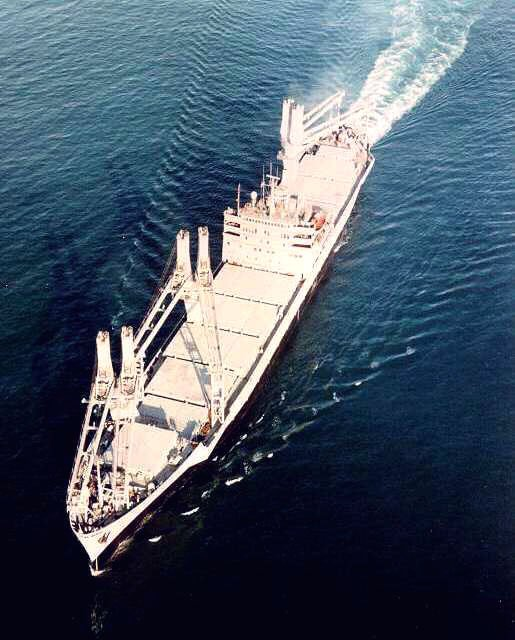
- SS Keystone State (T-ACS-1)

Class overview
- Name: Keystone State
- Builders: Various
- Operators: United States Navy
- Built: 1984-1997
- Completed: 10
- Active: 6
- Laid up: 4

General characteristics
- Type: Crane Ship
- Displacement: 26670 tons
- Length: 610 ft 0 in (95.82 m)
- Beam: 78 ft 0 in (9.43 m)
- Draft: 32 ft
- Propulsion: Steam Turbine, 12,758 SHP
- Speed: 17 knots
- Complement: 78 mariners

The Keystone State-class crane ships are seven auxiliary crane ships of the U.S. Maritime Administration Ready Reserve Force. The ships can be quickly activated to support military sea transportation needs. These self-sustaining ships are useful in ports that have limited, damaged or undeveloped port facilities. When activated, they come under operational control of Military Sealift Command.

== Description ==
The crane ships are converted container ships with three twin boom pedestal cranes which can lift containers or other cargo from themselves or adjacent vessels and deposit the cargo on a pier or lighterage.

== History ==
The US Navy converted ten cargo ships to crane ships, three Gopher State class and seven Keystone State class, the first of which was completed in 1984 and the last of which was completed in 1997. Five of the ships were deployed to the Persian Gulf in 1990–91. USNS Gopher State acted as a temporary Army prepositioning ship in 1994. Four of the ten ships have been deactivated and transferred to the reserve fleet.

== General characteristics ==
- Builder: Defoe SB Co, Bay City; Dillingham SR, Portland; Norshipco, Norfolk; Tampa SY; Keith Ship Repair, New Orleans
- Propulsion: 2 boilers; 2 GE turbines; 19,250 hp; 1 shaft.
- Length: 668.6 feet.
- Beam: 76.1 feet
- Displacement: 31,500 tons(32,005.52 metric tons) full load
- Speed: 20 knots
- Crew: 89 civilians
- Load: 300+ standard containers

== List of ships ==
- SS Keystone State (T-ACS-1)
- SS Gem State (T-ACS-2)
- SS Grand Canyon State (T-ACS-3)
- SS Diamond State (T-ACS-7)
- SS Equality State (T-ACS-8)
- SS Green Mountain State (T-ACS-9)
- SS Beaver State (T-ACS-10)
