= SS Green Mountain State =

Crane ship in ready reserve for the United States Navy

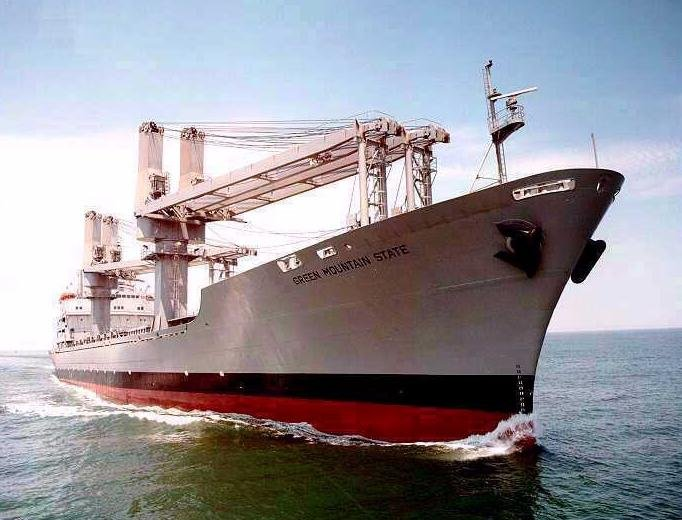
- SS Green Mountain State (T-ACS-9)

History

United States
- Name: Green Mountain State
- Builder: Ingalls Shipbuilding Inc., Pascagoula, Mississippi
- Laid down: 2 December 1963
- Launched: 20 August 1964
- Acquired: 15 March 1992
- Out of service: 28 July 2006
- Identification: IMO number: 6421347; MMSI number: 366035000; Callsign: WMSM
- Status: National Defense Reserve Fleet - disposal
- Notes: Launched as SS Mormacaltair

General characteristics
- Class & type: Keystone State-class crane ship
- Displacement: 31,500 tons
- Length: 668 ft 6 in (203.76 m)
- Beam: 76 ft 1 in (23.19 m)
- Draft: 33 ft 5 in (10.19 m)
- Propulsion: two General Electric turbines two boilers single propeller, 19,250shp
- Speed: 17 kn (20 mph; 31 km/h)
- Capacity: 300+ Cargo Containers
- Complement: Full Operational Status: 89 civilian mariners Reduced Operational Status: 10 civilian mariners
- Armament: None
- Aviation facilities: None

SS Green Mountain State (T-ACS-9) is a crane ship in ready reserve for the United States Navy. The ship was named for the state of Vermont, which is also known as the Green Mountain State.

== History ==
Green Mountain State was laid down on 2 December 1963 as the break-bulk freighter SS Mormacaltair, ON 298129, IMO 6421347, a Maritime Administration type (C4-S-60a) hull, under MARAD contract (MA 143). Built by Ingalls Shipbuilding at Pascagoula, Mississippi (hull no. 486), she was launched on 20 August 1964 and delivered to MARAD 26 March 1965, for service with Moore-McCormack Lines, Inc. In 1975 the ship was lengthened and converted to a partial container ship by Todd Ship Yard, Galveston, Texas. She was sold to United States Lines in 1983 and renamed SS American Altair. US Lines ceased operations in 1986 and the ship was turned over to MARAD in 1987 and placed in the National Defense Reserve Fleet (NDRF). The ship was converted to a MARAD hull type (C6-S-MA60d) Crane Ship at National Steel and Shipbuilding Co., San Diego, California, and placed in service as SS Green Mountain State (T-ACS-9) on 15 March 1992, assigned to the Ready Reserve Force (RRF), under operation control of Military Sealift Command (MSC).

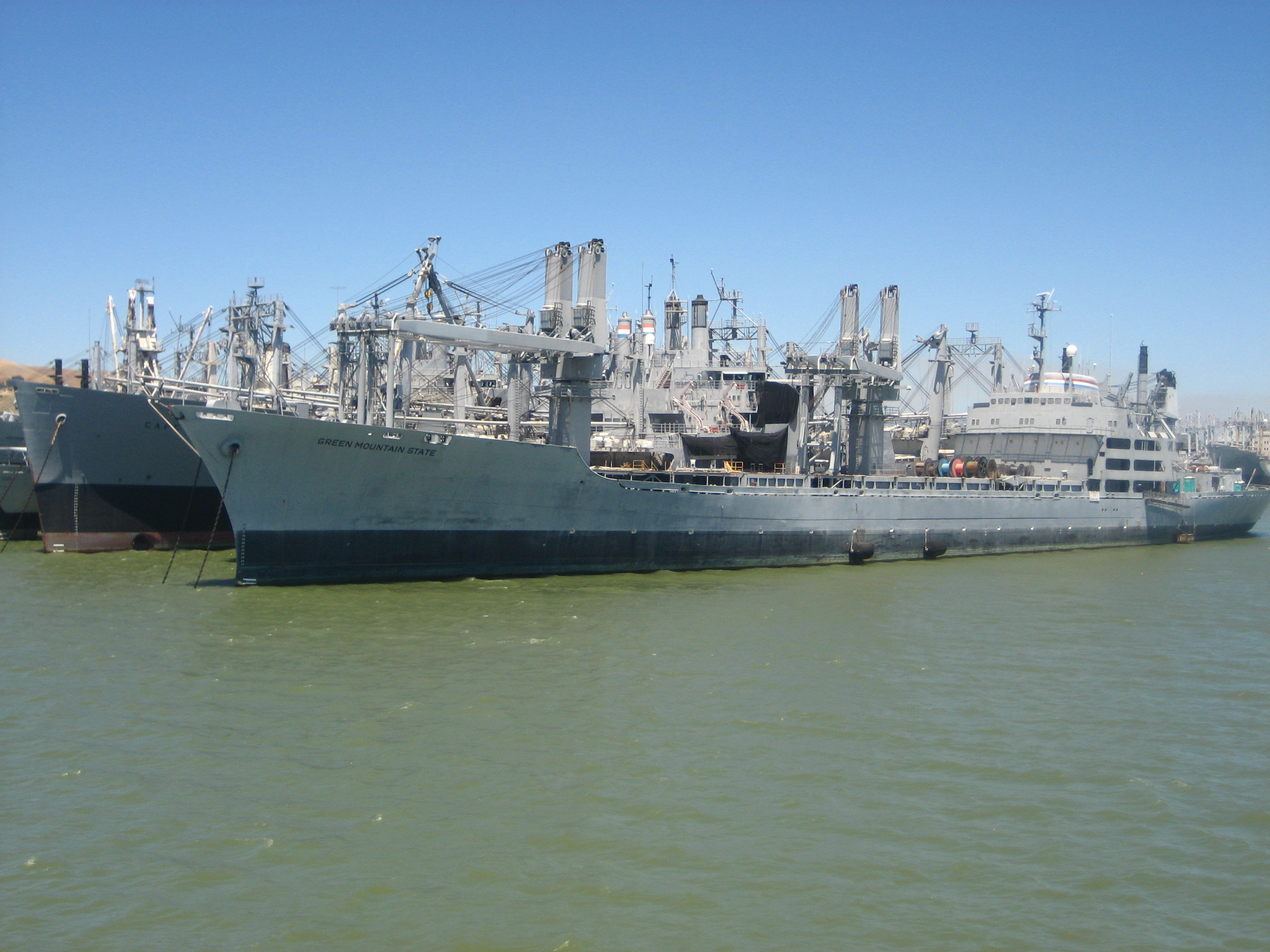
Mothballed in Suisun Bay, 2011

Green Mountain State was berthed at Bremerton, Washington, where she was maintained in a five-day readiness status, assigned to Maritime Prepositioning Ship Squadron Three. She was removed from MSC control and withdrawn from the RRF by reassignment to the National Defense Reserve Fleet (Beaumont, Texas) on 28 July 2006. She has since been reassigned to the Suisun Bay Reserve Fleet. she as of now is on the 2025 national reserve fleet listed for disposal.
