= SS Keystone State (T-ACS-1) =

Crane ship in Ready Reserve for the United States Navy

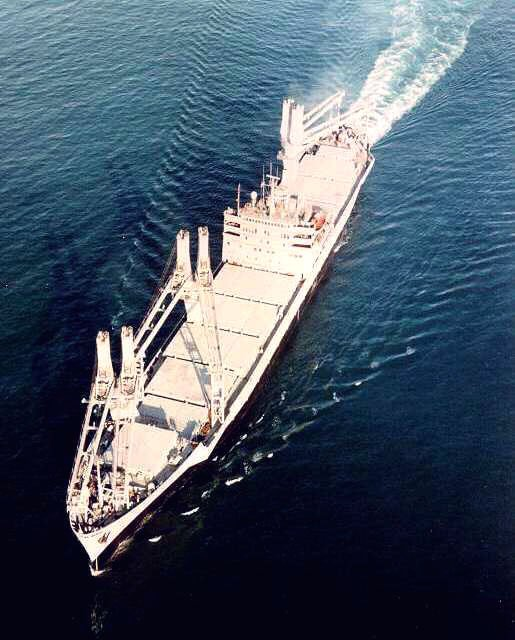
- SS Keystone State (T-ACS-1)

History

United States
- Name: SS Keystone State (T-ACS-1)
- Builder: National Steel and Shipbuilding Company, San Diego, CA
- Laid down: 23 January 1965
- Launched: 10 February 1965
- Acquired: July 1984
- In service: Delivered to the American President Lines, 25 April 1966
- Home port: Alameda, CA
- Identification: IMO number: 6605022; MMSI number: 366565000; Callsign: WCJI
- Status: In ready reserve since 1984. Five days needed to activate.
- Notes: Launched as the SS President Harrison

General characteristics
- Class & type: Keystone State-class crane ship
- Displacement: 31,500 tons
- Length: 668 ft 5 in (203.73 m)
- Beam: 76 ft 1 in (23.19 m)
- Draft: 33 ft 6 in (10.21 m)
- Propulsion: 2 Combustion Engineering boilers, 2 GE geared steam turbines; 10,747shp, one propeller
- Speed: 17 kn (20 mph; 31 km/h)
- Capacity: 300+ Cargo Containers
- Complement: Full Operational Status: 37 civilian mariners Reduced Operational Status: 10 civilian mariners
- Armament: None
- Aviation facilities: None

SS Keystone State (T-ACS-1) is a crane ship in ready reserve for the United States Navy. The ship was named for the state of Pennsylvania, which is also known as the Keystone State.

== History ==
Keystone State was laid down on 23 January 1965, as the combination breakbulk-container ship SS President Harrison, ON 502569, IMO 6605022, a Maritime Administration type (C4-S-1qa) hull, under MARAD contract (MA 166). Built by National Steel and Shipbuilding Co., San Diego, CA, hull no. 339, she was launched 10 February 1965, and delivered to MARAD on 25 April 1966, for service with American President Lines. She was converted to a MARAD type (C6-S-1qc) container ship, 16 February 1973, and continued to be operated by APL until delivered to the Maritime Administration, 19 July 1982, for lay up in the National Defense Reserve Fleet (NDRF), Suisun Bay, Benicia, CA, and was later transferred to NDRF James River, Lee Hall, VA., 11 September 1982. In 1983-1984 the ship was converted to a type (C6-S-MA1qd) Crane Ship at Bay Shipbuilding, Sturgeon Bay, Wisconsin. She was placed in service as SS Keystone State (ACS-1) 7 May 1984, and assigned to the Military Sealift Command (MSC) Ready Reserve Force (RRF).

The ship is one of 10 Crane Ships in the Military Sealift Command Surge Force and is berthed at Alameda, CA.; assigned to Maritime Prepositioning Ship Squadron Three, she is maintained in a five-day readiness status (ROS 5) at the Ready Reserve Fleet Alameda.
