= MV Cape Victory =

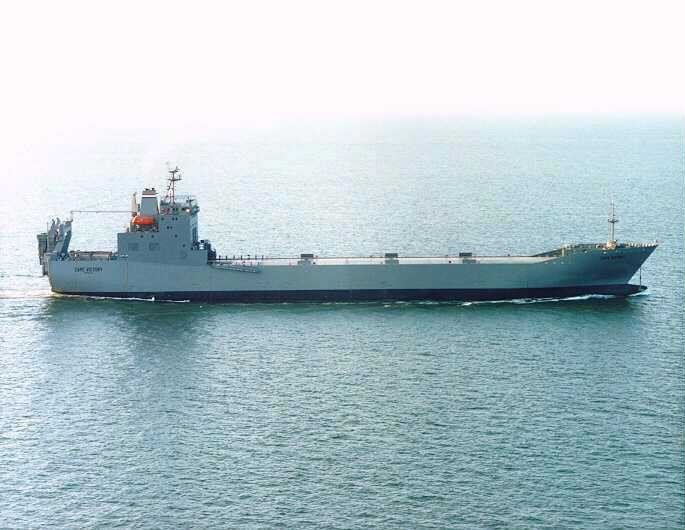
- MV Cape Victory (T-AKR-9701)

History

United States
- Name: MV Cape Victory (T-AKR-9701)
- Builder: Fincantieri, Genoa, Italy
- Launched: September 24 1984
- Acquired: 1993
- In service: April 2 1993
- Home port: Beaumont, TX
- Identification: IMO number: 8211306; MMSI number: 303923000; Callsign: KAEY
- Status: In ready reserve since 1994. Four days needed to activate.
- Notes: MV Marzario Britainna

General characteristics
- Class & type: Cape V-class Roll-on/Roll-off ship
- Displacement: 30,644 tons
- Length: 631 ft 0 in (192.33 m)
- Beam: 87 ft 0 in (26.52 m)
- Draft: 28 ft 4 in (8.64 m)
- Propulsion: one slow speed diesel engine, 9,184 hp, one propeller
- Speed: 14 kn (16 mph; 26 km/h)
- Capacity: 26,690 sq. ft. vehicle space or 1,306 standard containers
- Complement: Full Operational Status: 25 civilian mariners
- Armament: 12 Man Force Protection Team
- Aviation facilities: In an emergency Helicopters can land on the vessels Spar Deck

MV Cape Victory (T-AKR-9701) was built in 1984 as MV Marzario Britainna by Cant Nav. Italiani. After launching, it was delivered to CMB T. Italy for commercial operation. She was acquired on April 2, 1993, by the United States Department of Transportation, Maritime Administration and renamed MV Cape Victory on April 2 1994 and assigned to the Maritime Administration's Ready Reserve Force, August 19th 1994. When activated Cape Victory is one of the Maritime Administration's 31 Roll-on/Roll-off Reserve Force Ships assigned to the US Navy's Military Sealift Command (MSC) Sealift Program Office. Cape Victory is nested at the National Defense Reserve Fleet in Beaumont, Texas, in ROS-5 status, with a 10-man maintenance crew on board.

== History ==
Upon the conclusion of its reflagging, Cape Victory entered the Ready Reserve Force in Reduced Operating Status – 4 (ROS-4) on 2 September 1994. The vessel is required to be ready for tender to COMSC within 96 hours of an activation notice. The ten (10) person ROS crew performs continuous maintenance in order to maintain the vessel in class with the American Bureau of Shipping and fully certificated by the USCG.

Within seven days of entering the RRF, on 9 September 1994, the MV Cape Victory loaded cargo at Wilmington, NC and departed for Port-au-Prince, Haiti via Guantanamo, Cuba. MV Cape Victory supported Operation Uphold Democracy, a peace keeping mission, for 94 days before returning to Beaumont, TX. Following her return from Uphold Democracy she returned to her layberth.

MV Cape Victory was activated on 4 December 1998, for a test of her readiness mission. The vessel was fully operational when her sail orders were changed and she supported the humanitarian relief effort to Central America in response to the damage caused by Hurricane Mitch. Cape Victory transported construction equipment and relief supplies for 23 days, returning to her layberth.

The Cape Victory was activated on 17 January 2003 for Operation Iraqi Freedom and loaded cargo from the 4th Infantry Division at the Port of Beaumont. The ship spent a total of 110 days in Full Operating Service (FOS) discharging cargo in Kuwait and returning to Beaumont on 9 May 2003. Cape Victory was active moving military equipment to Kuwait and back until the latter part of 2005. In 2005 Cape Victory provided relief to victims of Hurricane Rita in Beaumont, Texas. Cape Victory is currently located in the Beaumont Reserve Fleet in Reduced Operating Status with a crew of 10. Patriot Contract Services is the current Ship Manager.

Cape Victory moved to the MARAD Reserve Fleet in Beaumont, Texas in August 2009 along with her sister ship the Cape Vincent saving the US Government approximately $1,000,000.00 per year.

== Cargo Capability ==
From June through November 1998, Cape Victory and her sister vessel, Cape Vincent, were modified by the addition of a new spar deck. This increased the overall militarily useful square-ft capacity of each vessel.

The two Cape V-class ships function the same in their ability to load wheeled and tracked vehicles via the stern ramp. MV Cape Victory's most notable feature is its total deck capacity consisting of 133,621 sq. ft of which 103,181 is militarily useful. MV Cape Victory has 103,181 sq. ft of heavy deck strength (over 525psf with 13 f. clearances) and 30,440 sq.ft of light deck. In addition Cape Victory has 100, 450 volt reefer outlets.
