= MV Cape Trinity =

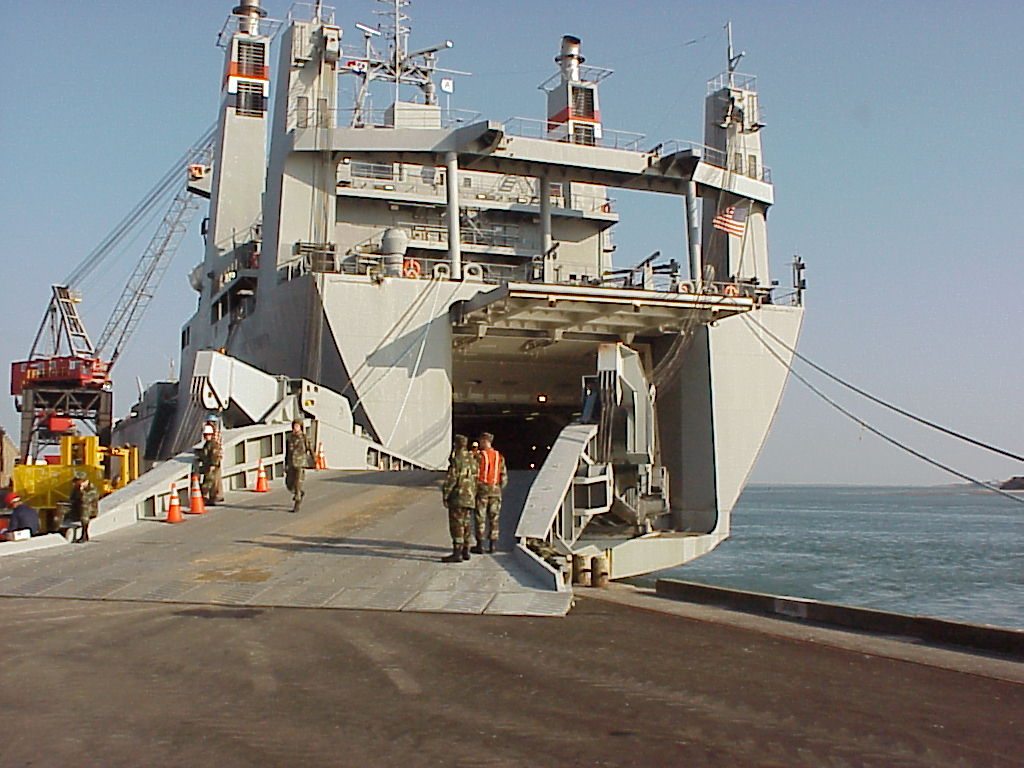
- Cape Trinity preparing to load vehicles through her stern ramp

History
- Name: MV Cape Trinity (T-AKR-9711)
- Owner: United States Department of Transportation
- Operator: United States Maritime Administration
- Builder: Howaldtswerke-Deutsche Werft, Kiel, Germany
- Launched: 19 July 1977
- Acquired: 15 November 1994
- In service: 21 November 1994
- Home port: Houston, Texas
- Identification: IMO number: 7602259; MMSI number: 366838000; Callsign: KAFD
- Status: RRF; ROS-5 status
- Notes: When activated, Cape Trinity comes under the operational control of the Military Sealift Command.

General characteristics
- Class & type: Cape T-class Roll-on/roll-off (Vehicle Carrier) ship
- Displacement: 24,561 long tons (24,955 t)
- Length: 634 ft 3 in (193.3 m) (Note: Sources conflict on overall length. Polmar (2005, p. 318) and Silverstone (2011, p. 244) both list an overall length of 627 ft 10 in (191.4 m). Conversely, NavSource and MARAD list a length of 634 ft 3 in (193.3 m).)
- Beam: 88 ft 7 in (27.0 m)
- Height: 157 ft 6 in (48.0 m)
- Draft: 28 ft 4 in (8.6 m)
- Installed power: 18,980 bhp (14.15 MW)
- Propulsion: 2 × MAN 9L 52/55A heavy oil Diesel Engines with one Propeller
- Speed: 20.5 knots (38.0 km/h; 23.6 mph)
- Range: 22,600 nautical miles (41,900 km) @ 16.5 knots (30.6 km/h; 19.0 mph)
- Crew: 10 civilians in reserve status; 25 civilians when activated (Note: Sources conflict on crew size. Polmar (2005, p. 318) and Silverstone (2011, p. 244) both list a crew of 49 civilians. Conversely, NavSource lists a crew of 27 civilians. The RRF Fleet Pamphlet lists a crew of 25 with a supercargo of 23 for a total crew of 48.)

MV Cape Trinity (T-AKR-9711) is a Roll-on/Roll-off (RO/RO) ship with the Ready Reserve Force (RRF) of the United States Department of Transportation's Maritime Administration (MARAD). As of 31 December 2014, the homeport of this motor vessel (MV) is the Port of Houston in Houston, Texas, and she is on ROS-5 status; she is able to be fully operational within 5 days of being activated. When activated, she becomes part of the United States Navy's Military Sealift Command (MSC).

== Design and construction ==
The vessel now known as Cape Trinity was laid down by Howaldtswerke-Deutsche Werft in Kiel, Germany, in 1977. She is a conventional RO/RO (Vehicle Carrier) ship with the superstructure aft, followed by twin funnels, and a stern ramp. She is 634 ft 3 in (193.3 m) in overall length with a lightweight displacement of 9,714 long tons (9,870 t) and a fully loaded displacement of 24,561 long tons (24,955 t). For carrying US Army and Marine Corps combat vehicles, she has 87,032 sq ft (8,085.5 m^{2}) of cargo capacity. She can carry 340 containers plus vehicles and her hull is ice strengthened.

== Service history ==
=== Commercial service ===
She began commercial service on 7 December 1977 with DDG Hansa Line as MV Rheinfels. She was sold to Anker Shipping GmbH, an affiliate of DDG Hansa, 13 October 1980. Following the bankruptcy of DDG Hansa, ownership passed to a Hamburg bank in December 1980. She was then sold to Christian F. Ahrenkiel of Hamburg and renamed MV Norefjord. Ownership passed in July 1981 to Heyo Janssen, Leer, Germany, she was renamed MV Radbod and was reflagged Panamanian.

She was auctioned off in September 1987 to a group of German banks, and resold to Argentinean interests. Again, she was resold in November 1987 to Vericaribe CA and renamed MV Santos retaining the Panama flag. In May 1990, she was chartered to Kent Line with the name MV Canadian Forest. She was resold to Conro Shipping Ltd. of Panama in September 1991 and renamed MV Santos. Ownership passed in 1993 to South American Shipping Co., tonnage date rearranged and modified and vessel was retransferred to Conro Shipping Ltd.

=== US Government service ===
Cape Trinity was acquired by the US Government on 15 November 1994 and became part of the Ready Reserve Fleet. In January thru March 1999, Cape Trinity participated in Operation Battle Griffin, the triennial exercise of reinforcing Norway, carrying US Marines between Morehead City, North Carolina, Cheatham Annex Naval Base, Virginia, and Hommelvik, Norway. On 23 January 2003, Cape Trinity was activated and placed "In Service" from the Ready Reserve Force to haul military cargo to the Middle East in support of Operation Iraqi Freedom. She proceeded to Corpus Christi, Texas, to load military vehicles and equipment. On 15 May 2003, she was placed "Out of Service" and returned to her Ready Reserve Force lay berth in Houston on a four-day recall status.

== Footnotes ==
Notes

Citations
