= MV Cape Race =

Vehicle carrier in service with US Navy

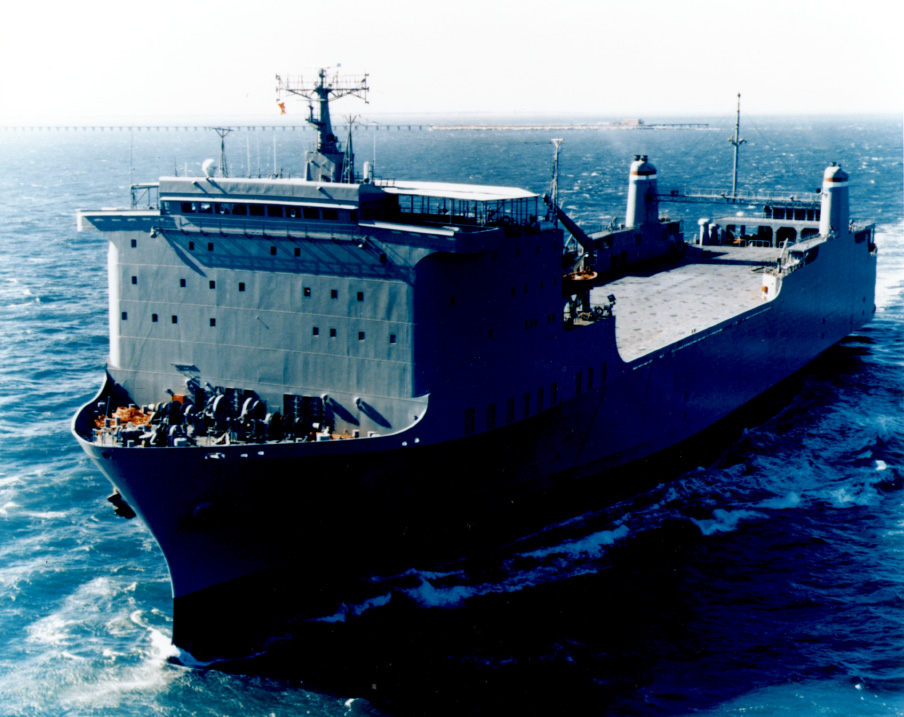
- Cape Race underway

History

United States
- Name: MV Seaspeed America
- Owner: United States Maritime Administration
- Builder: Kawasaki Heavy Industries, Japan
- Laid down: 1977
- Acquired: 28 April 1993, by the US Department of Transportation, Maritime Administration
- In service: April 1993
- Renamed: MV Cape Race, February 1st, 1994
- Identification: IMO number: 7616377; MMSI number: 366842000; Callsign: KAFJ
- Status: maintained in a layberth at Portsmouth, VA. in FOS-5

General characteristics
- Displacement: 12,872 empty, 35,357 full
- Length: 648 ft 6 in (197.66 m)
- Beam: 105 ft 6 in (32.16 m)
- Draft: 33 ft (10 m)
- Propulsion: Two medium speed MAN V Diesel engines; Two shaft generators and two auxiliary generators; Two propellers, 17,350 hp
- Speed: 16.6 knots
- Capacity: 132,209 sq. ft.

The MV Cape Race was originally built as the MV Seaspeed America for the Transocean RO-RO Corp. She was sold to various other corporations until she was purchased by the United States Navy in April 1993. She underwent conversion to fit a more active role in and serve a military need better and was placed back in service April 1993. She has served on multiple occasions but is currently in the US Ready Reserve Fleet.
