= SS Cape Isabel =

American cargo ship

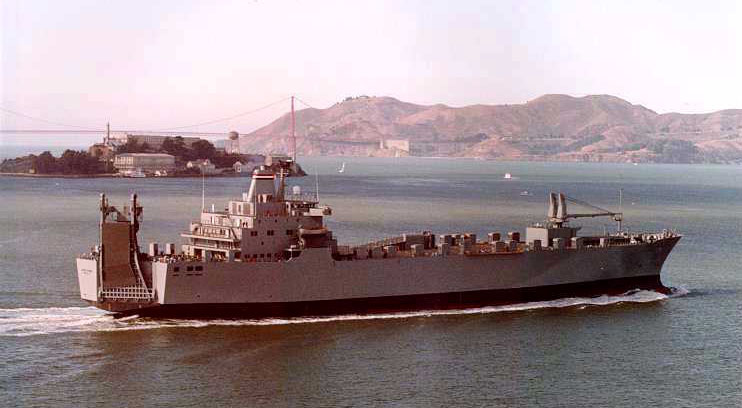
- Cape Isabel underway

History

United States
- Name: SS Nevada
- Owner: United States Maritime Administration
- Builder: Bath Iron Works, Bath, ME
- Laid down: July 28, 1975
- Launched: May 15, 1976
- Acquired: June 9, 1986
- Renamed: SS Cape Isabel
- Identification: IMO number: 7390129; MMSI number: 368849000; Callsign: KLHR
- Status: Currently undergoing recommissioning in drydock at Vigor Shipyards, Portland Oregon for the United States Navy.

General characteristics
- Class & type: Roll-on/Roll-off ship
- Displacement: 15,000 tons empty, 33,900 tons full
- Length: 655 feet
- Beam: 102 feet
- Draft: 32 feet
- Propulsion: Two steam turbines (one high pressure, one low pressure), one propeller
- Speed: 18.7 knots
- Complement: Full operational status 31, reserve status 9
- Armament: None
- Armor: None

The SS Cape Isabel (AKR-5062) was originally launched in 1976 as the SS Nevada, a Type C7 commercial ship. The States SS company took the first contract in 1976 and it operated until it was transferred to Lykes Brothers steamship company and renamed the SS Charles Lykes. Later the ship was reacquired from its commercial roles and brought back under military control via the Maritime Administration and renamed the Cape Isabel. Since then it has been kept in ready reserve status and used occasionally for heavy lifting operations to European theaters to have equipment air-lifted to active engagements. It has heavily participated in Operation Enduring Freedom ferrying goods across the Atlantic to staging points in Europe. As of August 2021, the ship is undergoing recommissioning at Vigor Shipyards in Portland, Oregon. As of May 2024, berthed in Long Beach, California adjacent to SS Cape Inscription.
