= MV Cape Taylor =

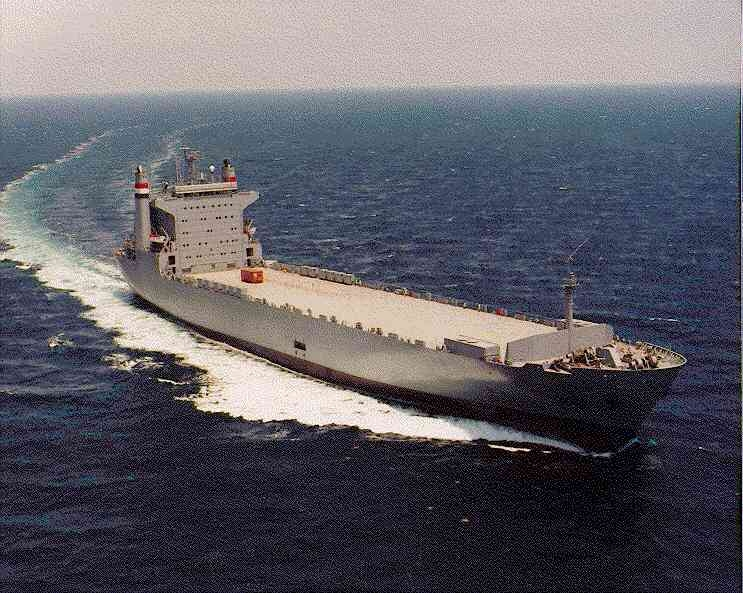
- Cape Taylor at sea

History
- Name: MV Cape Taylor (T-AKR-113)
- Owner: United States Department of Transportation
- Operator: United States Maritime Administration
- Builder: Sasebo Heavy Industries, Sasebo, Japan
- Launched: 8 July 1977
- Acquired: 15 March 1993
- In service: 27 July 1994
- Home port: Houston, Texas
- Identification: IMO number: 7603497; MMSI number: 366778000; Callsign: WZSB
- Status: RRF; ROS-5 status
- Notes: When activated, Cape Taylor comes under the operational control of the Military Sealift Command.

General characteristics
- Class & type: Cape T-class Roll-on/roll-off (Vehicle Carrier) ship
- Displacement: 26,456 long tons (26,881 t)
- Length: 634 ft 3 in (193.3 m) (Note: Sources conflict on overall length. Polmar (2005, p. 318) and Silverstone (2011, p. 244) both list an overall length of 627 ft 10 in (191.4 m). Conversely, NavSource and MARAD list a length of 634 ft 3 in (193.3 m).)
- Beam: 88 ft 7 in (27.0 m)
- Height: 163 ft 5 in (49.8 m)
- Draft: 28 ft 4 in (8.6 m)
- Installed power: 18,980 bhp (14.15 MW)
- Propulsion: 2 × MAN 9L 52/55A heavy oil Diesel Engines with one Propeller
- Speed: 20.5 knots (38.0 km/h; 23.6 mph)
- Range: 22,600 nautical miles (41,900 km) @ 16.5 knots (30.6 km/h; 19.0 mph)
- Crew: 10 civilians in reserve status; 26 civilians when activated (Note: Sources conflict on crew size. Polmar (2005, p. 318) and Silverstone (2011, p. 244) both list a crew of 49 civilians. Conversely, NavSource lists a crew of 27 civilians. The RRF Fleet Pamphlet lists a crew of 26 with a supercargo of 22 for a total crew of 48.)

MV Cape Taylor (T-AKR-113) is a roll-on/roll-off (RO/RO) ship with the Ready Reserve Force (RRF) of the United States Department of Transportation's Maritime Administration (MARAD). As of 31 December 2014, her homeport is the Port of Houston in Houston, Texas, and she is on ROS-5 status; she is able to be fully operational within 5 days of being activated. When activated, she becomes part of the United States Navy's Military Sealift Command (MSC).

== Design and construction ==
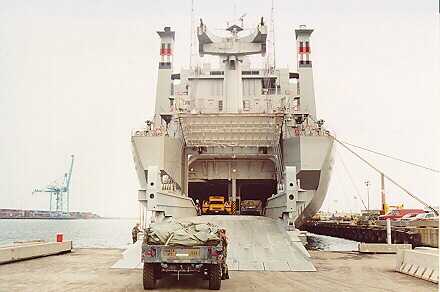
Stern view ramp loading military vehicles

The vessel now known as Cape Taylor was laid down by Sasebo Heavy Industries in Sasebo, Japan in 1977. She is a conventional RO/RO (Vehicle Carrier) ship with the superstructure aft, followed by twin funnels, and a stern ramp. She is 634 ft 3 in (193.3 m) in overall length with a lightweight displacement of 12,141 long tons (12,336 t) and a fully loaded displacement of 26,456 long tons (26,881 t). For carrying US Army and Marine Corps combat vehicles, she has 88,136 sq ft (8,188.1 m^{2}) of cargo capacity. She can carry 340 containers plus vehicles and her hull is ice strengthened.

== Service history ==
=== Commercial service ===
She was launched on 8 July 1977 and began service with DDG Hansa Line as MV Rabenfels. In 1981, the vessel was sold to Lykes Lines who operated her as MV Cygnus. There are also records of her being named MV ASL Cygnus (1992) and MV Thakwini (1993) or MV ASL Cygnus Thakwini.

=== US Government service ===
Cape Taylor was purchased by the US Government in 1992 and acquired on 15 March 1993. On 19 August 1994, she was transferred to MARAD and became part of the Ready Reserve Fleet.

On 23 January 2003, Cape Taylor was activated and placed "In Service" from the Ready Reserve Force to haul military cargo to the Middle East in support of Operation Iraqi Freedom. On 6 June 2003, she was placed "Out of Service" and returned to her Ready Reserve Force lay berth in Houston on a four-day recall status. The Ship is Currently managed by Patriot Contract Services.

On 4 July 2025, Cape Taylor was docked in the Boston Marine Industrial Park. Ship tracking sites indicate she has been in Boston since March.

== Footnotes ==
Notes

Citations
