= SS Cape Jacob =

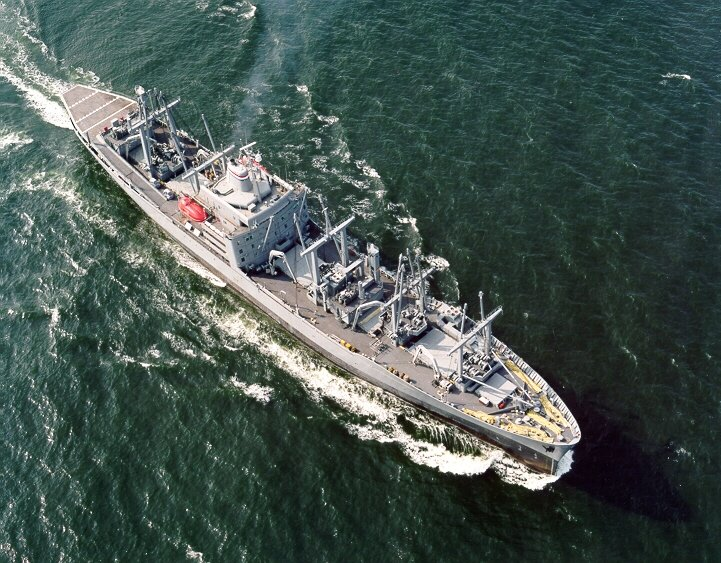
- Cape Jacob underway

History

United States
- Builder: Newport News Shipbuilding and Dry Dock Co., Newport News, VA
- Laid down: 16 January 1961
- Launched: 28 July 1961 as SS California
- Acquired: 18 January 1962, to the Maritime Administration to be operated by States Steamship Company
- Renamed: Cape Jacob (AK-5029)
- Homeport: Guam
- Identification: IMO number: 5057931; MMSI number: 366504000; Callsign: WJBA
- Status: currently mothball fleet in Benicia, California. No longer active and assigned to the Pacific area, Maritime Prepositioning Ship Squadron Three. Normally operates out of Saipan or Guam.

General characteristics
- Class & type: Modular Cargo Delivery System Ship
- Displacement: 8,280 long tons empty, 22,929 tons full
- Length: 565 ft 0 in (172.21 m)
- Beam: 76 ft 2 in (23.22 m)
- Draft: 31 ft 7 in (9.63 m)
- Propulsion: steam turbine, single propeller
- Speed: 17 kn (20 mph; 31 km/h)
- Complement: Full operational status: 35 civilian mariners
- Armament: None
- Aviation facilities: None

The SS Cape Jacob is a steam turbine-driven ship, first launched as the SS California. It was to be used by the Maritime Administration, and was delivered in 1962 and put under contract to the States Steamship Company. The ship was later transferred to the Military Sealift Command, and put into reserve status temporarily. It was then transferred to active duty as a prepositioning ship.
