= SS Cape Inscription =

History

United States
- Owner: United States Maritime Administration
- Builder: Bath Iron Works, Bath, ME
- Laid down: July 1, 1974
- Launched: May 24, 1975
- Acquired: September 8, 1987
- Renamed: SS Cape inscription
- Identification: IMO number: 7390105; MMSI number: 368850000; Callsign: WSCJ
- Status: Laid up as part of the National Defense Reserve Fleet in a layberth at Long Beach, CA. in ROS-5 status. Currently in Long Beach CA

General characteristics
- Class & type: Roll-on/Roll-off ship
- Displacement: 15,000 tons empty, 33,900 tons full
- Length: 655 ft (200 m)
- Beam: 102 feet
- Draft: 32 feet
- Propulsion: Two steam turbines, one propeller
- Speed: 18.7 knots
- Complement: Full operational status 31, reserve status 9
- Armament: None
- Armor: None

The SS Cape Inscription (AKR-5076) was originally launched in 1975 as the SS Maine, a Type C7 commercial ship. The States SS company took the first contract in 1976 and it operated until January 29, 1979, when it was purchased by Whitney National Bank (now Hancock Bank), it was then leased to Lykes Brothers steamship company and renamed the SS Tyson Lykes on February 23, 1979. On October 20 the Lykes Brothers purchased the ship from the Whitney National Bank. Later in September 1987 the ship was reacquired from its commercial roles and brought back under military control under the Maritime Administration and renamed the SS Cape Inscription. Since then it has been kept in ready reserve status and used occasionally for heavy lifting operations to European theaters to have the equipment air-lifted to active engagements.
