= MV Cape Washington =

Cape W-class roll-on/roll-off

Coordinates: 39.2622528°N 76.6024129°W

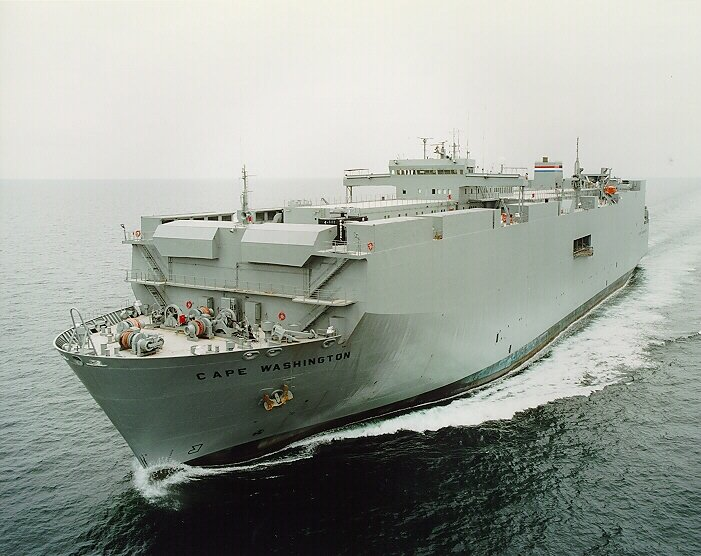
- MV Cape Washington

History

United States
- Name: Cape Washington
- Namesake: Cape Washington
- Owner: Grace Marine Co. S.A.
- Builder: Stocznia im Komuny Partyskiej, Gdynia, Poland (now Stocznia Gdynia)
- Launched: 3 April 1981
- Completed: 1982
- Acquired: 7 April 1993
- Commissioned: 5 April 1994
- Renamed: from Hual Transporter
- Identification: IMO number: 7826178; MMSI number: 303932000; Callsign: WRGH; Pennant number: T-AKR-9961
- Status: Laid at Baltimore, in ROS-5 status

General characteristics
- Class & type: Cape W-class roll-on/roll-off
- Tonnage: 51,960 GT
- Displacement: 53,652 long tons
- Length: 697 feet
- Beam: 105 feet 11 inches
- Draft: 38 feet
- Propulsion: Diesel, single propeller
- Speed: 14.9 knots
- Range: Not Disclosed
- Complement: 27 civilian mariners
- Armament: none
- Armor: none
- Aircraft carried: none

MV Cape Washington (T-AKR-9961) was originally built as a commercial ship in 1982 and sold to the Grace Marine Company with the named Hual Transporter. She has a sister ship named MV Cape Wrath.

== Construction and career ==
It served as a merchant ship until it was purchased by the US Department of Transportation, Maritime Administration on 7 April 1993. From there it was later transferred to the Maritime Administrations Ready reserve fleet and assigned to Maryland. Since then it has been activated to serve in bringing vehicles and supplies to Europe where they are air lifted to troops engaged in Iraq and Afghanistan.
