= MV Cape Vincent =

Ship built in 1984

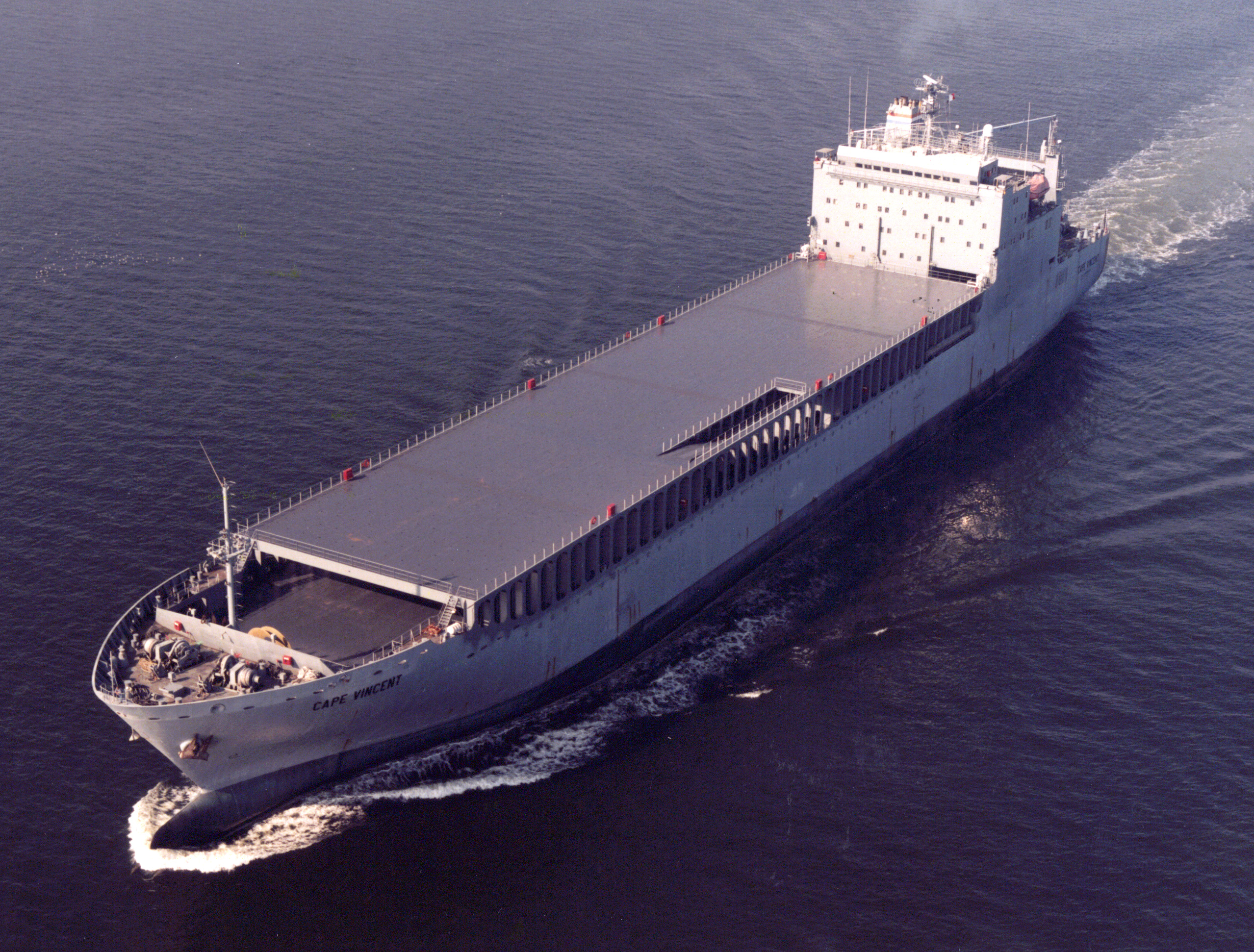
- Cape Vincent (T-AKR-9666)

History

United States
- Name: MV Cape Vincent (T-AKR-9666)
- Builder: Fincantieri, Genoa, Italy
- Launched: 28 March 1984
- Acquired: 1993
- In service: 2 April 1993
- Home port: Beaumont, TX
- Identification: IMO number: 8211291; MMSI number: 303924000; Callsign: KAES
- Status: In ready reserve since 1994. Four days are needed to activate.
- Notes: Built as the MV Marzario Italia

General characteristics
- Class & type: Cape V Class roll-on/roll-off ship
- Displacement: 30,644 short tons (27,800 t) tons
- Length: 631 ft 0 in (192.33 m)
- Beam: 87 ft 0 in (26.52 m)
- Draft: 28 ft 4 in (8.64 m)
- Propulsion: one slow speed diesel engine, 9,184 hp, one propeller
- Speed: 14 kn (16 mph; 26 km/h)
- Capacity: 26,690 sq. ft. vehicle space or 1,306 standard containers
- Complement: Full Operational Status: 25 civilian mariners
- Armament: 12 Man Force Protection Team
- Aviation facilities: In an emergency helicopters can land on the vessel's spar deck

MV Cape Vincent (T-AKR-9666) was built as MV Marzario Italia in 1984 at Italcantieri, Italy. After launch, it was delivered to CMB Italy after which it was briefly renamed Taabo Italia. She was acquired on 13 May 1993 by the US Department of Transportation, Maritime Administration and renamed Cape Vincent, on 1 February 1994, assigned to the Maritime Administration's Ready Reserve Force ships. Cape Vincent is operated by Patriot Contract Services. When activated, Cape Vincent is one of the Maritime Administration's 31 roll-on/roll-off Reserve Force ships assigned to the US Navy's Military Sealift Command (MSC) Sealift Program Office. Cape Vincent is nested at the National Defense Reserve Fleet, Beaumont, Texas, in ROS-5 status, with a 10-man maintenance crew on board.

== History ==
After reflagging, Cape Vincent entered the RRF in Reduced Operating Status – 4 (ROS-4) on 19 August 1994. The vessel is required to be ready for tender to COMSC within 96 hours of an activation notice. The ten-person ROS crew performs continuous maintenance in order to maintain the vessel in class with the American Bureau of Shipping and fully certificated by the USCG.

As an ROS-4 vessel, Cape Vincent conducts an annual maintenance activation. This at-sea operational period enhances the material condition of her plant. Cape Vincent is currently in ROS-5 status.

=== Cargo capability ===
From June through November 1998, Cape Vincent and her sister vessel Cape Victory were modified by the addition of a new spar deck. This increased the overall militarily useful sq. ft capacity of each vessel. The two CAPE V class ships function the same in their ability to load wheeled and tracked vehicles via the stern ramp. Cape Vincent's most notable feature is its total deck capacity consisting of 156,524 square feet (14,541.6 m^{2}), of which 126,084 is militarily useful. Cape Vincent has 126,084 sq ft of heavy deck strength (over 525 psf with 13 f. clearances) and 30,440 sq ft of light deck. In addition, Cape Victory has 100 450-volt reefer outlets.

=== Operations ===
Within one month of entering the RRF, on 9 September 1994, the Cape Vincent loaded cargo at Wilmington, North Carolina, and departed for Port-au-Prince, Haiti. Cape Vincent supported Operation Uphold Democracy, a peace-keeping mission, for 104 days before returning to Beaumont, Texas. Following her return from Uphold Democracy she returned to her layberth and was next activated on 25 December 1994, for Fuertas Defensas 95, providing 45 days of transport for outsized unit equipment to Guatemala in support of military training. This was part of a larger exercise which included the Army's Battlefield Visualization initiative in Panama.

On 4 September 1996, Cape Vincent underwent a test of her activation readiness capability and successfully activated in 1.9 days. Cape Vincent surpassed this record, activating in 1.8 days for a humanitarian relief effort to Central America in response to the damage caused by Hurricane Mitch. Cape Vincent transported construction equipment and relief supplies for 108 days. On 30 March 1999, Cape Vincent received the Maritime Administrator's Professional Ship Award in recognition of her service.

The Cape Vincent was activated on 17 January 2003 for Operation Iraqi Freedom and loaded cargo from the 4th Infantry Division at the Port of Beaumont. The ship spent a total of 118 days in Full Operating Service (FOS), discharging cargo in Kuwait, loading in Turkey, discharging in Rotterdam and returning to Beaumont on 16 May 2003. Cape Vincent was active moving military equipment to Kuwait and back until the latter part of 2008. In 2005, Cape Vincent was on charter to FEMA providing relief to victims of Hurricane Katrina in New Orleans. Cape Vincent is located in the Beaumont Reserve Fleet in Reduced Operating Status with a crew of 10. operated by Keystone Shipping until Jan 2016. Patriot Contract Services took over operations in February 2016.

Cape Vincent moved to the Marad Reserve Fleet in Beaumont, Texas, in August 2009 along with her sister ship Cape Victory, saving the US Government approximately $1 million per year.

On April 22, 2026, Cape Vincent arrived in the Port of Corpus Christi, Texas.
