= SS Gem State =

Crane ship in Ready Reserve for the United States Navy

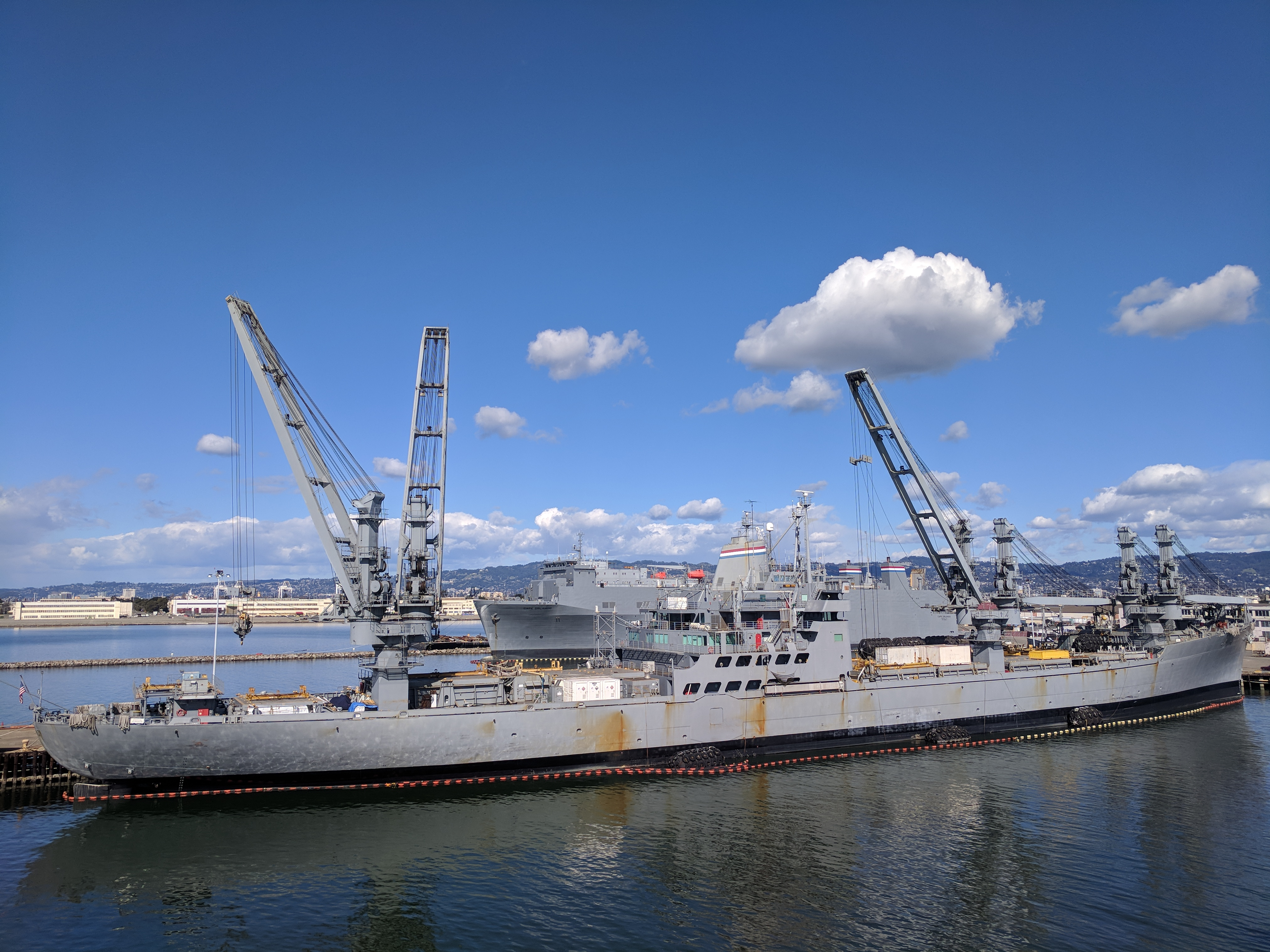
- SS Gem State (T-ACS-2)

History

United States
- Name: SS Gem State (T-ACS-2)
- Builder: National Steel and Shipbuilding, San Diego, CA
- Laid down: 10 February 1965
- Launched: 30 May 1965
- Acquired: 7 May 1984
- Home port: Alameda, CA
- Identification: IMO number: 6520911; MMSI number: 366451000; Callsign: WLDK
- Status: In ready reserve since 1984. Five days needed to activate.
- Notes: Launched as SS President Monroe

General characteristics
- Class & type: Keystone State-class crane ship
- Displacement: 31,500 tons
- Length: 668 ft 5 in (203.73 m)
- Beam: 76 ft 1 in (23.19 m)
- Draft: 33 ft 6 in (10.21 m)
- Propulsion: two boilers, two steam turbines, single propeller, 17,500shp
- Speed: 17 kn (20 mph; 31 km/h)
- Capacity: 300+ Cargo Containers
- Complement: Full Operational Status: 37 civilian mariners Reduced Operational Status: 10 civilian mariners
- Armament: None
- Aviation facilities: None

SS Gem State (T-ACS-2) is a crane ship in Ready Reserve for the United States Navy. The ship was named for the state of Idaho, which is also known as the Gem State.

== History ==
Gem State was laid down on 30 May 1965, as a combination breakbulk-container ship, SS President Monroe, ON 501712, IMO 6520911, a Maritime Administration type (C6-S-1qa) hull, under MARAD contract (MA 165). Built by National Steel and Shipbuilding Company, San Diego, CA, hull no. 340, she was launched on 10 February 1965 and delivered to MARAD on 25 April 1966, for service with American President Lines. She was converted to a MARAD type (C6-S-1qc) container ship, in 1973, and continued to be operated by APL until delivered to the Maritime Administration in 1982 for lay up in the National Defense Reserve Fleet (NDRF). In 1984–1985 she was converted to a type (C6-S-MA1qd) Crane Ship by Continental Marine, San Francisco, CA. She was placed in service as SS Gem State (ACS-2) 7 May 1984, assigned to the Military Sealift Command (MSC) Ready Reserve Force, (RRF). Gem State is one of 10 Crane Ships in the Surge Force and is berthed at Ready Reserve Fleet Alameda, assigned to Maritime Prepositioning Ship Squadron Three and is maintained in a five-day readiness status (ROS 5).
