= MV Cape Texas =

American military cargo ship

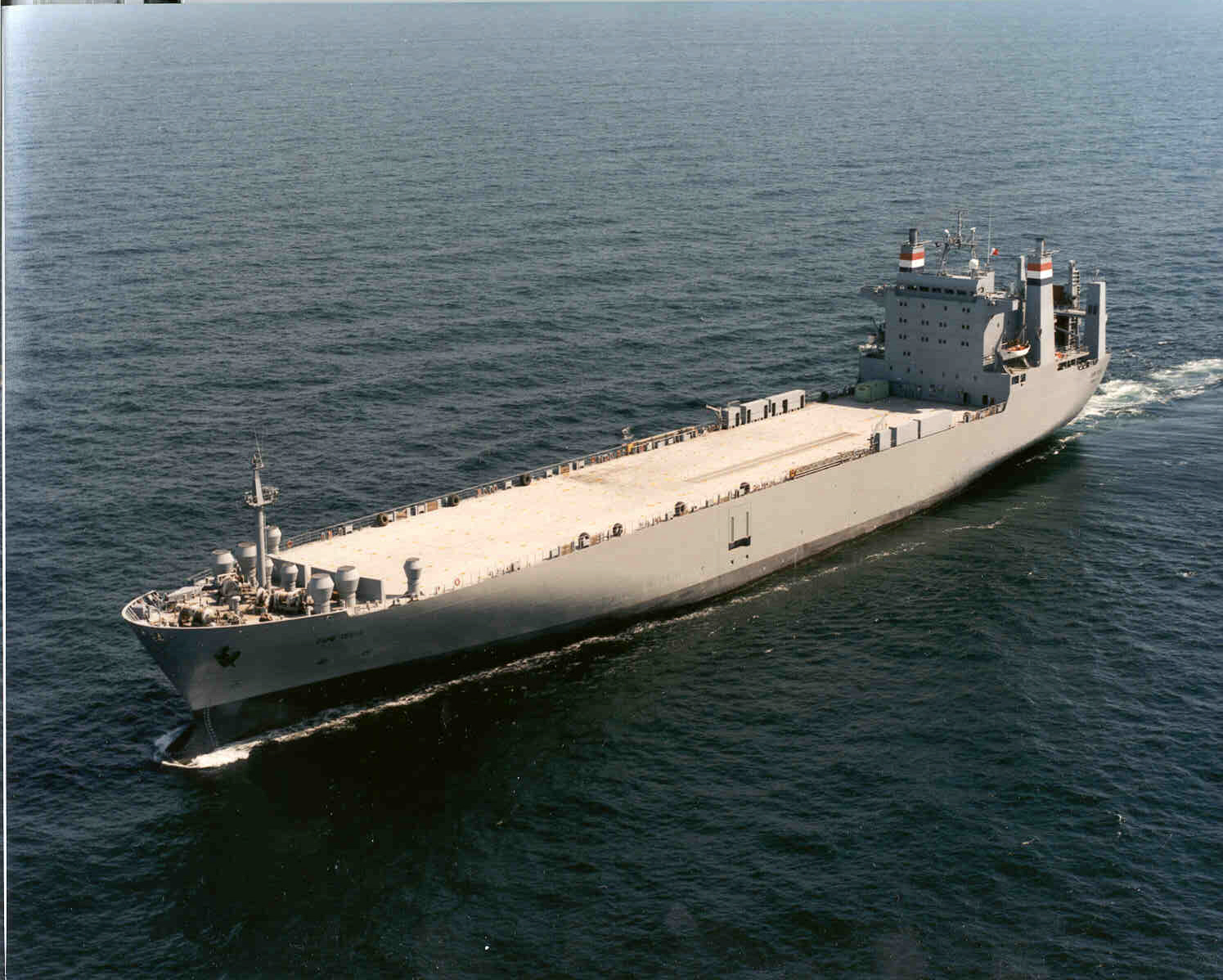
- Cape Texas at sea

History
- Name: MV Cape Texas (T-AKR-112)
- Owner: United States Department of Transportation
- Operator: United States Maritime Administration
- Builder: Howaldtswerke-Deutsche Werft, Kiel, Germany
- Launched: 16 June 1977
- Acquired: 21 January 1993
- In service: 19 August 1994
- Home port: Houston, Texas
- Identification: IMO number: 7602247; MMSI number: 368952000; Callsign: WSDG
- Status: RRF; ROS-5 status
- Notes: When activated, Cape Texas comes under the operational control of the Military Sealift Command.

General characteristics
- Class & type: Cape T-class Roll-on/roll-off (Vehicle Carrier) ship
- Displacement: 24,555 long tons (24,949 t)
- Length: 634 ft 3 in (193.3 m)
- Beam: 88 ft 7 in (27.0 m)
- Height: 161 ft 5 in (49.2 m)
- Draft: 28 ft 3 in (8.6 m)
- Installed power: 18,980 bhp (14.15 MW)
- Propulsion: 2 × MAN 9L 52/55A heavy oil Diesel Engines with one Propeller
- Speed: 20.5 knots (38.0 km/h; 23.6 mph)
- Range: 22,600 nautical miles (41,900 km) @ 16.5 knots (30.6 km/h; 19.0 mph)
- Crew: 10 civilians in reserve status; 26 civilians when activated (Note: Sources conflict on crew size. Polmar (2005, p. 318) and Silverstone (2011, p. 244) both list a crew of 49 civilians. Conversely, NavSource lists a crew of 27 civilians. The RRF Fleet Pamphlet lists a crew of 26 with a supercargo of 14 for a total crew of 40.)

For MV Cape Texas, a World War II Type C1-A, see Type C1 ships

MV Cape Texas (T-AKR-112) is a Roll-on/Roll-off (RO/RO) ship with the Ready Reserve Force (RRF) of the United States Department of Transportation's Maritime Administration (MARAD). As of 31 December 2014, her homeport is the Port of Beaumont in Beaumont, Texas, and she is on ROS-5 status; she is able to be fully operational within 5 days of being activated. When activated, she becomes part of the United States Navy's Military Sealift Command (MSC).

== Design and construction ==
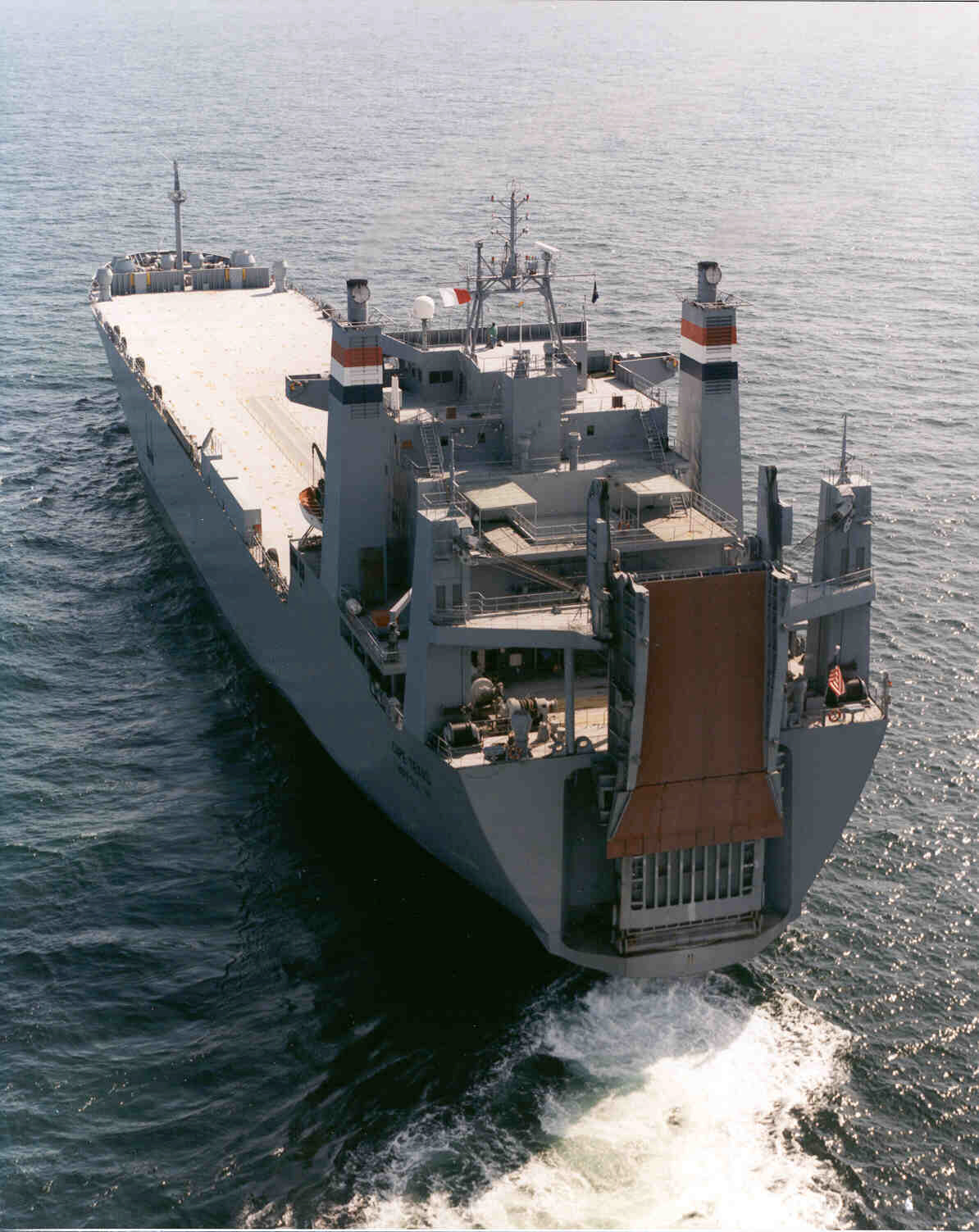
Stern view of MV Cape Texas (T-AKR-112) as sea

The vessel now known as Cape Texas was laid down by Howaldtswerke-Deutsche Werft in Kiel, Germany. She is a conventional RO/RO (Vehicle Carrier) ship with the superstructure aft, followed by twin funnels, and a stern ramp. She is 634 ft 3 in (193.3 m) in overall length with a lightweight displacement of 9,687 long tons (9,842 t) and a fully loaded displacement of 24,555 long tons (24,949 t). For carrying US Army and Marine Corps combat vehicles, she has 88,136 sq ft (8,188.1 m^{2}) of cargo capacity. She can carry 340 containers plus vehicles and her hull is ice strengthened.

== Service history ==
=== Commercial Service ===
She was launched on 16 June 1977 and began service with DDG Hansa Line as MV Reichenfels. In 1981, the vessel was sold to Lykes Lines who operated her as MV Lyra.

=== US Government Service ===
Cape Texas was purchased by the US Government in 1992 and acquired on 21 January 1993. She initially operated in MSC service as the USNS Lyra. On 19 August 1994, she was transferred to MARAD and became part of the Ready Reserve Fleet.

On 23 January 2003, Cape Texas was activated and placed "In Service" from the Ready Reserve Force to haul military cargo to the Middle East in support of Operation Iraqi Freedom. She proceeded to Corpus Christi, Texas, to load military vehicles and equipment. On 2 May 2003, she was placed "Out of Service" and returned to her Ready Reserve Force lay berth in Houston on a four-day recall status.

On 26 December 2004, she was again activated to MSC in continued support of Operation Iraqi Freedom. She was returned to the Ready Reserve Force on 7 April 2005 and returned to Houston.

== Footnotes ==
Notes

Citations
