= MV Cape Rise =

History
- Name: MV Cape Rise
- Owner: Maritime Administration (MARAD)
- Builder: Kawasaki Heavy Industries Ltd., Japan
- Acquired: August 9, 1993
- Identification: IMO number: 7530808; MMSI number: 366839000; Callsign: KAFG

General characteristics
- Class & type: MV Cape Rise (T-AKR-9678)
- Displacement: 35,350 tons
- Length: 648 ft 6 in (197.66 m)
- Beam: 105 ft (32 m)
- Draft: 32 ft (9.8 m)
- Propulsion: two Diesel engines

The MV Cape Rise (T-AKR-9678), formerly Saudi Riyadh, formerly Seaspeed Arabia, is a roll-on/roll-off (RO/RO) and container ship built in 1977.

Built in Japan in 1977 by Kawasaki Heavy Industries, Limited, the ship was delivered to Ro-Ro Charterers Corporation as MV SEASPEED ARABIA. Later renamed SAUDI RIYADH, she was purchased by the U.S. Maritime Administration (MARAD) in August 1993 and was subsequently converted for military use at Bethlehem Steel's Sparrows Point Shipyard at Baltimore, Maryland.

Renamed MV CAPE RISE (T-AKR 9678), she was assigned to the MARAD's Ready Reserve Force (RRF) on November 21, 1994. Since then, she is maintained in reduced operating status (ROS) in a layberth at Portsmouth, Virginia with a maintenance crew of nine (9) commercial mariners. If required, MV CAPE RISE can be fully activated within 5 days.

The Ready Reserve Force (RRF) is a subset of vessels within MARAD's National Defense Reserve Fleet (NDRF), ready to support the rapid worldwide deployment of U.S. military forces. As a key element of Department of Defense (DOD) strategic sealift, the RRF provides U.S. ships crewed by U.S. sailors and primarily supports transport of U.S. Army and U.S. Marine Corps unit equipment, combat support equipment, and initial resupply during critical surge periods—the period of time before commercial ships can be secured for similar support. The RRF provides nearly 50% of U.S. government-owned surge sealift capability and currently consists of 46 vessels, 35 of which are RO/RO. The RRF program was initiated in 1976 and is defined by a Memorandum of Agreement (MOA) between the U.S. Department of Defense (DOD) and the U.S. Department of Transportation (DOT). To date, the RRF has experienced hundreds of vessel activations, with dozens per year supporting a variety of humanitarian, natural disaster, and military operations.
