= SS Diamond State =

Crane ship in the National Defense Reserve Fleet for the United States Navy

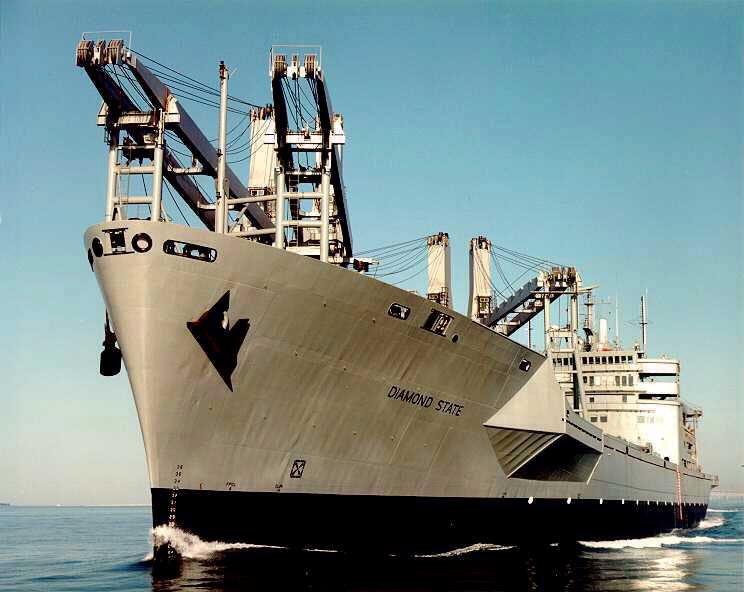
- SS Diamond State (T-ACS-7)

History

United States
- Name: Diamond State
- Builder: Todd Shipyards, Los Angeles Division, California
- Laid down: 1961
- Launched: 11 May 1961
- Acquired: 1989
- In service: 4 March 1965
- Out of service: 28 July 2006
- Identification: IMO number: 5170185; MMSI number: 366476000; Callsign: WLRL; Hull number: T-ACS-7
- Status: National Defense Reserve Fleet -Disposal
- Notes: Launched as SS Japan Mail

General characteristics
- Class & type: Keystone State-class crane ship
- Displacement: 31,500 tons
- Length: 668 ft 5 in (203.73 m)
- Beam: 76 ft 1 in (23.19 m)
- Draft: 33 ft 6 in (10.21 m)
- Propulsion: two Combustion Engineering boilers two General Electric geared turbines single propeller, 10,747shp
- Speed: 17 knots (31 km/h; 20 mph)
- Capacity: 300+ cargo containers
- Complement: Full operational status: 89 civilian mariners Reduced operational status: 10 civilian mariners

SS Diamond State (T-ACS-7) is a crane ship in the National Defense Reserve Fleet (NRDF) for the United States Navy. The ship was named for the state of Delaware, which is also known as the "Diamond State". The ship was initially a bulk freighter named SS Japan Mail when launched in 1961 and entered service in 1962 with the American Mail Line. In 1971, the ship was lengthened and renamed SS President Truman. In 1987, the vessel was taken over by MARAD and converted to a crane ship and in 1989, renamed Diamond State.

== History ==
Diamond State was laid down on 22 November 1960, as the break-bulk freighter SS Japan Mail, ON 287976, IMO 5170185, a Maritime Administration type (C4-S-1s) hull, under MARAD contract (MA 87). Built by Todd Shipyards, Los Angeles Division, San Pedro, Los Angeles, California, hull no. 78, she was launched on 8 August 1961 and delivered to MARAD on 19 April 1962, entering service for American Mail Line (AML), a subsidiary of American President Lines (APL). In 1971 she was lengthened and converted to a type (C6-S-1a) hull container ship by Bethlehem Steel, San Francisco, California. On 14 November 1975, the ship was renamed President Truman, after AML was merged into APL. She was returned to MARAD on 21 January 1987, and placed in the National Defense Reserve Fleet (NDRF). In 1988 the ship was converted to a type (C6-S-1aq) crane ship, completed 15 December 1988, and assigned to the Ready Reserve Force, (RRF), under operation control of Military Sealift Command (MSC) and placed in service as SS Diamond State (ACS-7), 22 February 1989. Diamond State is one of 10 crane ships in the Surge Force and was berthed at Houston, Texas. and assigned to Maritime Prepositioning Ship Squadron Three and was maintained in a five-day readiness status (ROS 5). She was removed from MSC control, withdrawn from the RRF by reassignment to the NDRF (Beaumont, Texas) on 28 July 2006.
