= USNS Cesar Chavez =

Cargo ship of the United States Navy

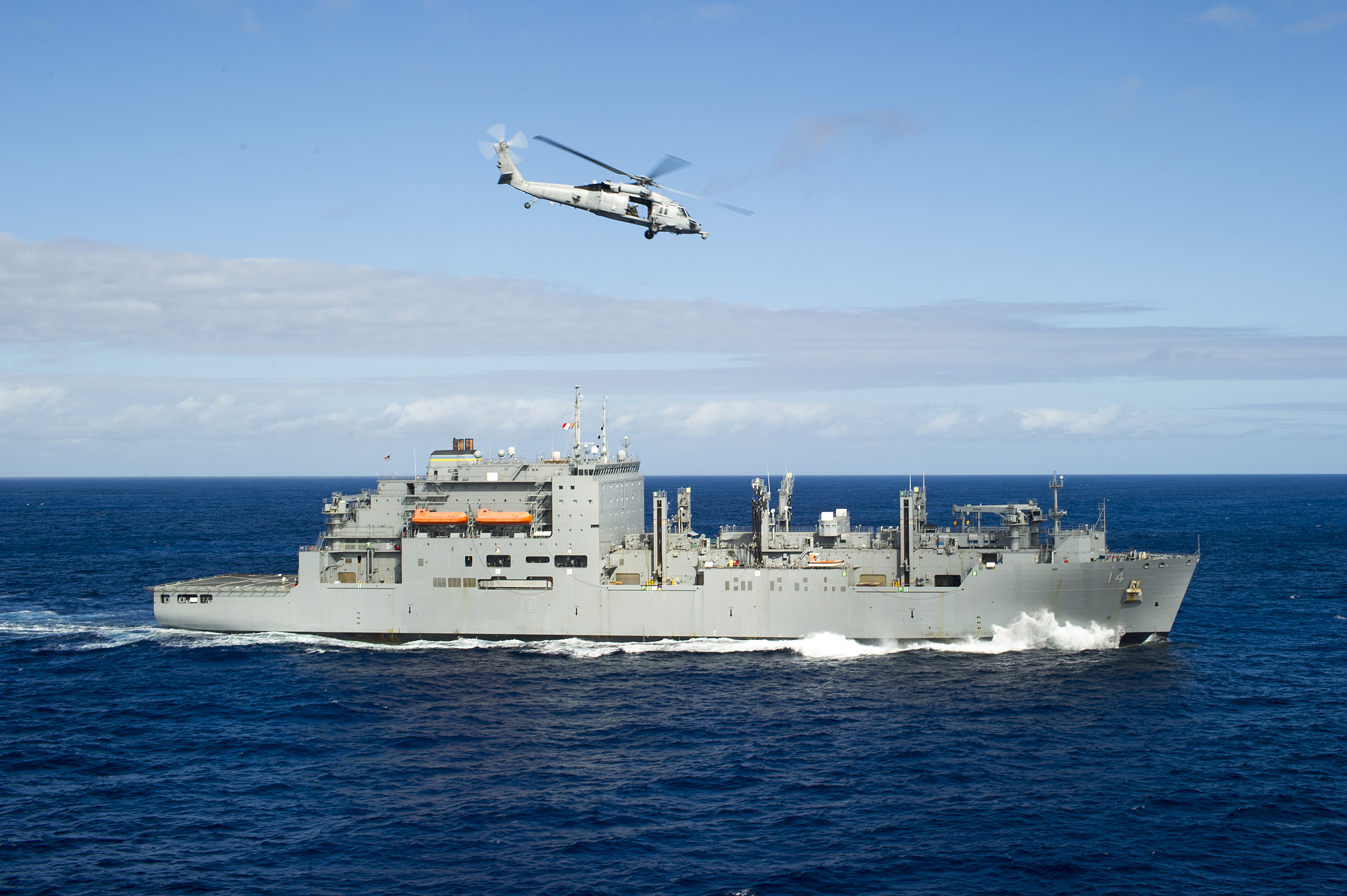
- USNS Cesar Chavez in December 2014

History
- Namesake: César Chávez
- Awarded: 26 February 2010
- Builder: National Steel and Shipbuilding
- Laid down: 9 May 2011
- Launched: 5 May 2012
- Sponsored by: Helen Chavez
- Christened: 5 May 2012
- In service: 24 October 2012
- Identification: IMO number: 9593127; MMSI number: 369989000; Callsign: NCCZ
- Status: in active service
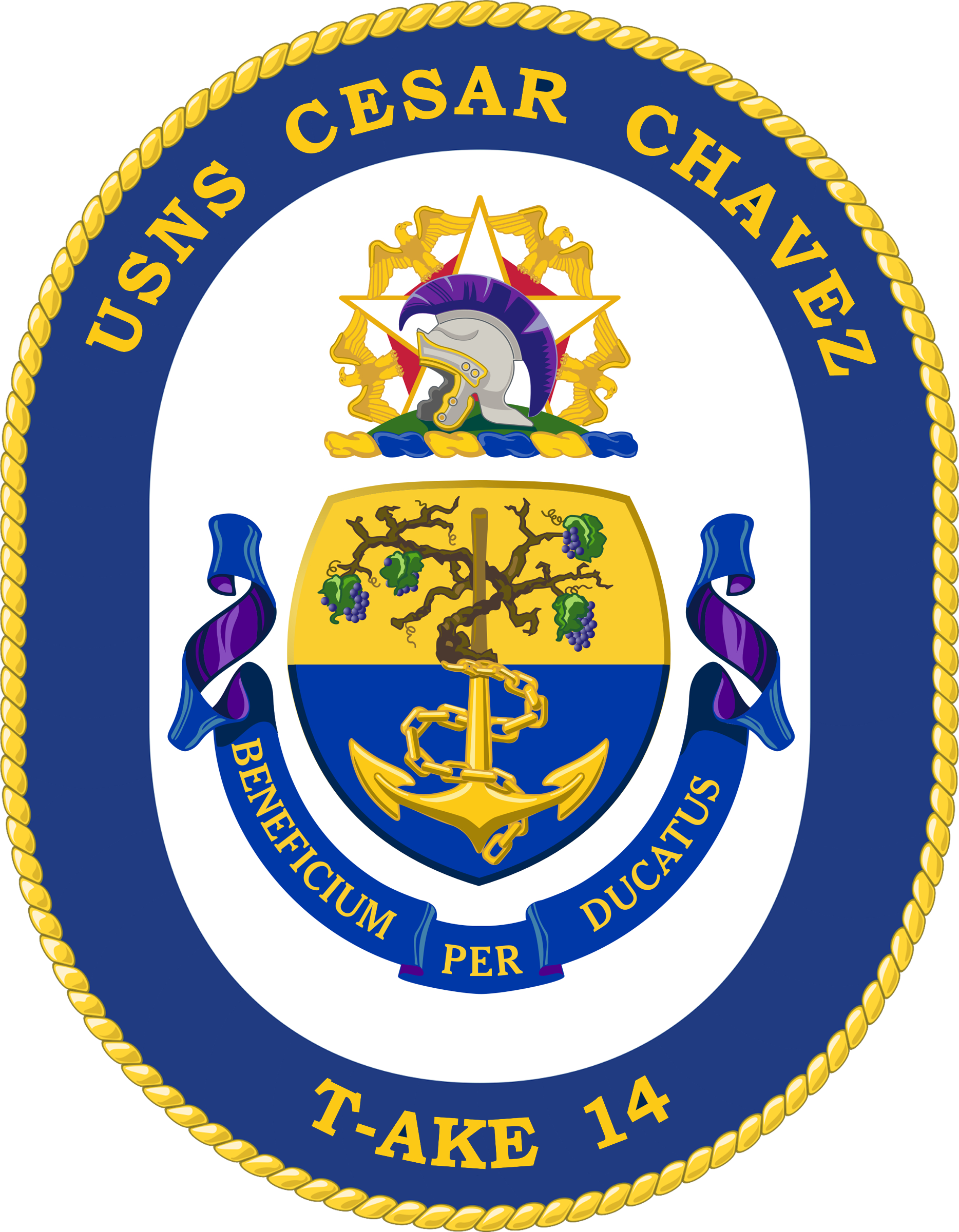
- Badge

General characteristics
- Class & type: Lewis and Clark-class cargo ship
- Displacement: 41,000 tons (41,700 t)
- Length: 689 ft (210 m)
- Beam: 105.6 ft (32.2 m)
- Draft: 29.9 ft (9.1 m)
- Propulsion: Integrated propulsion and ship service electrical system, with generation at 6.6 kV by FM/MAN B&W diesel generators; one fixed pitch propeller; bow thruster
- Speed: 20 knots (37 km/h)
- Range: 14,000 nmi (26,000 km; 16,000 mi) at 20 knots (37 km/h; 23 mph)
- Capacity: Max dry cargo weight: 5,910 LT (6,000 t); Max dry cargo volume: 783,000 cu ft (22,200 m^{3}); Max cargo fuel weight: 2,350 LT (2,390 t); Cargo fuel volume: 18,000 bbl (2,900 m^{3})
- Complement: 49 military, 123 civilian
- Aircraft carried: Two helicopters

USNS Cesar Chavez (T-AKE-14) is a Lewis and Clark-class dry cargo ship of the United States Navy's Military Sealift Command. The fourteenth and final ship of her class, she was built by General Dynamics National Steel and Shipbuilding Company (NASSCO) in San Diego and delivered in October 2012. She is the first Navy ship named for César Chávez (1927–1993), who served in the Navy during World War II before becoming a labor leader and civil rights activist. As part of the Combat Logistics Force, her primary mission is to deliver ammunition, food, fuel, and other dry cargo to U.S. and allied ships at sea.

== Naming ==
On 18 May 2011, Secretary of the Navy Ray Mabus formally announced at the NASSCO shipyard that the final Lewis and Clark-class ship would be named after Chávez, continuing the class's tradition of honoring American pioneers and explorers. Workers at the NASSCO shipyard, approximately 60 percent of whom were Hispanic, had requested that the ship bear Chávez's name. Chávez enlisted in the Navy at the age of seventeen in 1944 and served for two years.

The naming drew criticism from Representative Duncan D. Hunter (R-CA), who argued that it was more of a political statement than a reflection of naval tradition, and suggested the ship should instead honor a military combat veteran such as Marine Rafael Peralta. Supporters of the decision, including Senator Barbara Boxer (D-CA), said it was consistent with the Navy's tradition of honoring pioneers and explorers.

== Construction and delivery ==
Cesar Chavez's keel was laid down on 9 May 2011 at the NASSCO shipyard in San Diego. The ship was christened and launched on 5 May 2012, in what was described as the last stern launch of a ship in North America for the foreseeable future. Helen Fabela Chavez, the widow of the ship's namesake, served as the ship's sponsor and broke the ceremonial champagne bottle across the bow; more than 7,000 people attended the ceremony, including nearly 500 members of the Chávez family. Juan M. Garcia III, Assistant Secretary of the Navy (Manpower and Reserve Affairs), delivered the principal address.

General Dynamics NASSCO delivered Cesar Chavez to the Navy on 24 October 2012, completing the 14-ship T-AKE program that had spanned more than a decade. Rear Admiral Mark H. Buzby, commander of the Military Sealift Command, said the delivery brought MSC to full capacity with its dry-cargo and ammunition ships. The ship entered non-commissioned service with MSC, crewed primarily by civil service mariners, and was assigned to the United States Pacific Fleet.

== Search for Malaysia Airlines Flight 370 ==
In April 2014, the U.S. Seventh Fleet deployed Cesar Chavez to join an international task force led by the Australian Defence Force searching for Malaysia Airlines Flight 370, which had disappeared on 8 March 2014 with 239 people aboard. The ship was sent in response to a request from the Australian Joint Operations Command to U.S. Pacific Command for tanker support. After loading provisions and fuel in Singapore, Cesar Chavez conducted underway replenishment operations with Australian naval vessels in the southern Indian Ocean, including HMAS Success, HMAS Perth, and HMAS Toowoomba. The ship also took on additional supplies at Fleet Base West in Stirling, Western Australia, to further support the search.

== 2025 renaming controversy ==
In mid-2025, the ship was reported to be among several Navy vessels under consideration for renaming as part of a broader effort by the Trump administration and Defense Secretary Pete Hegseth to rename ships named after social movement figures in favor of names reflecting what the administration described as a "warrior ethos." Other ships considered for renaming included the USNS Harvey Milk, USNS Thurgood Marshall, and USNS Ruth Bader Ginsburg. Representatives Sam Liccardo and Gil Cisneros, both California Democrats, led a letter co-signed by 22 congressional colleagues urging Hegseth to preserve the ship's name, citing Chávez's Navy service and established naming criteria. In an August 2025 memo, Navy Secretary John C. Phelan confirmed that there were "no plans to rename USNS César Chavez."

== Response to 2026 sexual abuse allegations ==
In March 2026, The New York Times published an investigation alleging that Chávez had sexually abused women and girls over the course of decades, including UFW co-founder Dolores Huerta. On 19 March, Representative Tim Burchett (R-TN) sent a letter to Defense Secretary Hegseth requesting that the ship be renamed, writing that Chávez's name no longer reflected "American values." A Pentagon spokesperson responded on X, writing "We are on it, Congressman." The Democratic lawmakers who had defended the ship's name months earlier did not comment on the new developments and removed their earlier press releases and social media posts on the subject.

== See also ==
- List of monuments and memorials to Cesar Chavez
