= USS Peterson =

USS Peterson may refer to the following ships of the United States Navy:

- USS Peterson (DE-152), a destroyer escort that saw action during World War II and was struck in 1973
- USS Peterson (DD-969), a Spruance-class destroyer that served from 1977 to 2002

== See also ==
- USS Dale W. Peterson (DE-337)
- USNS Oscar V. Peterson (T-AO-206)
