= USS Dale W. Peterson =

U.S. Navy Edsall-class destroyer escort

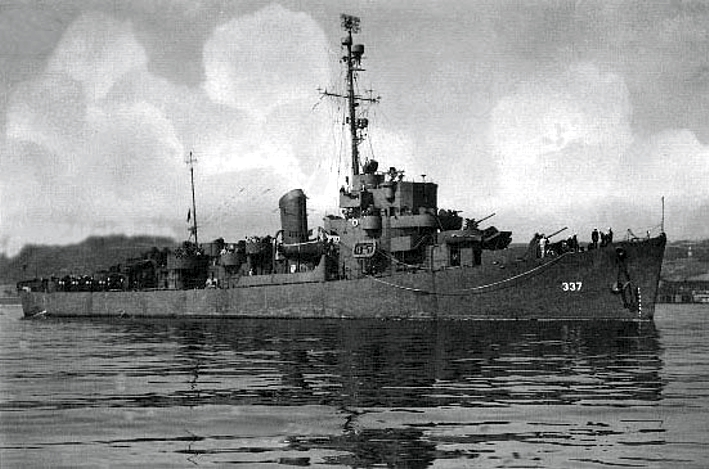
- USS Dale W. Peterson (DE-337)

History

United States
- Namesake: Dale William Peterson
- Builder: Consolidated Steel Corporation, Orange, Texas
- Laid down: 25 October 1943
- Launched: 22 December 1943
- Commissioned: 17 February 1944
- Decommissioned: 27 March 1946
- Stricken: 2 January 1971
- Fate: Sold for scrapping on 10 April 1972.

General characteristics
- Class & type: Edsall-class destroyer escort
- Displacement: 1,253 tons standard; 1,590 tons full load
- Length: 306 feet (93.27 m)
- Beam: 36.58 feet (11.15 m)
- Draft: 10.42 full load feet (3.18 m)
- Propulsion: 4 FM diesel engines, 4 diesel-generators, 6,000 shp (4.5 MW), 2 screws
- Speed: 21 knots (39 km/h)
- Range: 9,100 nmi. at 12 knots; (17,000 km at 22 km/h)
- Complement: 8 officers, 201 enlisted
- Armament: 3 × single 3 in (76 mm)/50 guns; 1 × twin 40 mm AA guns; 8 × single 20 mm AA guns; 1 × triple 21 in (533 mm) torpedo tubes; 8 × depth charge projectors; 1 × depth charge projector (hedgehog); 2 × depth charge tracks

USS Dale W. Peterson (DE–337) was an Edsall class destroyer escort of the United States Navy.

== Namesake ==
Dale William Peterson was born 18 November 1919 in St. Joseph, Missouri. He enlisted in the United States Naval Reserve on 26 March 1940 for aviation training. Commissioned as Ensign on 5 April 1941, he reported to Fighting Squadron 6 on 12 May 1941. He was killed in action on 8 May 1942 during the Battle of the Coral Sea. He was awarded the Navy Cross for intercepting Japanese bombers attacking his aircraft carrier on 20 February 1942, and was posthumously awarded the Distinguished Flying Cross for his actions during the Battle of the Coral Sea

== History ==
Dale W. Peterson (DE-337) was launched 22 December 1943 by Consolidated Steel Corporation, Orange, Texas; sponsored by Mrs. N. F. Peterson, mother of Ensign Peterson; and commissioned 17 February 1944.

Arriving at Norfolk 19 April 1944 Dale W. Peterson was assigned to train nucleus crews. Between 1 July and 27 September she made two trans-Atlantic voyages escorting convoys to the Mediterranean, then from 1 November 1944 to 3 June 1945 Dale W. Peterson operated between New York, the United Kingdom and France, making five crossings. She sailed from New York on 24 June, for training at Guantanamo Bay, Cuba, and the West Coast, arriving at San Diego on 1 August. Underway the next day for Pearl Harbor she arrived as the war in the Pacific was fast coming to a close and on 2 September, the day of signing of the Japanese surrender, Dale W. Peterson was ordered to return to the East Coast. On 29 October she arrived at Green Cove Springs, Florida, and was placed out of commission, in reserve there on 27 March 1946.

== Fate ==
Dale W. Peterson was struck from the Navy list on 2 January 1971 and sold on 10 April 1972 for scrapping.

== See also ==
- USS Peterson, for similar named ships
- Albert Bigelow
