= USNS Oscar V. Peterson =

John Lewis-class oiler of the United States Navy

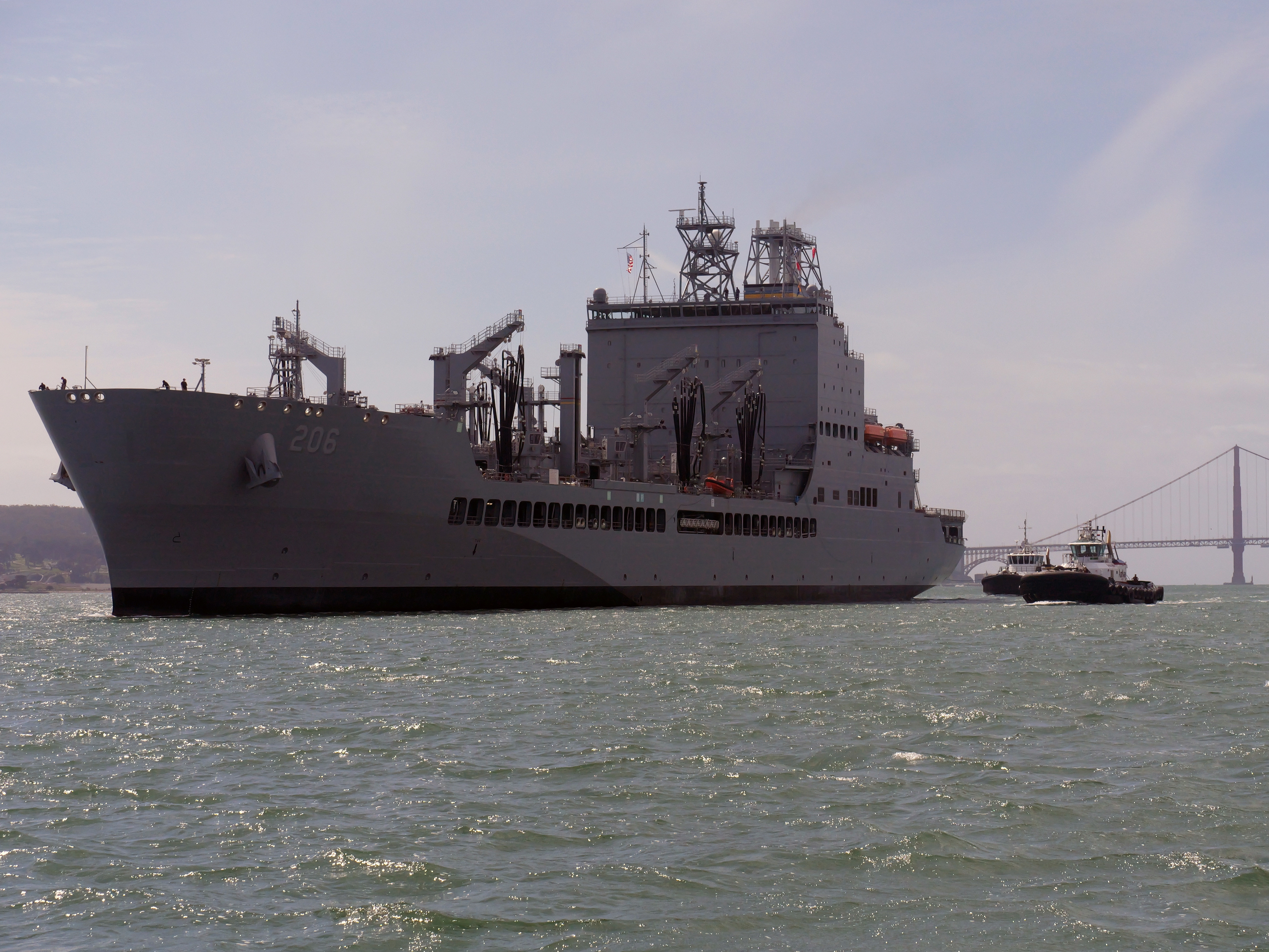
- USNS Harvey Milk in San Francisco Bay, 28 March 2024.

History

United States
- Name: Oscar V. Peterson
- Namesake: Oscar V. Peterson
- Awarded: 30 June 2016
- Builder: National Steel and Shipbuilding Company
- Laid down: 3 September 2020
- Launched: 6 November 2021
- Sponsored by: Paula Neira
- Christened: 6 November 2021
- In service: 11 July 2023
- Renamed: 2025: from Harvey Milk to Oscar V. Peterson
- Identification: Hull number: T-AO-206; IMO number: 9838773; MMSI number: 369914054; Callsign: NHMK
- Motto: For Others
- Status: In active service
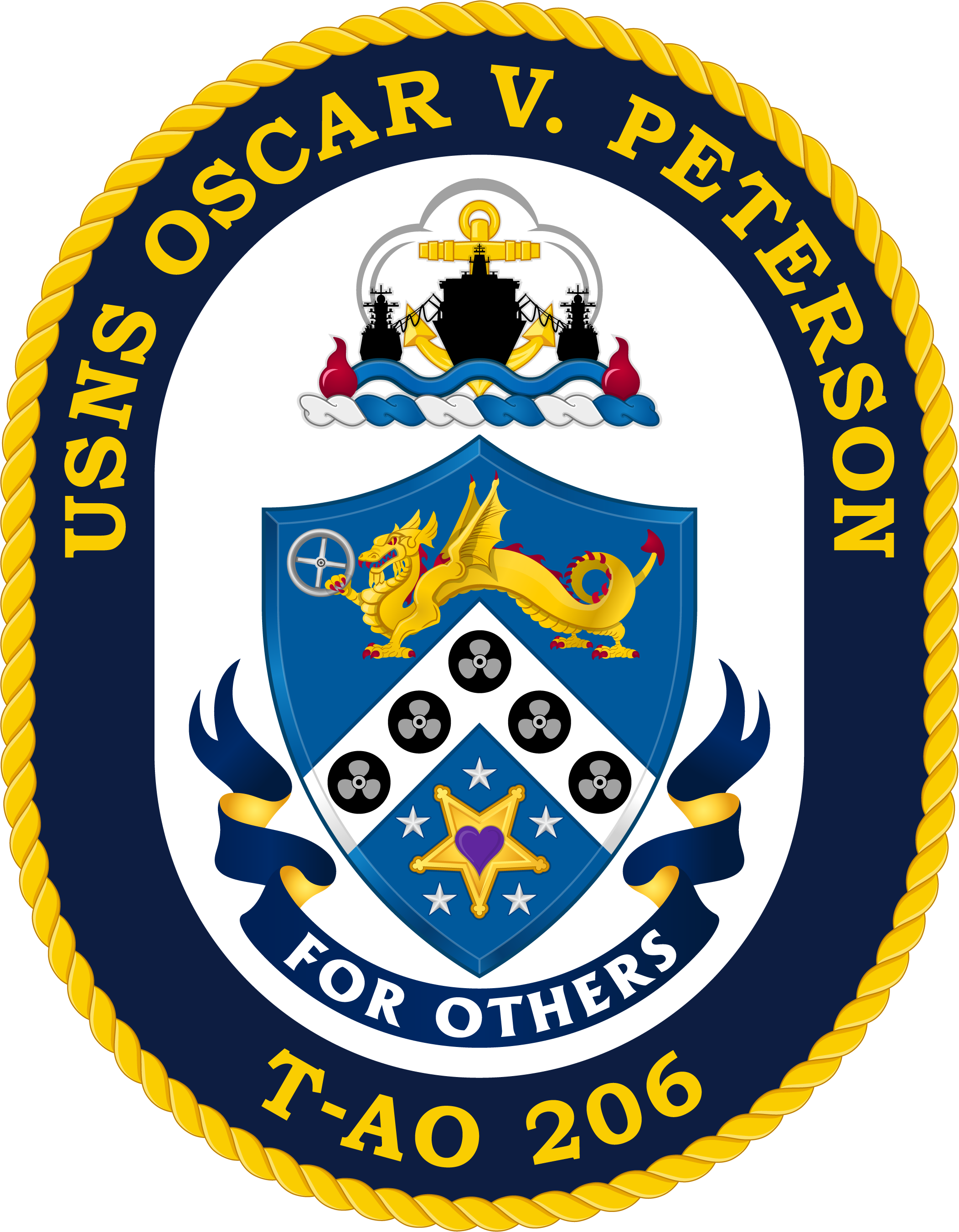
- Badge

General characteristics
- Class & type: John Lewis-class replenishment oiler
- Displacement: 22,515 t (22,159 long tons) (Light ship)
- Length: 746 ft (227 m)
- Beam: 106 ft (32 m)
- Draft: 33.5 ft (10.2 m)
- Speed: 20 knots (37 km/h; 23 mph)
- Complement: 99 civilian mariners (CIVMARS)

USNS Oscar V. Peterson (T-AO-206) is the second of the John Lewis class of underway replenishment oilers, operated by the Military Sealift Command (MSC) to support ships of the United States Navy. Placed in service in 2023, the vessel was originally named Harvey Milk in honor of gay rights activist, and US Navy veteran Harvey Milk. On 27 June 2025, U.S. Secretary of Defense Pete Hegseth announced that Harvey Milk would be renamed in honor of Oscar V. Peterson, a Medal of Honor recipient who died after the attack on USS Neosho during the Battle of the Coral Sea in World War II.

== Development ==
Like the rest of her sister ships, the John Lewis class is intended to replace the older Henry J. Kaiser-class oilers and is heavily based on the former's design. As replenishment oilers, the vessels transport fuel and cargo to other ships at sea to extend their range and capabilities.

== Namesakes and renaming ==
In July 2016, Ray Mabus, then United States Secretary of the Navy, advised Congress that he intended to name the John Lewis-class oilers after prominent civil rights leaders, with this ship to be named in honor of gay rights activist and U.S. Navy veteran Harvey Milk. Milk served in the U.S. Navy during the Korean War aboard USS Kittiwake, a submarine rescue ship, and held the rank of lieutenant (junior grade). In 1955, he was forced to resign and accept an "other than honorable" discharge, rather than face a court-martial for his homosexuality.

In early June 2025, an internal defense department memo was leaked that directed the Navy to rename Harvey Milk. According to the leaked materials, the reason for renaming the civilian crewed oiler was to "reestablish the warrior culture" of the U.S. military. Military.com reported that an unnamed defense official indicated that the announcement was intentionally timed to take place during LGBTQ Pride Month.

The new name, Oscar V. Peterson, was announced at the end of June 2025. Peterson was a U.S. Navy Chief Petty Officer and Medal of Honor recipient who died after the attack on USS Neosho during the Battle of the Coral Sea in World War II. All the other ships in the class are named after civil rights leaders.

== Construction ==
Construction for both Harvey Milk, and John Lewis, the lead ship of the class, was authorized on 30 June 2016. Building got underway for John Lewis in 2018 at General Dynamics NASSCO in San Diego.

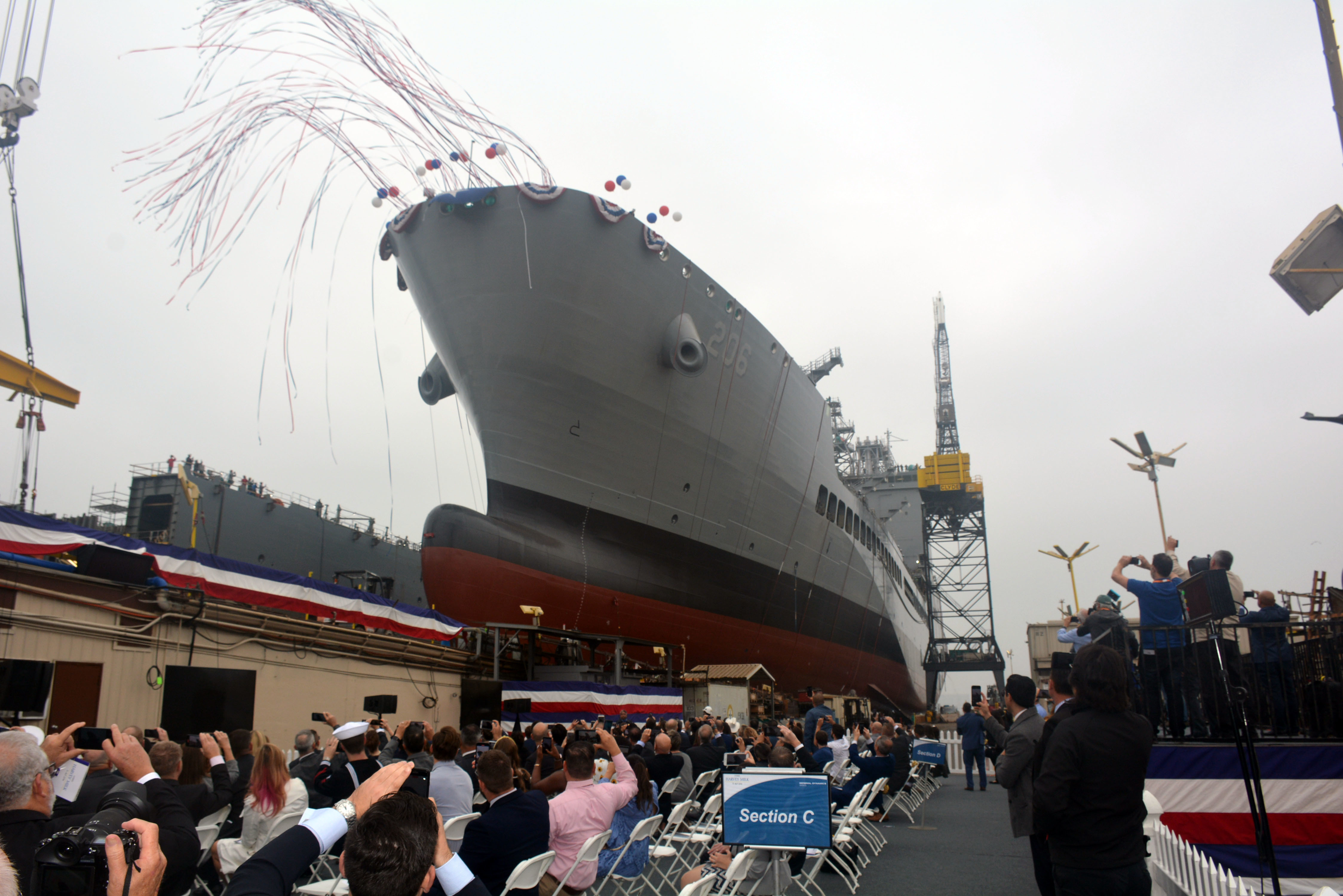
Harvey Milk at her christening and launch ceremony, November 2021

The first cut of steel for Harvey Milk occurred on 13 December 2019, marking the beginning of construction of the vessel. The ship had her christening ceremony and was then launched on 6 November 2021, with Milk's nephew Stuart Milk, Navy Secretary Carlos Del Toro, and the ship's sponsor, prominent LBGTQ activist Paula Neira, in attendance.

On 11 July 2023, she entered non-commissioned U.S. Navy service under the control of the Military Sealift Command.

== Career ==
In March 2024, during the Gaza war, nine pro-Palestinian protesters attempted to board the ship and create a disturbance. They were stopped at the gangway before they could board; however, they managed to chain themselves to the gangway until San Francisco Police removed them. The protest was organized by, amongst others, the Arab Resource and Organizing Center, which falsely claimed that the oiler was carrying weapons to Israel. After the ship left San Francisco it transited the Panama Canal on 10 April 2024 and arrived at Norfolk on 16 April 2024 to conduct sea trials. The ship then operated off the US east coast from Norfolk and refueled Japanese training ships in September and USS Gerald R. Ford in December.

Harvey Milk was scheduled for a $24 million post-shakedown availability shipyard period at Alabama Shipyard in Mobile from January to June 2025.
