= USNS Robert F. Kennedy =

John Lewis-class replenishment oiler

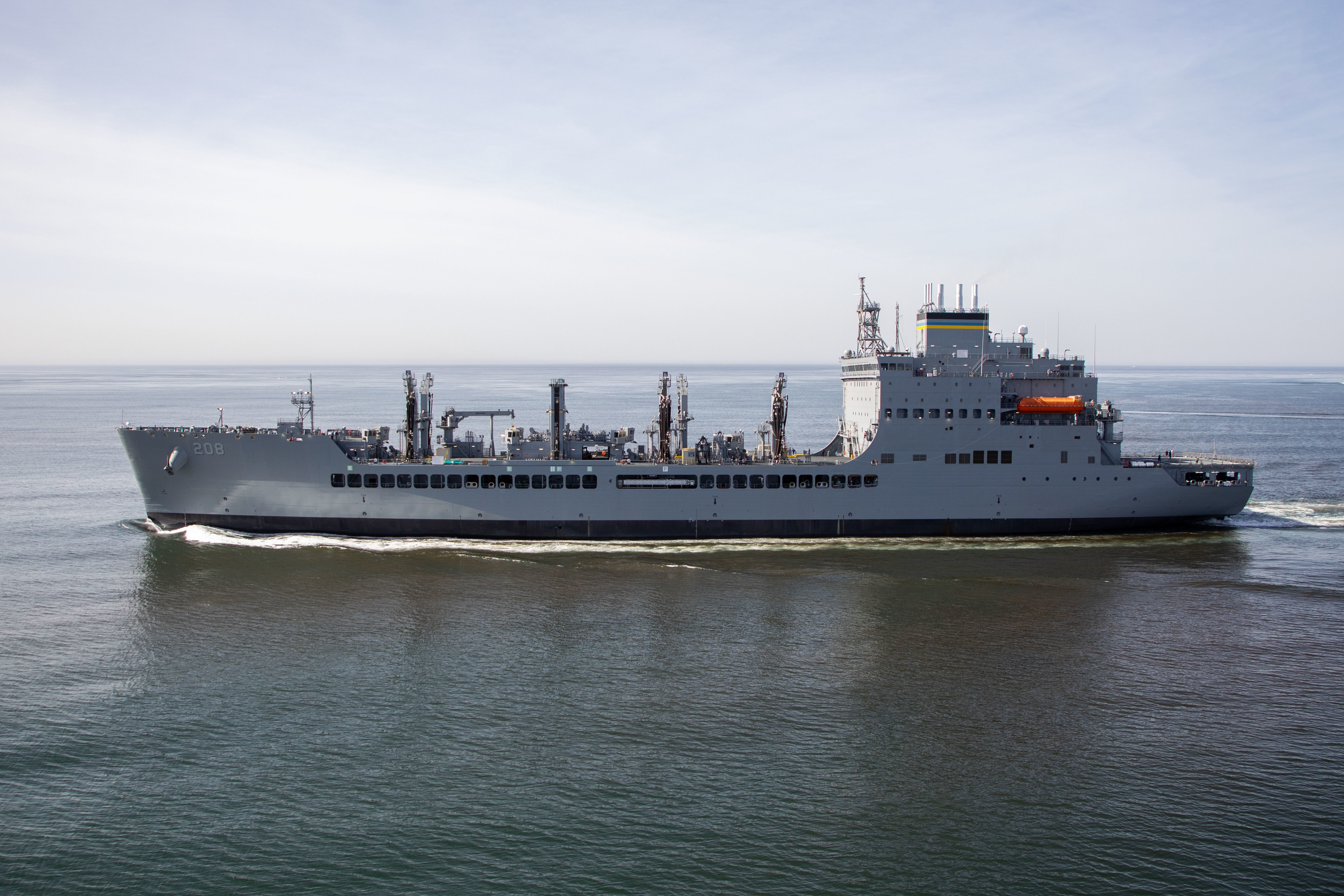
- Robert F. Kennedy following her delivery to the US Navy in 2024

History

United States
- Name: Robert F. Kennedy
- Namesake: Robert Kennedy
- Awarded: 2015
- Builder: National Steel and Shipbuilding Company, San Diego, California
- Laid down: 5 December 2022
- Launched: 28 October 2023
- Christened: 28 October 2023
- Acquired: 10 December 2024
- Identification: Hull number: T-AO-208
- Motto: Fueling Peace
- Status: In active service
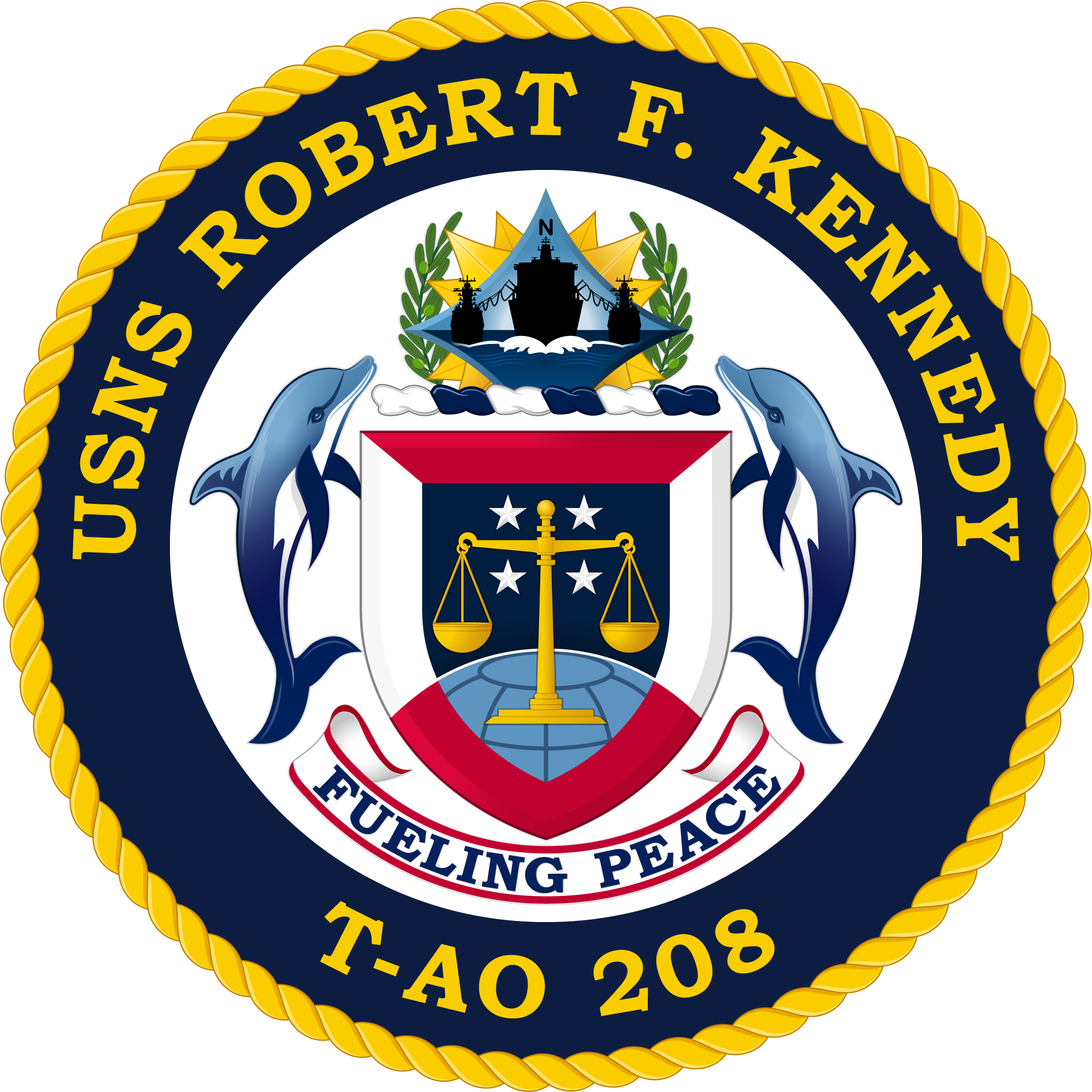
- Badge

General characteristics
- Class & type: John Lewis-class replenishment oiler
- Displacement: 22,515 t (22,159 long tons) (Light ship)
- Length: 746 ft (227 m)
- Beam: 106 ft (32 m)
- Draft: 33.5 ft (10.2 m)
- Speed: 20 knots (37 km/h; 23 mph)
- Complement: 99 civilian mariners (CIVMARS)

USNS Robert F. Kennedy (T-AO-208) is a John Lewis-class replenishment oiler operated by the Military Sealift Command to logistically support the United States Navy. She was launched in 2023 and is named after former attorney-general Robert F. Kennedy.

== History ==
Like the rest of her sister ships, the John Lewis class is intended to replace the older Henry J. Kaiser-class oilers and is heavily based on the former's design. As replenishment oilers, the vessels transport fuel and cargo to other ships at sea to extend their range and capabilities.

Initially known as T-AO-208, she was ordered in 2015 from NASSCO along with the first six ships of the class at an estimated cost of $800 million per ship. The next year, she was named after former attorney-general Robert F. Kennedy for his efforts to combat inequality in the United States. Her keel was laid on 5 December 2022 and launched and christened on 28 October 2023, at the shipyard in San Diego. She entered service following her delivery to the Navy on 10 December 2024.
