= Oscar V. Peterson =

United States Navy Medal of Honor recipient

Oscar Verner Peterson
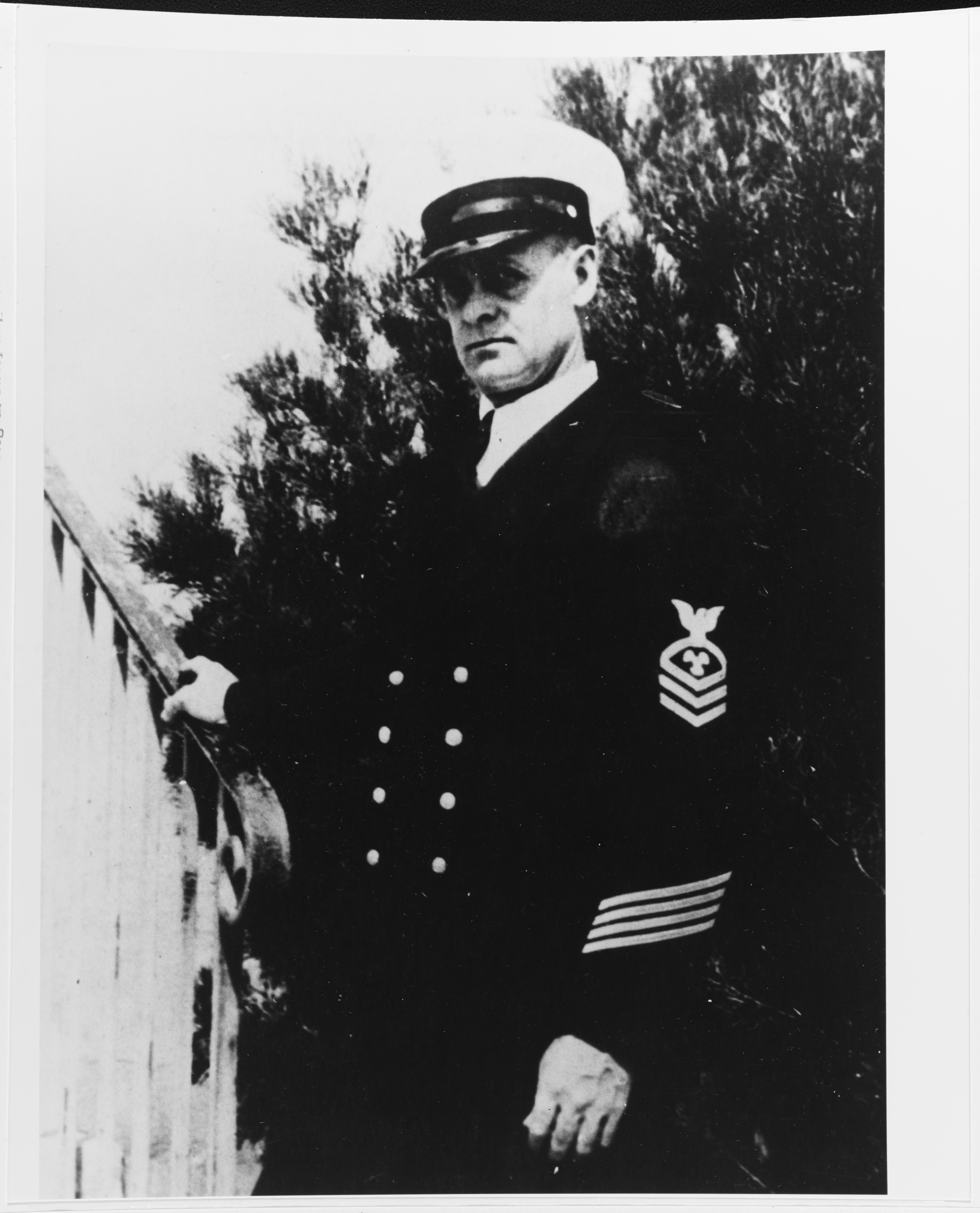
- Chief Watertender Oscar V. Peterson, USN
- Born: August 27, 1899; Prentice, Wisconsin
- Died: May 13, 1942 (aged 42); USS Henley, Coral Sea
- Burial place: Buried at sea
- Military career
- Allegiance: United States of America
- Branch: United States Navy
- Service years: 1920–1942
- Rank: Chief Watertender
- Unit: USS Neosho (AO-23)
- Conflicts: World War II; Battle of the Coral Sea (DOW)
- Awards: Medal of Honor

Oscar Verner Peterson (August 27, 1899 – May 13, 1942) was a Chief Petty Officer in the United States Navy who received the Medal of Honor posthumously in World War II for his actions during the Battle of the Coral Sea.

== Early life and career ==
Peterson was born in Prentice, Wisconsin, and enlisted in the United States Navy on December 8, 1920. After his initial training, he spent his entire Navy career of over twenty years on sea duty aboard various ships.

By the United States' entry into World War II, Peterson had achieved the rank of chief watertender. He was assigned to USS Neosho, a replenishment oiler operating in the Pacific theater.

== Battle of the Coral Sea ==
On May 7, 1942, during the Battle of the Coral Sea, Neosho was heavily damaged by Japanese dive bomber aircraft. In one bombing raid, Peterson and members of the repair party he led were severely wounded. Despite his injuries, he managed to close four bulkhead steam line valves, but suffered third-degree burns to his face, shoulders, arms and hands in the process. By shutting the valves, Peterson isolated the steam to the engine room and helped keep the ship operational.

Neosho was eventually scuttled on May 11 by gunfire from the destroyer USS Henley. Henley had taken aboard 123 survivors from Neosho. Peterson died of his burn injuries on May 13 and was buried at sea, several hundred miles off the coast of Australia.

For his actions during the battle, Peterson was posthumously awarded the Medal of Honor later that year, on December 7. For unknown reasons, his family did not receive his medal in a formal presentation ceremony as was typical. Instead, the medal and accompanying certificate were mailed to his widow.

Peterson's official Medal of Honor citation reads:

For extraordinary courage and conspicuous heroism above and beyond the call of duty while in charge of a repair party during an attack on the U.S.S. Neosho by enemy Japanese aerial forces on 7 May 1942. Lacking assistance because of injuries to the other members of his repair party and severely wounded himself, Peterson, with no concern for his own life, closed the bulkhead stop valves and in so doing received additional burns which resulted in his death. His spirit of self-sacrifice and loyalty, characteristic of a fine seaman, was in keeping with the highest traditions of the U.S. Naval Service. He gallantly gave his life in the service of his country.

== Awards ==

1st row	Medal of Honor		Purple Heart
2nd row	Combat Action Ribbon Retroactively Awarded, 1999	Navy Good Conduct Medal with 4 Service stars	American Defense Service Medal with "Fleet" Clasp
3rd row	American Campaign Medal	Asiatic-Pacific Campaign Medal with 2 Campaign stars	World War II Victory Medal

== Legacy ==
After Peterson's death, his widow and children moved from California to Richfield, Idaho. His wife Lola died in 1991, and his son Donald in 2008. On April 3, 2010, sixty-eight years after the Battle of the Coral Sea, a Medal of Honor presentation ceremony was held to amend for the one Peterson's wife never received. Rear Admiral James A. Symonds presented the medal and a forty-eight star U.S. flag to Peterson's surviving son, Fred. The ceremony, held at the Richfield meetinghouse of the Church of Jesus Christ of Latter-day Saints, was attended by roughly 850 people, including family members, veterans, and officials from the military and Idaho state government. A military-issued memorial marker for Peterson was placed in Richfield Cemetery the same day.

U.S. Navy destroyer escort USS Peterson, commissioned 1943, was named in his honor. The ship was decommissioned in 1965. On June 27, 2025, U.S. Secretary of Defense Pete Hegseth announced that USNS Harvey Milk, a John Lewis-class replenishment oiler launched in 2021, would be renamed USNS Oscar V. Peterson, in honor of Peterson.
