= USNS Earl Warren =

John Lewis-class oiler of the United States Navy

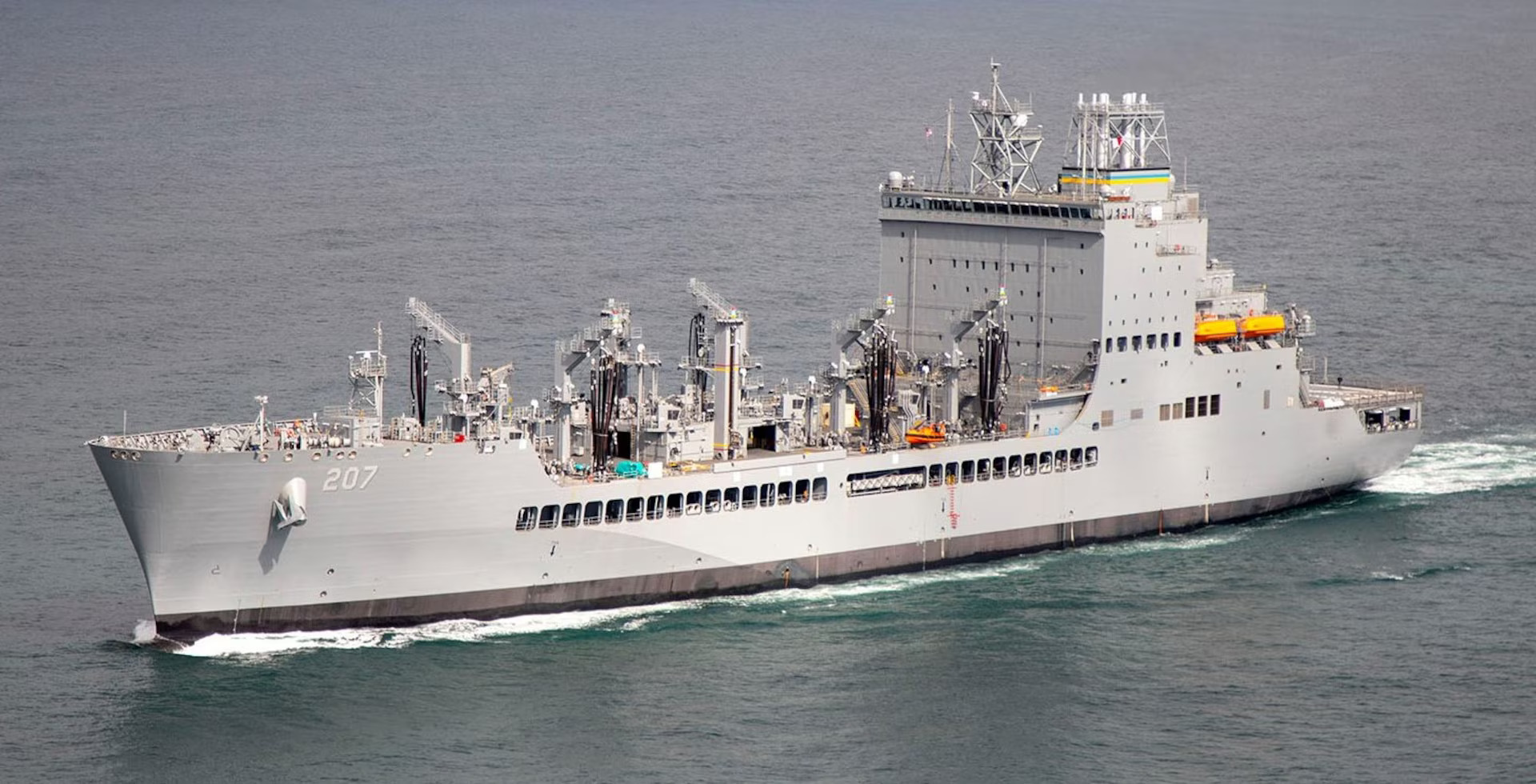
- Earl Warren after being delivered to the US Navy

History

United States
- Name: Earl Warren
- Namesake: Earl Warren
- Awarded: 30 June 2016
- Builder: National Steel and Shipbuilding Company, San Diego, California
- Laid down: 30 April 2022
- Launched: 28 October 2022
- Sponsored by: Elena Kagan
- Christened: 21 January 2023
- Identification: Hull number: T-AO-207
- Motto: Aut Viam Inventam Aut Faciam (I Will Find a Way or I Will Make One)
- Status: In active service
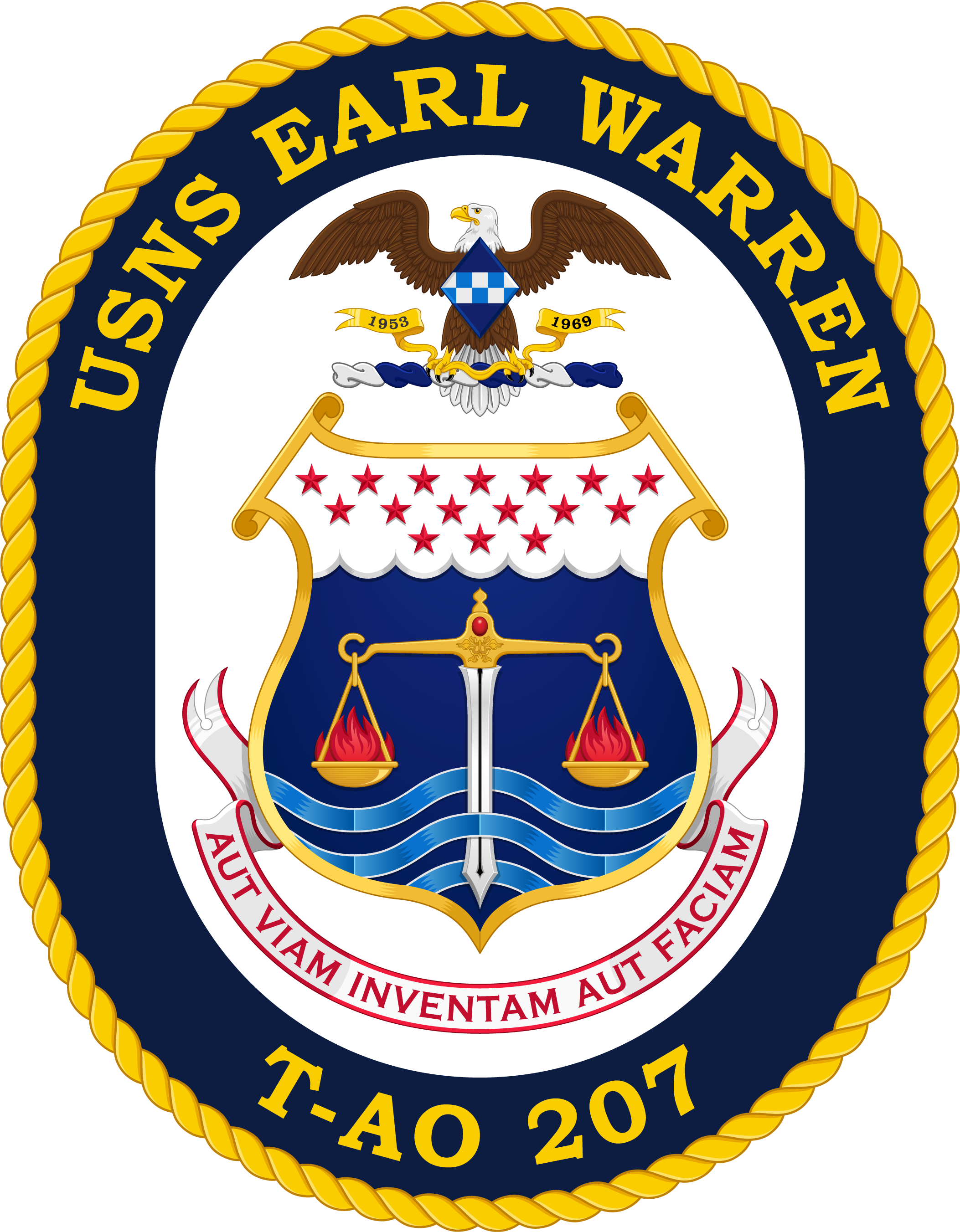
- Badge

General characteristics
- Class & type: John Lewis-class replenishment oiler
- Displacement: 22,515 t (22,159 long tons)
- Length: 746 ft (227 m)
- Beam: 106 ft (32 m)
- Draft: 33.5 ft (10.2 m)
- Speed: 20 knots (37 km/h; 23 mph)
- Complement: 99 civilian mariners (CIVMARS)

USNS Earl Warren (T-AO-207) is the third of the John Lewis class of underway replenishment oilers, operated by the Military Sealift Command (MSC) to support ships of the United States Navy.

== Namesake ==
Earl Warren served in the United States Army during the World War I and held the rank of first lieutenant. After the war, he joined the Army Reserve until 1934, during which time he had been promoted to captain. He also served as governor of his home state California from 1943 to 1953 and as the 14th Chief Justice of the United States from 1953 to 1969. The ship was officially named during a ceremony at the District of Columbia City Hall in Washington, D.C., on 14 December 2016.

== Construction ==
Construction of the ship was authorized on 30 June 2016. In July 2016, Ray Mabus, then United States Secretary of the Navy, advised Congress that he intended to name the ship in honor Earl Warren, the 14th Chief Justice of the United States. The ship had her keel laid during a ceremony on 30 April 2022. In attendance at the ceremony was sponsor Elena Kagan, an Associate Justice of the Supreme Court of the United States. Kagan's initials were etched into a ceremonial keel plate.

On 28 October 2022, Earl Warren was launched at the National Steel and Shipbuilding Company shipyard in San Diego and christened by Elena Kagan on 21 January 2023.

== See also ==
- Henry J. Kaiser class - predecessor class
