= USNS Harriet Tubman =

John Lewis-class oiler

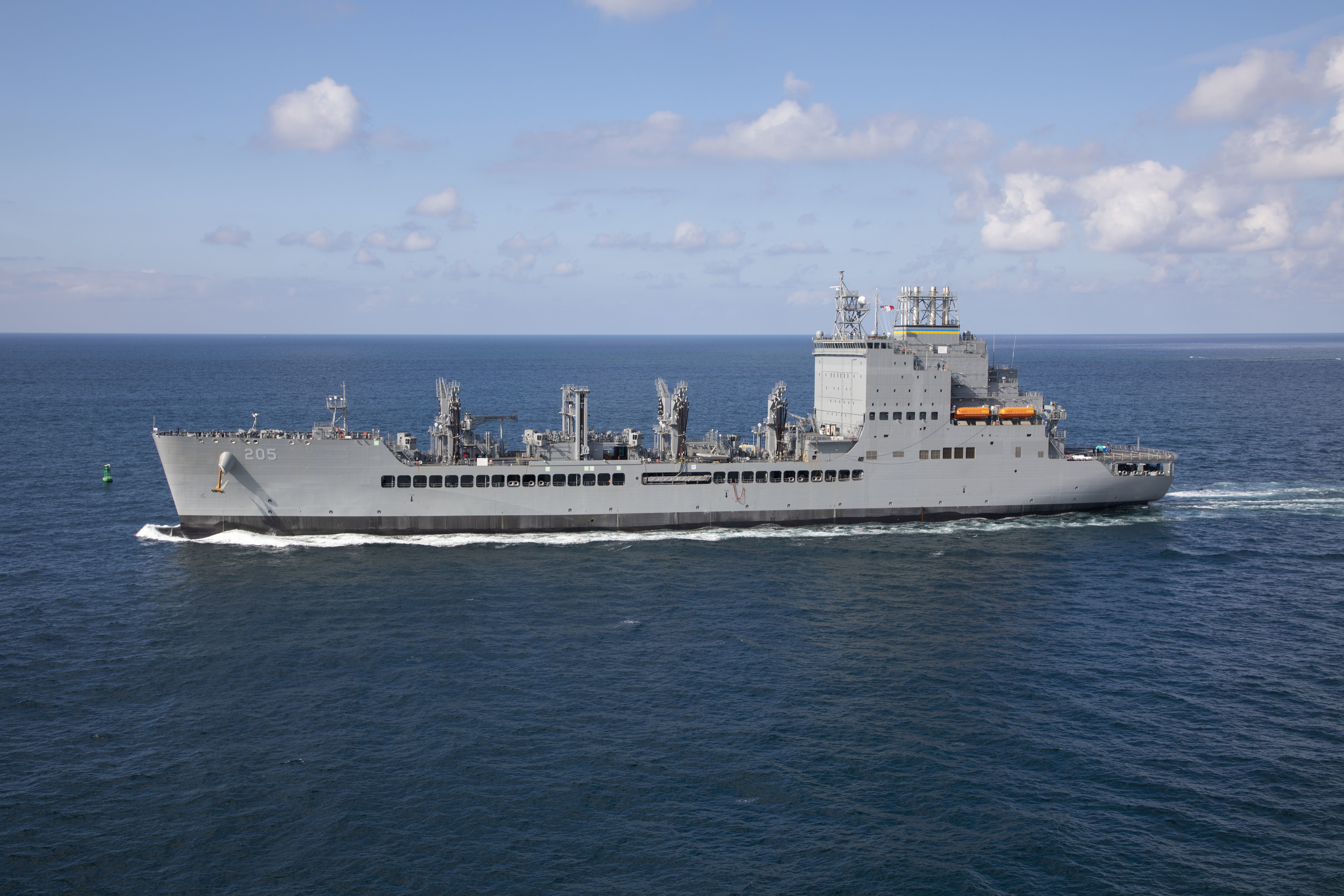
- Lead of the class John Lewis in 2022. Harriet Tubman would look nearly identical.

History

United States
- Name: Harriet Tubman
- Namesake: Harriet Tubman
- Awarded: 2022
- Builder: National Steel and Shipbuilding Company, San Diego, California
- Laid down: June 2026
- Identification: Hull number: T-AO-213
- Status: Under construction

General characteristics
- Class & type: John Lewis-class replenishment oiler
- Displacement: 22,515 t (22,159 long tons)
- Length: 746 ft (227 m)
- Beam: 106 ft (32 m)
- Draft: 33.5 ft (10.2 m)
- Speed: 20 knots (37 km/h; 23 mph)
- Complement: 99 civilian mariners

USNS Harriet Tubman (T-AO-213) will be a John Lewis-class replenishment oiler planned to be operated by the Military Sealift Command to logistically support the United States Navy. She was laid down in 2026 and is named after antislavery activist Harriet Tubman.

== History ==
Like the rest of her sister ships, the John Lewis class is intended to replace the older Henry J. Kaiser-class replenishment oilers and is heavily based on the former's design. As replenishment oilers, the vessels are operated by Military Sealift Command to transport fuel and cargo to warships at sea to extend their range and capabilities.

Initially designated only by the hull number T-AO-213, the vessel was ordered in 2022 from the National Steel and Shipbuilding Company (NASSCO) alongside Thurgood Marshall (T-AO-211) and Ruth Bader Ginsburg (T-AO-212). The three vessels formed the second batch of oilers ordered from the shipyard. The ship was named after abolitionist and activist Harriet Tubman on 17 September 2023, which was the anniversary of her successful escape from slavery in 1849.

Her keel was laid down in June 2026; in the same month, a brief fire occurred onboard which required more than 80 firefighters to extinguish. No one was injured, and the shipyard stated that the damage was "minimal" and primarily affected workout equipment.
