= John Lewis-class replenishment oiler =

Class of ship

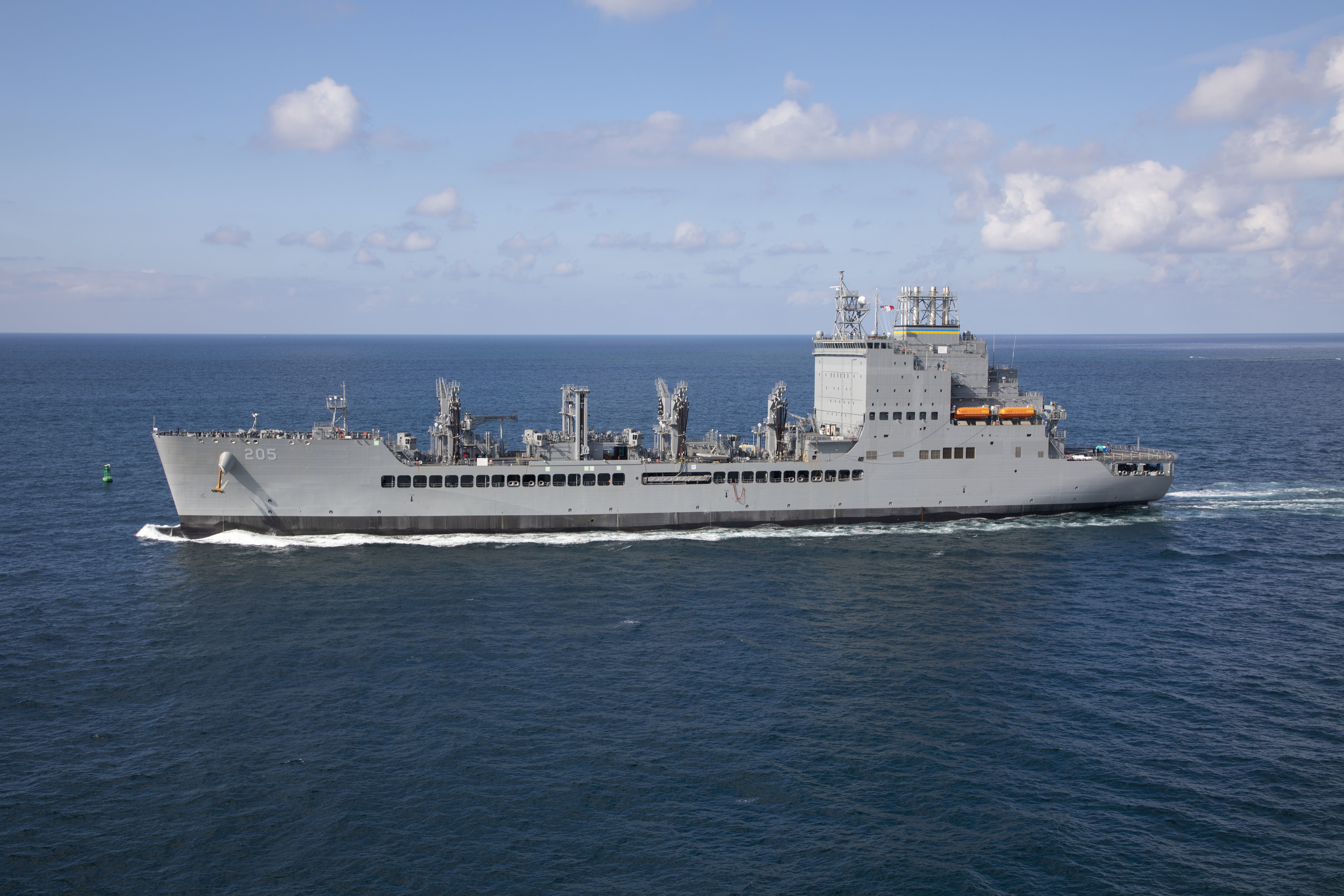
- USNS John Lewis (T-AO-205) in 2022

Class overview
- Name: John Lewis class
- Builders: General Dynamics National Steel and Shipbuilding Company (NASSCO)
- Preceded by: Henry J. Kaiser class
- Built: 2019-present
- In service: 2022-present
- Planned: 20
- On order: 6
- Building: 5
- Completed: 6
- Active: 6

General characteristics
- Type: Fleet replenishment oiler
- Displacement: 49,850 tons full load
- Length: 746 ft (227.4 m)
- Beam: 106 ft 5 in (32.4 m)
- Draft: 33.5 ft (10.2 m) maximum
- Propulsion: Two medium-speed Fairbanks-Morse 12V48/60CR diesel engines, two shafts, propellers
- Speed: 20 knots (37 km/h; 23 mph)
- Endurance: 6,147 nmi (11,384 km; 7,074 mi)
- Complement: 125 total
- Electronic warfare & decoys: AN/SLQ-25A Nixie torpedo countermeasures
- Armament: Multiple .50-caliber machine guns; Space, weight, and power reservations for Phalanx close-in weapons systems or SeaRAM
- Aviation facilities: Helicopter flight deck
- Notes: 5 refueling stations; 2 dry cargo transfer rigs

The John Lewis class is a class of fleet replenishment oilers which began construction in September 2018. The class, named for its lead ship, which was named for the civil rights movement leader and congressman John Lewis, will comprise twenty oilers ships which will be operated by Military Sealift Command to provide underway replenishment of fuel and limited amounts of dry cargo to United States Navy carrier strike groups, amphibious ready groups, and other surface forces, to allow them to operate worldwide.

== Design ==
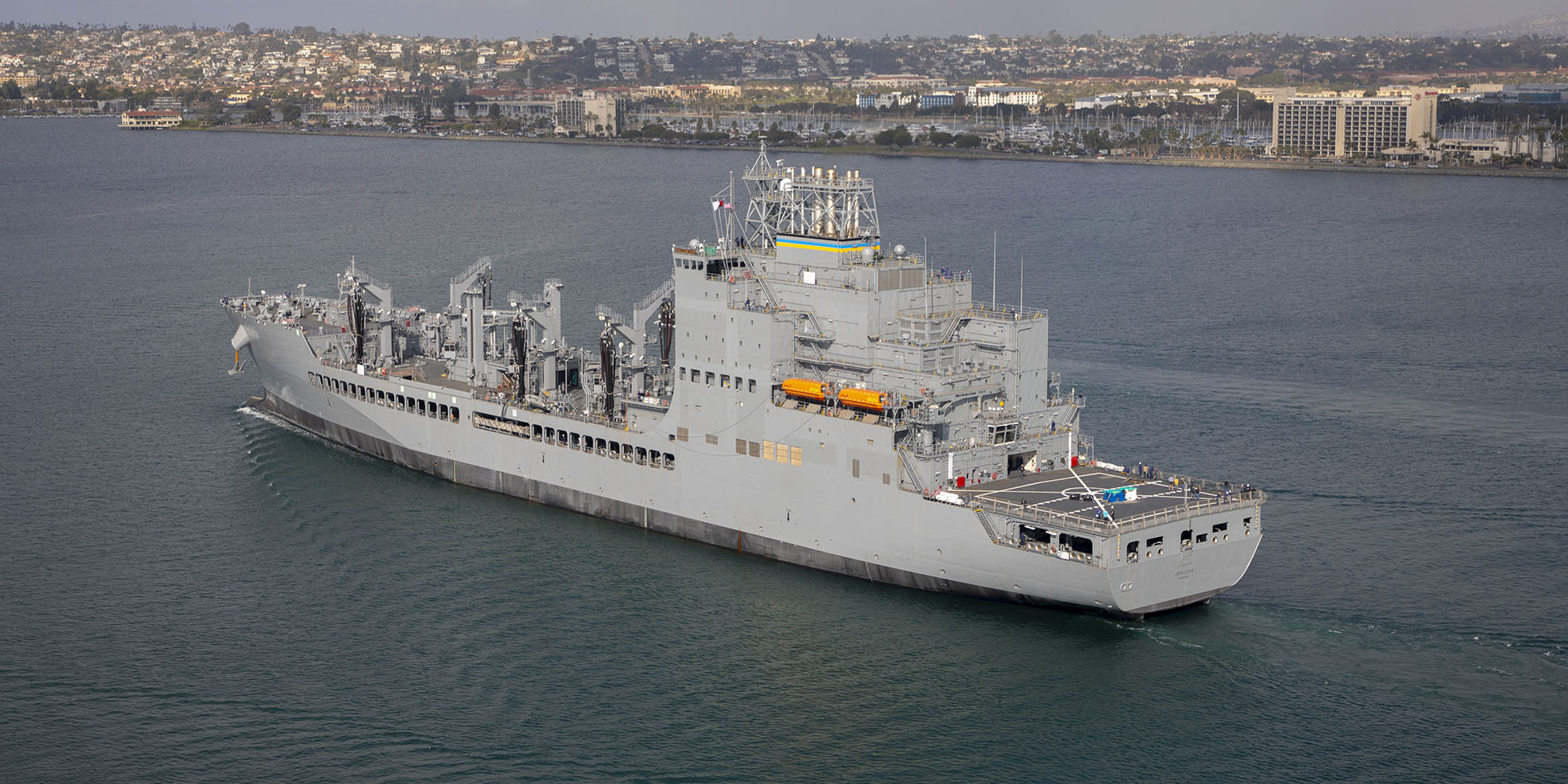
View from behind of USNS John Lewis in 2022

The John Lewis-class ships are double-hulled and constructed to commercial standards and OPNAVINST 9070.1 requirements. They are classed to American Bureau of Shipping steel vessel rules. The ships have capabilities similar to the Henry J. Kaiser-class replenishment oilers and rely on existing technology. The ships can carry 156,000 barrels of oil and have increased dry cargo storage over the Henry J. Kaiser class.

There are stations on both sides of each ship for underway replenishment of fuel and stores, and will have two dry cargo transfer rigs. The John Lewis-class ships have self-defenses against mines and torpedoes, and are equipped with crew-served weapons which are operated by embarked Navy Expeditionary Security Teams for limited self-defense ability against small boat attack.

The ships have space, weight, and power reserved for additional self-defense systems, including close-in weapon systems (CIWS) or SeaRAM, and an anti-torpedo torpedo defense system. Even with additional self-defense systems installed the ships will still require escort if operating in a higher threat environment.

== History ==
In June 2016, General Dynamics National Steel and Shipbuilding Company (NASSCO) was awarded a design and construction contract for six John Lewis-class replenishment oilers. NASSCO began construction on John Lewis in September 2018, and began construction on Harvey Milk in September 2020. In January 2020 the lead ship delivery estimate was delayed from November 2020 until June 2021, due to delays in delivery of gear and flooding of a graving dock. In September of 2024, General Dynamics was awarded a contract for eight additional John Lewis-class ships, to be delivered by January of 2035.

== Naming ==
The class is named for its lead ship, John Lewis, which is named for American civil rights movement leader and politician John Lewis. The remaining John Lewis-class oilers will be named after prominent civil rights leaders and activists. In 2025, the former Harvey Milk was renamed after Medal of Honor recipient Oscar V. Peterson. According to Secretary of Defense Pete Hegseth, the action was to help the Navy align with the priorities of President Trump and to, "reestablish the warrior culture." The Navy clarified that no other ships in the class would be renamed.

== Ships ==
Ship	Hull. No.	Namesake	Laid down	Launched	Status	Refs
John Lewis	T-AO-205	John Lewis - Civil rights movement leader and Congressman	13 May 2019	12 January 2021	Active, in service 27 July 2022	
Oscar V. Peterson (ex-Harvey Milk)	T-AO-206	Oscar V. Peterson - Medal of Honor recipient (ex Harvey Milk - City Supervisor, Medal of Freedom recipient)	3 September 2020	6 November 2021	Active, in service 11 July 2023, renamed in June 2025 from Harvey Milk to Oscar V. Peterson	
Earl Warren	T-AO-207	Earl Warren - Supreme Court Chief Justice	30 April 2022	28 October 2022	Active, in service 7 May 2024	
Robert F. Kennedy	T-AO-208	Robert F. Kennedy - Attorney General	5 December 2022	29 October 2023	Active, in service 10 December 2024	
Lucy Stone	T-AO-209	Lucy Stone - Woman's rights advocate	8 August 2023	21 September 2024	Active, in service 16 December 2025	
Sojourner Truth	T-AO-210	Sojourner Truth - Woman's rights advocate	21 June 2024	26 April 2025	Active, in service 9 June 2026	
Thurgood Marshall	T-AO-211	Thurgood Marshall - Supreme Court Justice	5 December 2024	18 April 2026	Under construction	
Ruth Bader Ginsburg	T-AO-212	Ruth Bader Ginsburg - Supreme Court Justice	13 February 2026		Under construction	
Harriet Tubman	T-AO-213	Harriet Tubman - Civil War-era abolitionist	18 June 2026		Under construction	
Dolores Huerta	T-AO-214	Dolores Huerta - American labor leader and civil rights activist			Under construction	
Joshua L. Goldberg	T-AO-215	Joshua L. Goldberg - First rabbi to volunteer for naval service			Under construction	
Thomas D. Parham	T-AO-216	Thomas D. Parham - first African American sailor promoted to Captain			On order	
T-AO-217 through T-AO-221					On order	
