= USNS Sojourner Truth =

John Lewis-class oiler

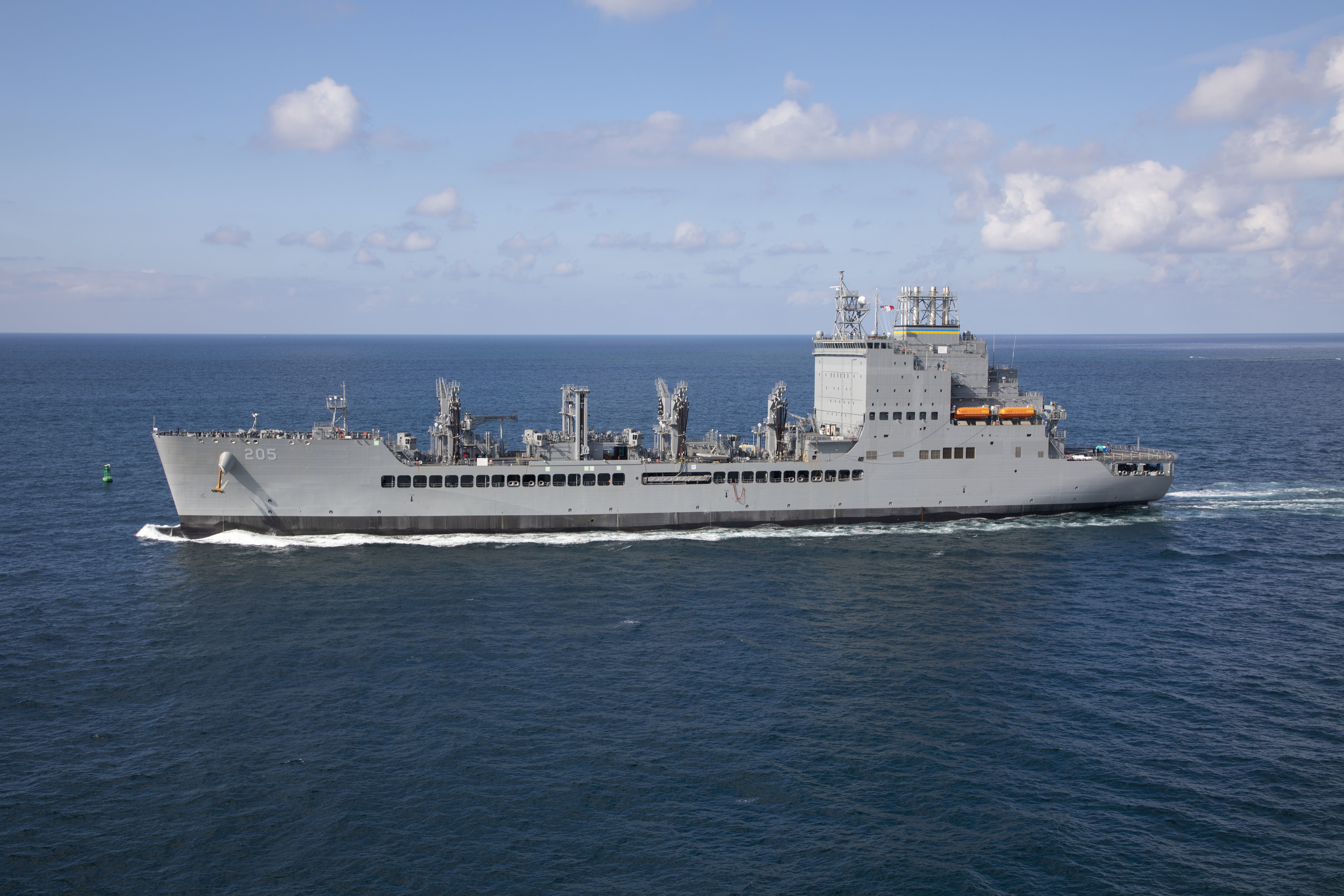
- Lead of the class John Lewis in 2022. Sojourner Truth would look nearly identical

History

United States
- Name: Sojourner Truth
- Namesake: Sojourner Truth
- Awarded: 2015
- Builder: National Steel and Shipbuilding Company, San Diego, California
- Laid down: 21 June 2024
- Launched: 22 April 2025
- Christened: 22 April 2025
- Commissioned: 9 June 2026
- Identification: Hull number: T-AO-210
- Status: In service

General characteristics
- Class & type: John Lewis-class replenishment oiler
- Displacement: 22,515 t (22,159 long tons) (Light ship)
- Length: 746 ft (227 m)
- Beam: 106 ft (32 m)
- Draft: 33.5 ft (10.2 m)
- Speed: 20 knots (37 km/h; 23 mph)
- Complement: 99 civilian mariners (CIVMARS)

USNS Sojourner Truth (T-AO-210) is a John Lewis-class replenishment oiler planned to be operated by the Military Sealift Command to logistically support the United States Navy. She was launched in 2025 and is named after activist Sojourner Truth.

== History ==
Like the rest of her sister ships, the John Lewis class is intended to replace the older Henry J. Kaiser-class replenishment oilers and is heavily based on the former's design. As replenishment oilers, the vessels transport fuel and cargo to other ships at sea to extend their range and capabilities.

Initially known as T-AO-210, she was ordered in 2015 from NASSCO along with the first six ships of the class at an estimated cost of $800 million apiece. The next year, she was named after 19th-century abolitionist and suffragist Sojourner Truth, which followed a theme of naming the oilers after activists. Her keel was laid on 21 June 2024 at the company's San Diego shipyard, and she was both christened and launched on 22 April 2025.
