= USNS Thurgood Marshall =

John Lewis-class oiler

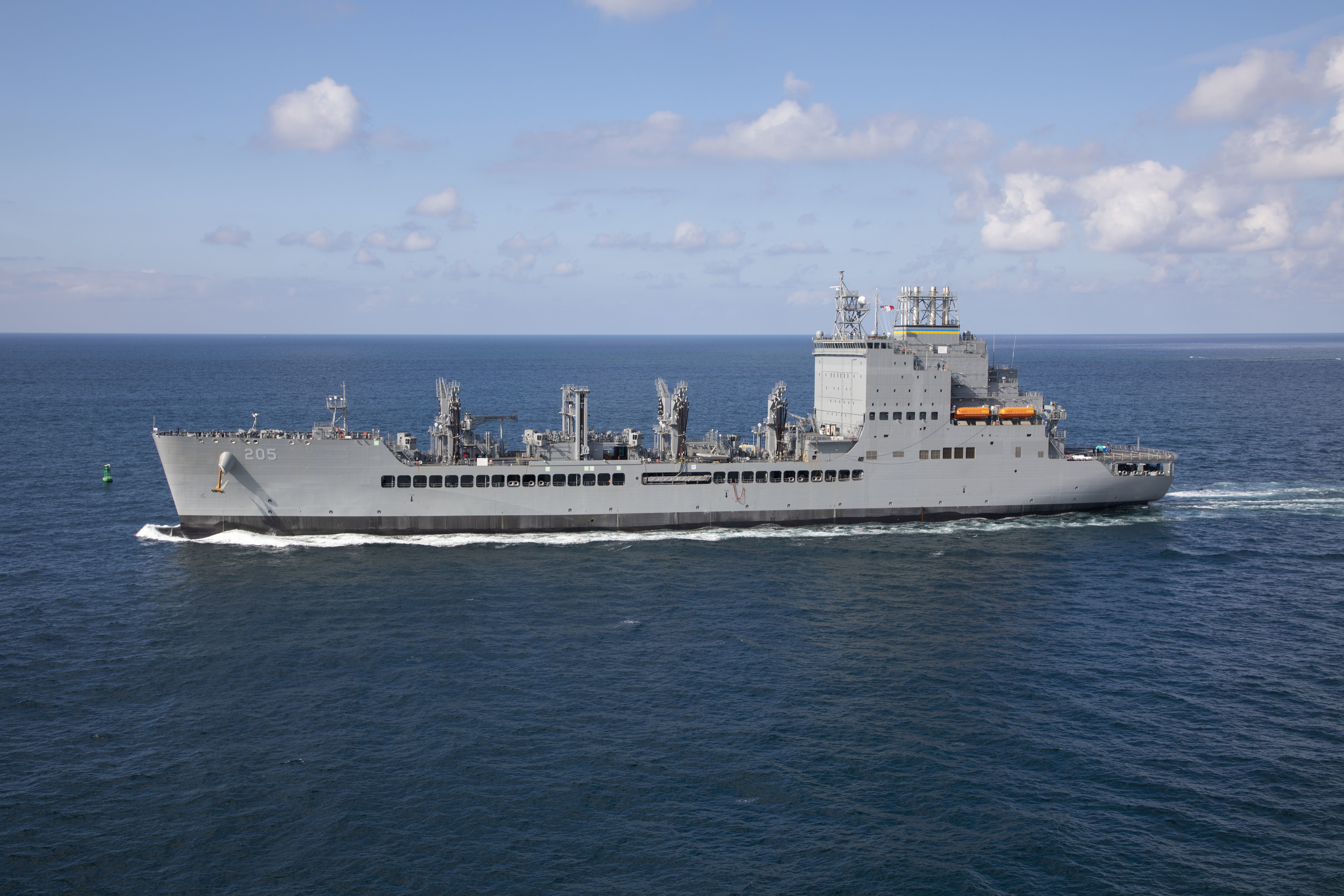
- Lead of the class John Lewis in 2022. Thurgood Marshall would look nearly identical

History

United States
- Name: Thurgood Marshall
- Namesake: Thurgood Marshall
- Awarded: 2022
- Builder: National Steel and Shipbuilding Company, San Diego, California
- Laid down: 5 December 2024
- Identification: Hull number: T-AO-211
- Motto: Fueling Freedom
- Status: Under construction
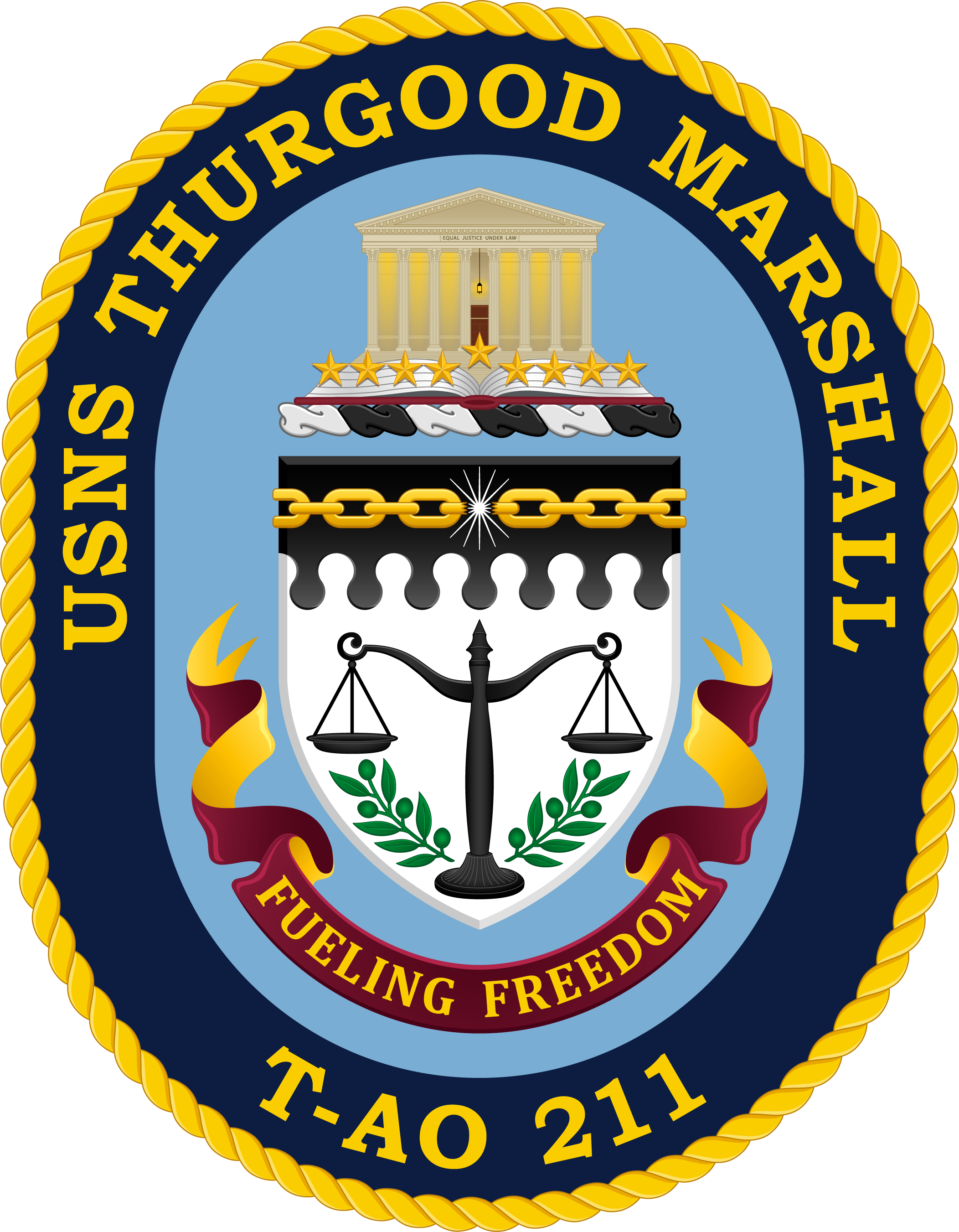
- Badge

General characteristics
- Class & type: John Lewis-class replenishment oiler
- Displacement: 22,515 t (22,159 long tons) (Light ship)
- Length: 746 ft (227 m)
- Beam: 106 ft (32 m)
- Draft: 33.5 ft (10.2 m)
- Speed: 20 knots (37 km/h; 23 mph)
- Complement: 99 civilian mariners (CIVMARS)

USNS Thurgood Marshall (T-AO-211) will be a John Lewis-class replenishment oiler planned to be operated by the Military Sealift Command to logistically support the United States Navy. She was laid down in 2024 and is named after Supreme Court Justice Thurgood Marshall.

== History ==
Like the rest of her sister ships, the John Lewis class is intended to replace the older Henry J. Kaiser-class replenishment oilers and is heavily based on the former's design. As replenishment oilers, the vessels are operated by Military Sealift Command to transport fuel and cargo to warships at sea to extend their range and capabilities.

Initially designated only by the hull number T-AO-211, the vessel was ordered in 2022 from the National Steel and Shipbuilding Company (NASSCO) alongside Ruth Bader Ginsburg (T-AO-212) and Harriet Tubman (T-AO-213). The three vessels formed the second batch of oilers ordered from the shipyard. The ship was named in 2022 after Supreme Court justice Thurgood Marshall, which followed a theme of naming the oilers after activists. Her keel was laid down on 5 December 2024 at NASSCO's shipyard in San Diego, California.
