= USNS Ruth Bader Ginsburg =

John Lewis-class oiler

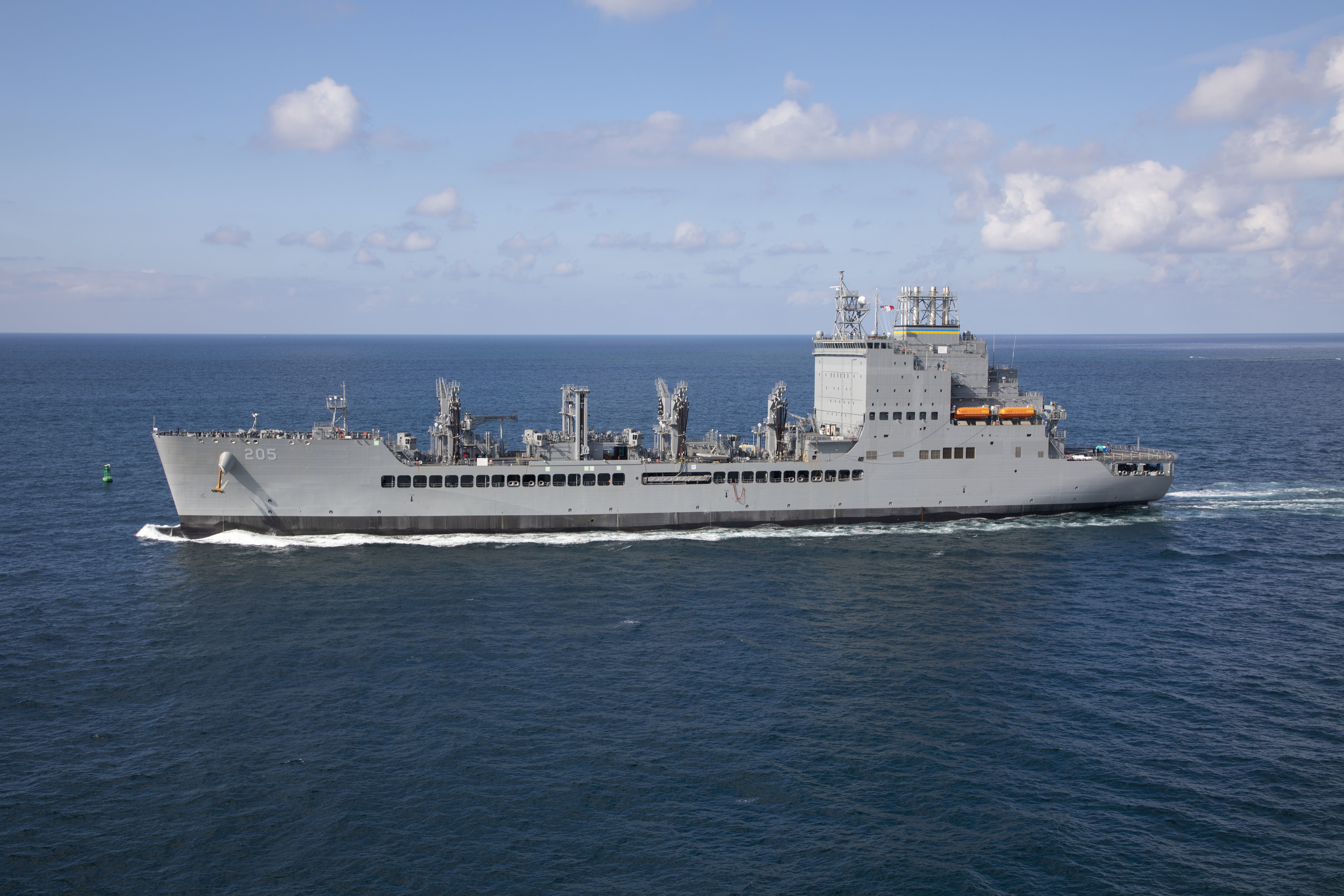
- Lead of the class John Lewis in 2022. Ruth Bader Ginsburg would look nearly identical.

History

United States
- Name: Ruth Bader Ginsburg
- Namesake: Ruth Bader Ginsburg
- Ordered: 30 June 2022
- Awarded: 30 June 2022
- Builder: National Steel and Shipbuilding Company, San Diego, California
- Laid down: 13 February 2026
- Launched: 27 October 2026
- Sponsored by: Jane Ginsburg
- Identification: Hull number: T-AO-212
- Status: Launched

General characteristics
- Class & type: John Lewis-class replenishment oiler
- Displacement: 22,515 t (22,159 long tons)
- Length: 746 ft (227 m)
- Beam: 106 ft (32 m)
- Draft: 33.5 ft (10.2 m)
- Speed: 20 knots (37 km/h; 23 mph)
- Complement: 99 civilian mariners

USNS Ruth Bader Ginsburg (T-AO-212) is a John Lewis-class replenishment oiler planned to be operated by the Military Sealift Command to logistically support the United States Navy. She was laid down on 13 February 2026 and launched on 27 October 2026. She is named after Supreme Court Justice Ruth Bader Ginsburg and was sponsored by her daughter Jane Ginsburg.

== History ==
Like the rest of her sister ships, the John Lewis class is intended to replace the older Henry J. Kaiser-class replenishment oilers and is heavily based on the former's design. As replenishment oilers, the vessels are operated by Military Sealift Command to transport fuel and cargo to warships at sea to extend their range and capabilities.

Initially designated only by the hull number T-AO-212, the vessel was ordered in 2022 from the National Steel and Shipbuilding Company (NASSCO) alongside Thurgood Marshall (T-AO-211) and Harriet Tubman (T-AO-213). The three vessels formed the second batch of oilers ordered from the shipyard. The ship was named in 2022 after Supreme Court justice Ruth Bader Ginsburg, which followed a theme of naming the oilers after activists. Her keel was laid down on 13 February 2026 at NASSCO's shipyard in San Diego, California. She was launched on 27 October 2026 and is set to be christened in 2027.
