= USNS John Lewis =

Oiler of the United States Navy

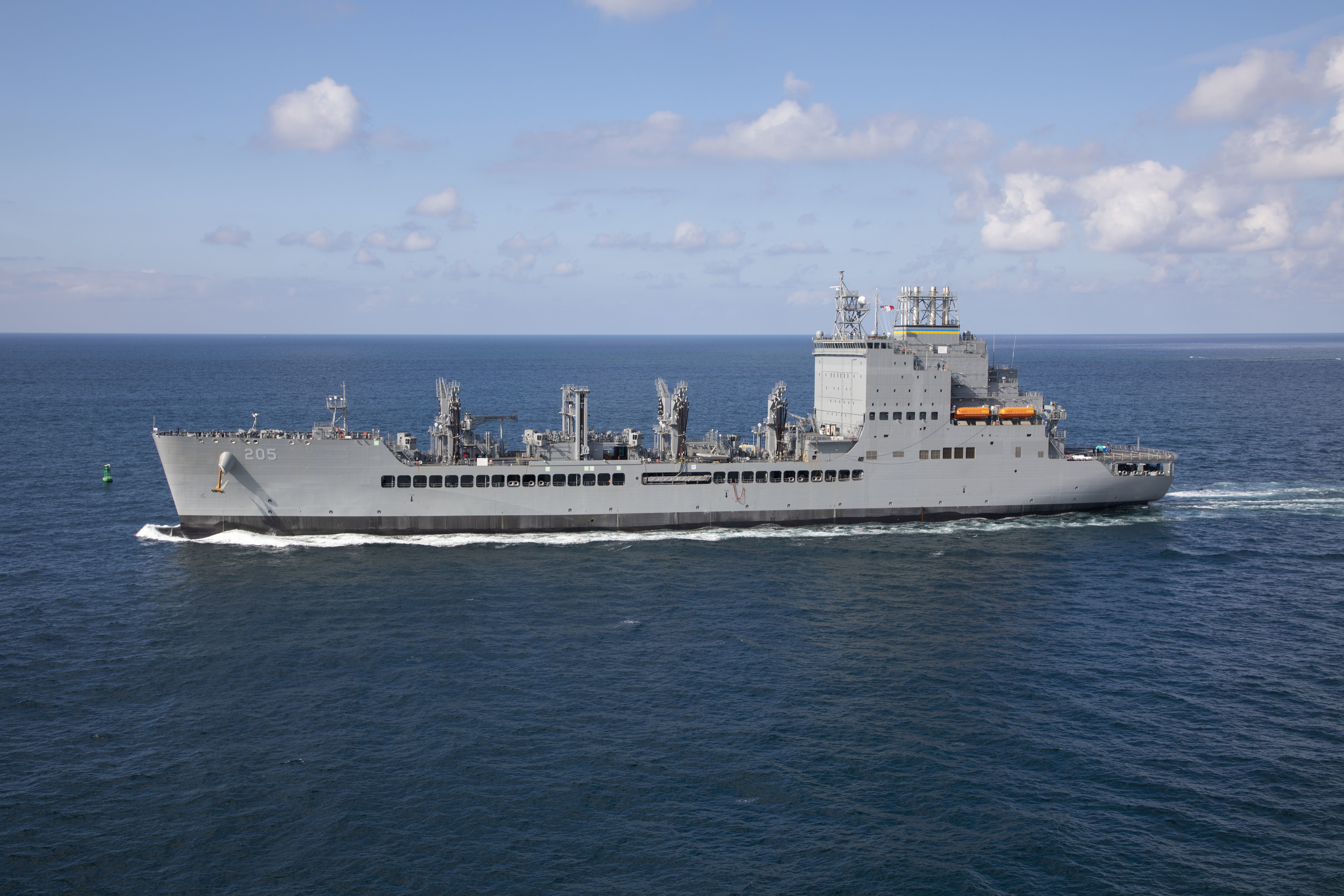
- USNS John Lewis (T-AO-205) in 2022.

History

United States
- Name: John Lewis
- Namesake: John Lewis
- Awarded: 30 June 2016
- Builder: National Steel and Shipbuilding Company, San Diego, California
- Cost: $640,206,756
- Laid down: 13 May 2019
- Launched: 12 January 2021
- Sponsored by: Alfre Woodard
- Christened: 17 July 2021
- In service: 27 July 2022
- Identification: Hull number: T-AO-205; IMO number: 9812626; MMSI number: 368926485; Callsign: NJLS
- Motto: Unbreakable Perseverance
- Status: In active Military Sealift Command service
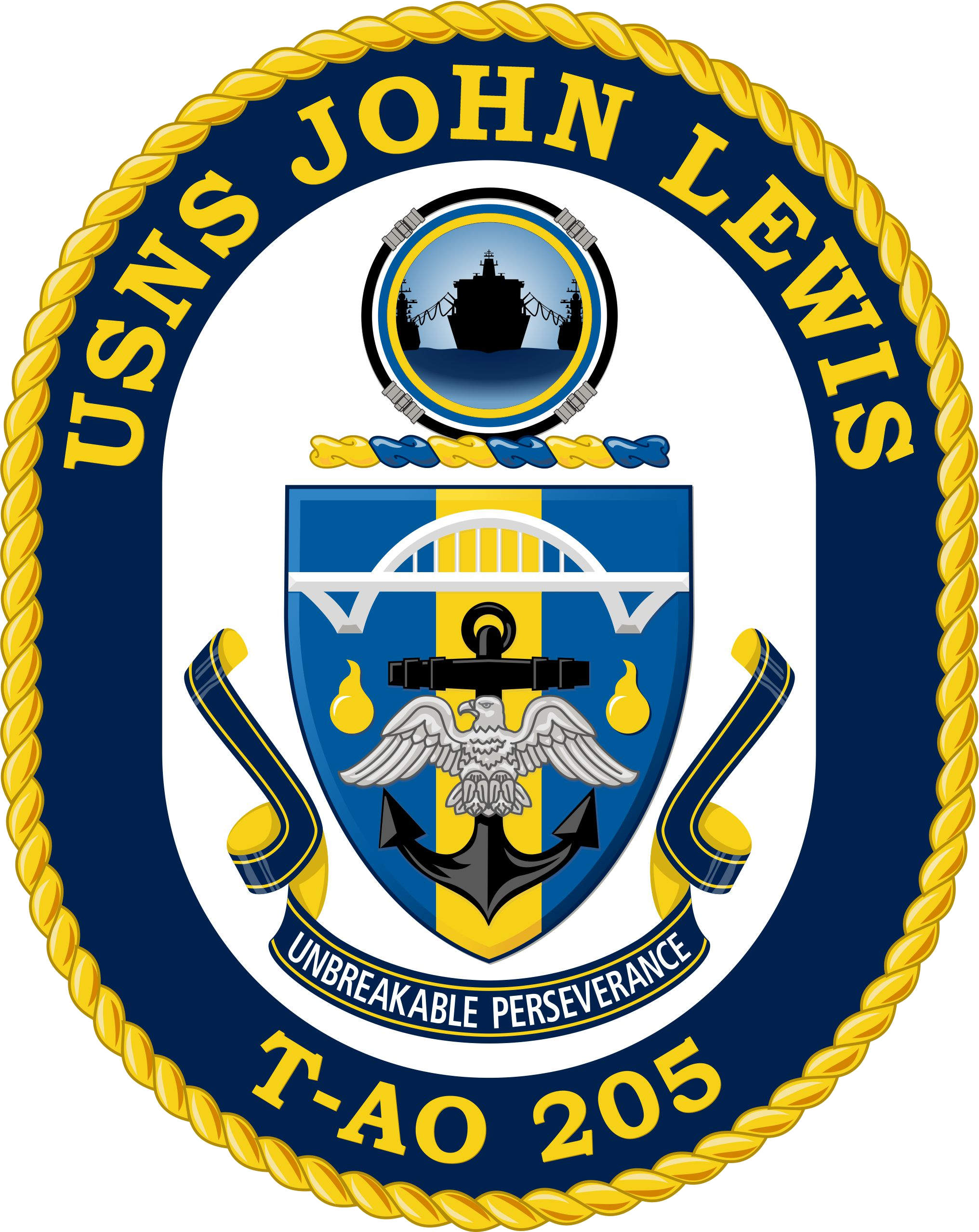
- Badge

General characteristics
- Class & type: John Lewis-class replenishment oiler
- Displacement: 22,515 t (22,159 long tons) (Light ship)
- Length: 746 ft (227 m)
- Beam: 106 ft (32 m)
- Draft: 33.5 ft (10.2 m)
- Speed: 20 knots (37 km/h; 23 mph)
- Complement: 99 civilian mariners (CIVMARS)

USNS John Lewis (T-AO-205) is a United States Navy replenishment oiler and the lead ship of her class. She is part of the Military Sealift Command fleet of support ships.

Ray Mabus, then Secretary of the Navy, announced on 6 January 2016 that the ship would be named in honor of John Lewis. a 1960s Civil Rights Movement leader and at the time a sitting United States representative (1987 until his death in 2020).

== Construction ==
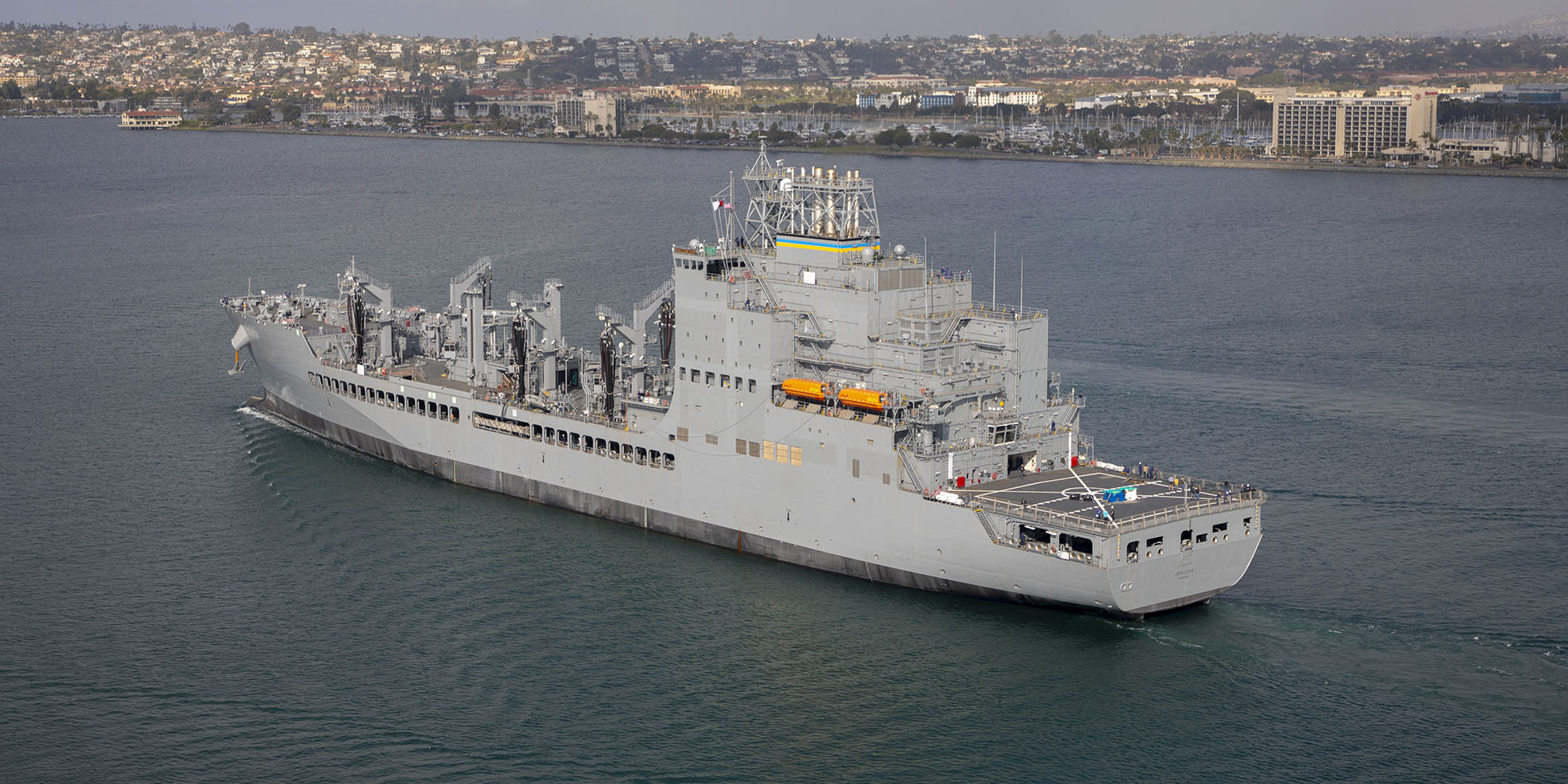
John Lewis underway near San Diego, California during builder's trials, February 2022.

Construction was authorized for the first six ships in the class on 30 June 2016. National Steel and Shipbuilding Company began construction of John Lewis on 20 September 2018, with completion scheduled for November 2020.

The John Lewis class will be equipped with a basic self-defense capability, including crew-served weapons, degaussing, and AN/SLQ-25 Nixie torpedo decoys, and has space, weight, and power reserves for close-in weapon systems (CIWS) such as SeaRAMs.

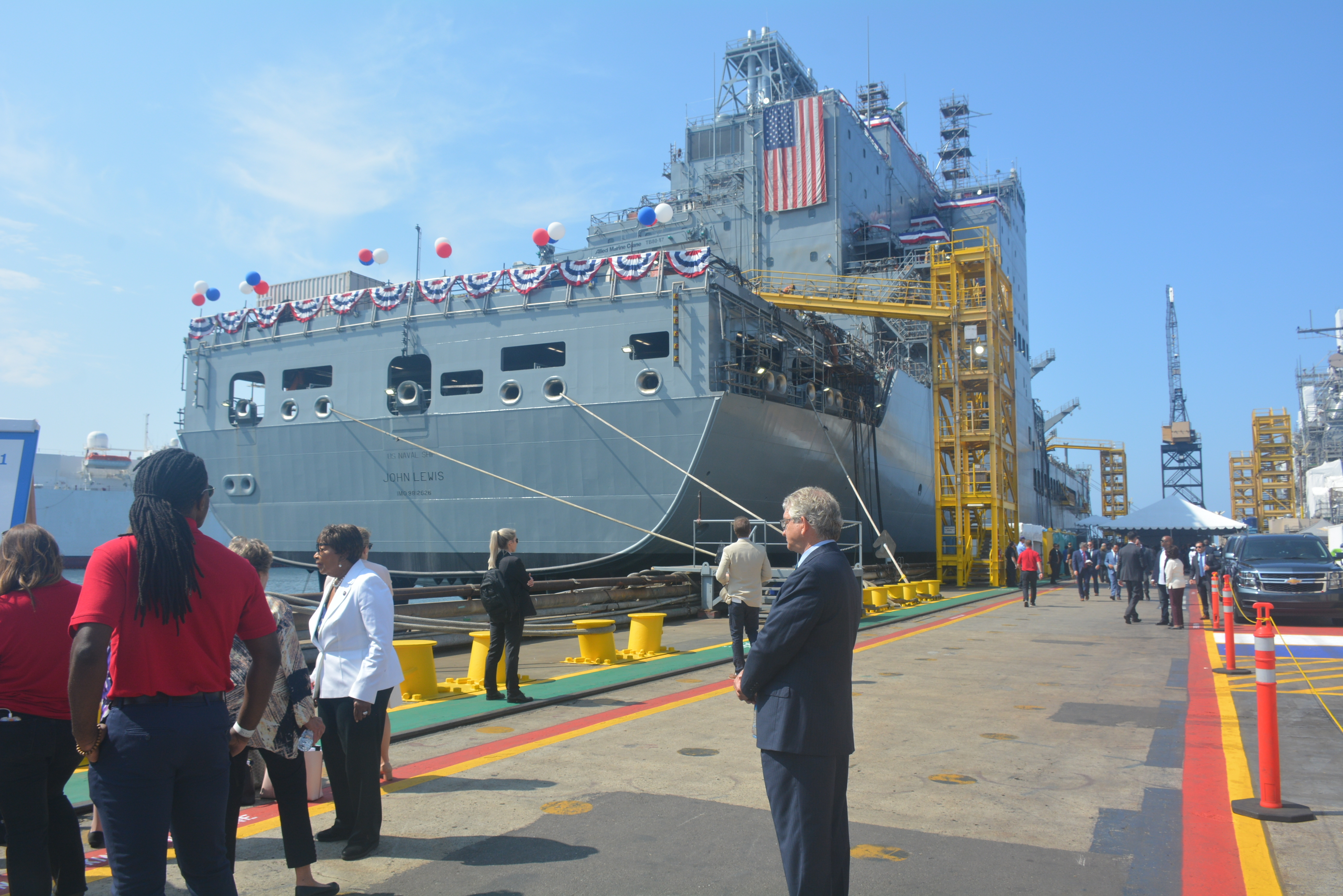
John Lewis during her christening ceremony, July 2021

She was christened on 17 July 2021, the first anniversary of Lewis's death. After completing sea trials with the Navy's Board of Inspection and Survey, John Lewis entered non-commissioned U.S. Navy service under the control of the Military Sealift Command on 27 July 2022.

== Career ==
On 12 December 2022 while traversing from Pearl Harbor to San Diego, John Lewis received a distress call approximately 400 km (250 mi) south of San Diego and 160 km (99 mi) west of the coast of Mexico. A 7.3 m (24 ft) sailboat had suffered damage with torn sails and had been drifting for five days. Once the sailor was located, he was checked by the medical crew, then fed and clothed. The sailor was then transported to San Diego, where he did not require hospitalization.

== See also ==
- Henry J. Kaiser class - predecessor class

== Bibliography ==
- DANFS (13 January 2016). "John Lewis (T-AO-205)". Dictionary of American Naval Fighting Ships. history.navy.mil.
