= USS Neosho (AO-23) =

Oiler of the United States Navy

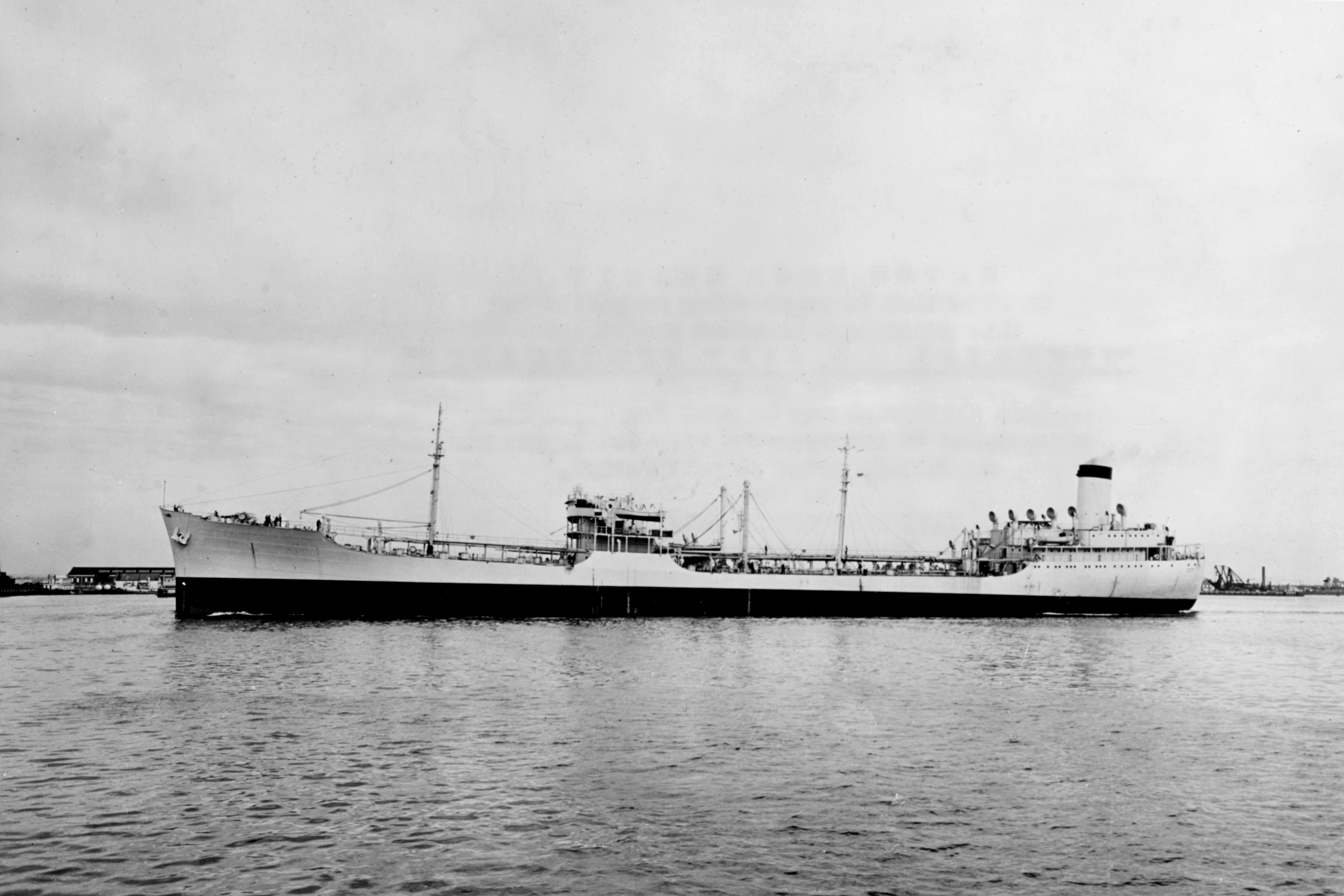
- USS Neosho (AO-23)

History

United States
- Name: Neosho
- Namesake: The Neosho River in Kansas and Oklahoma
- Builder: Federal Shipbuilding and Drydock Company, Kearny, New Jersey
- Laid down: 22 June 1938
- Launched: 29 April 1939
- Sponsored by: Mrs. Emory S. Land
- Commissioned: 7 August 1939
- Fate: Scuttled 11 May 1942

General characteristics
- Class & type: Cimarron-class fleet oiler
- Displacement: 7,470 long tons (7,590 t) (standard); 24,830 long tons (25,228 t) (full load)
- Length: 553 ft (169 m)
- Beam: 75 ft (23 m)
- Draft: 32 ft 4 in (9.86 m)
- Installed power: 30,400 shp (22,700 kW)
- Propulsion: 2 × geared steam turbines; 2 × shafts
- Speed: 20 knots (37 km/h; 23 mph)
- Complement: 304
- Armament: 4 × single 5 in (127 mm) DP Guns; 4 × single 20 mm (0.8 in) Oerlikon anti-aircraft cannons

Service record
- Operations: World War II
- Awards: 2 battle stars

USS Neosho (AO-23) was a Cimarron-class fleet oiler serving with the United States Navy, the second ship to be named for the Neosho River in Kansas and Oklahoma.

After surviving the attack on Pearl Harbor, Neosho operated in the South Pacific. During the Battle of the Coral Sea she was attacked and set alight, but managed to keep afloat until rendezvousing with an American destroyer on 11 May 1942. The destroyer rescued the crew and sank the vessel.

== Construction and commissioning ==
Neosho was laid down under United States Maritime Commission contract by Federal Shipbuilding and Drydock Company, Kearny, New Jersey, 22 June 1938; launched on 29 April 1939; sponsored by Mrs. Emory S. Land, wife of Rear Admiral Emory S. Land (Ret.), Chairman of the Maritime Commission; and commissioned on 7 August 1939.

Conversion at Puget Sound Naval Shipyard was completed on 7 July 1941, Neosho immediately began the vital task of ferrying aviation fuel from west coast ports to Pearl Harbor. On such a mission she arrived in Pearl Harbor on 6 December, discharged a full cargo to Naval Air Station Ford Island, and prepared for the return passage.

== Service history ==
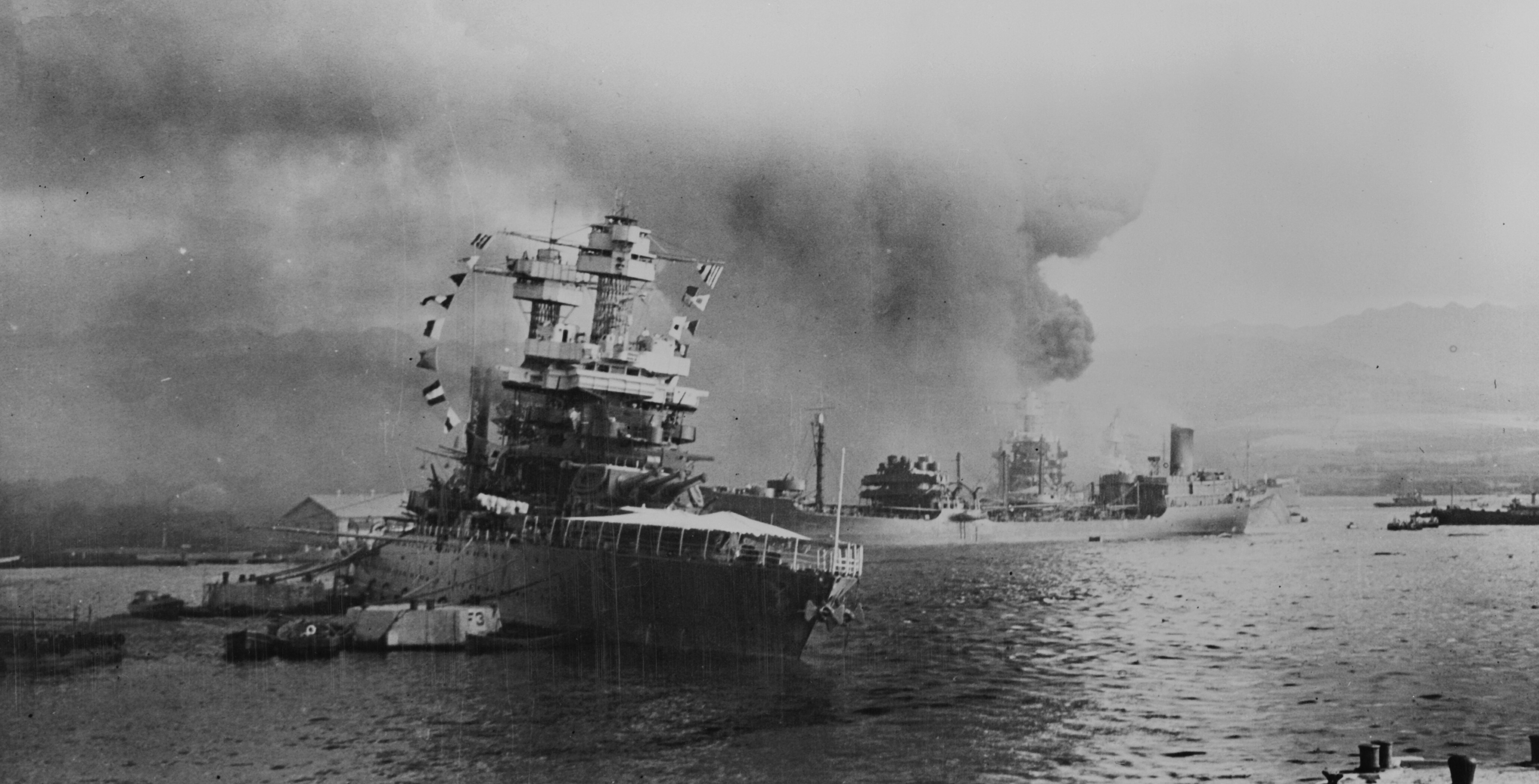
Neosho (right) leaving her berth to escape the Japanese attack, 7 December 1941

Next morning, the surprise attack on Pearl Harbor found Neosho alert to danger; her captain—Commander John S. Phillips—got her underway and maneuvered safely through the Japanese fire, concentrated on the battleships moored at Ford Island, to a safer area of the harbor. Her guns fired throughout the attack, shooting down one enemy plane and driving off others. Three of her men were wounded by a strafing attacker.

For the next five months, Neosho sailed with the aircraft carriers or independently, since escort ships—now few and far between—could not always be spared to guard even so precious a ship and cargo. Late in April, as the Japanese threatened a southward move against Australia and New Zealand by attempting to advance their bases in the Southwest Pacific, Neosho joined Task Force 17 (TF 17). At all costs, the sea lanes to the dominions had to be kept open, and they had to be protected against attack and possible invasion.

As the American and Japanese fleets sought each other in the opening maneuvers of the climactic Battle of the Coral Sea on 6 May 1942, Neosho refueled the carrier Yorktown and the heavy cruiser Astoria, then retired from the carrier force with a lone escort, the destroyer Sims.

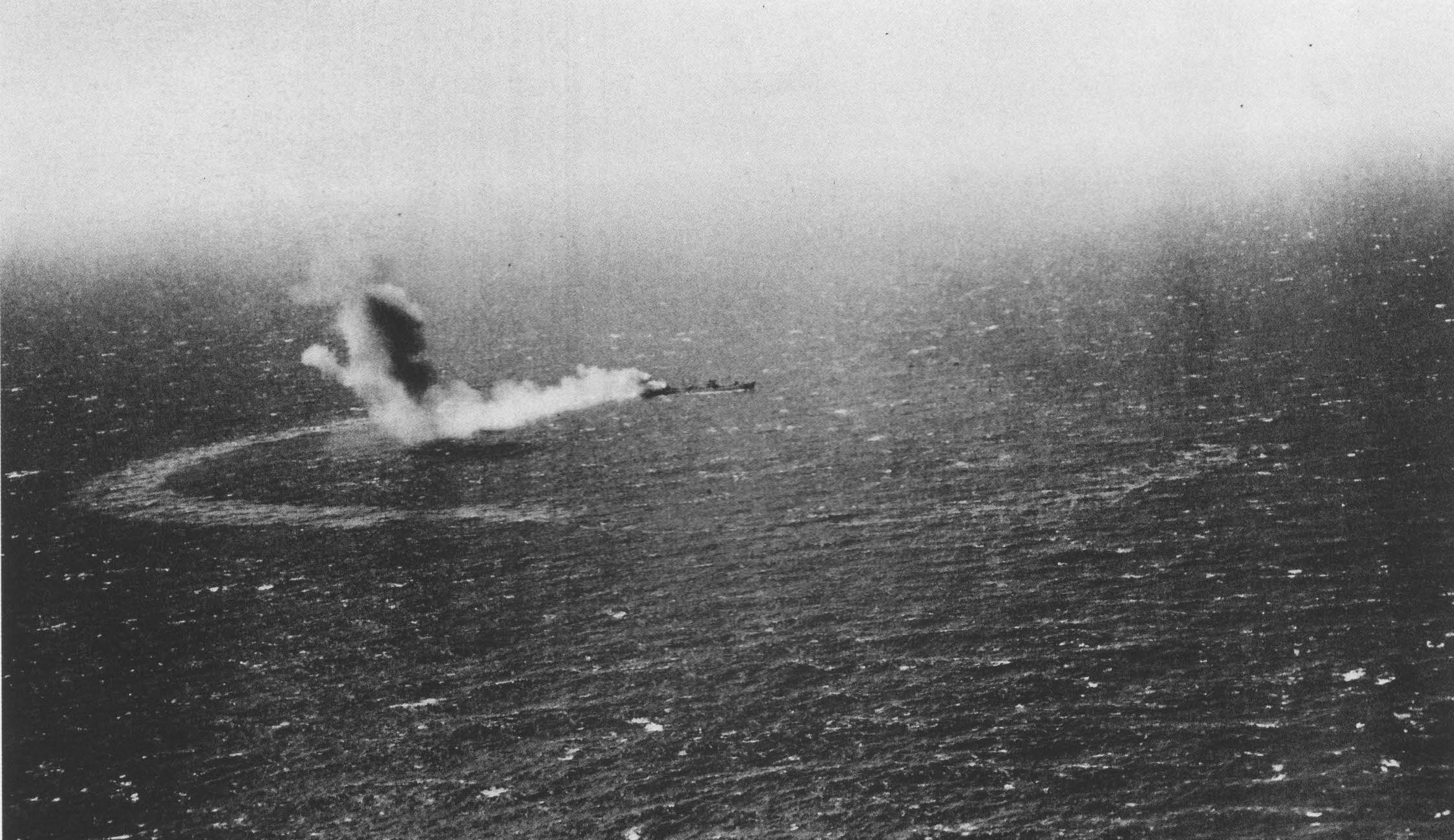
Neosho burning, 7 May 1942.

The next day at 1000, Japanese search planes spotted the two ships and misidentified them as a carrier and her escort. 78 aircraft from Shōkaku and Zuikaku soon arrived and began searching in vain for the "carrier" force. Eventually, they gave up and returned to sink Sims and leave Neosho—victim of seven direct hits and a suicide dive by one of the bombers—ablaze aft and in danger of breaking in two. One of her crewmen, Oscar V. Peterson, was posthumously awarded the Medal of Honor for his efforts to save the ship in spite of his severe injuries suffered in the attack.

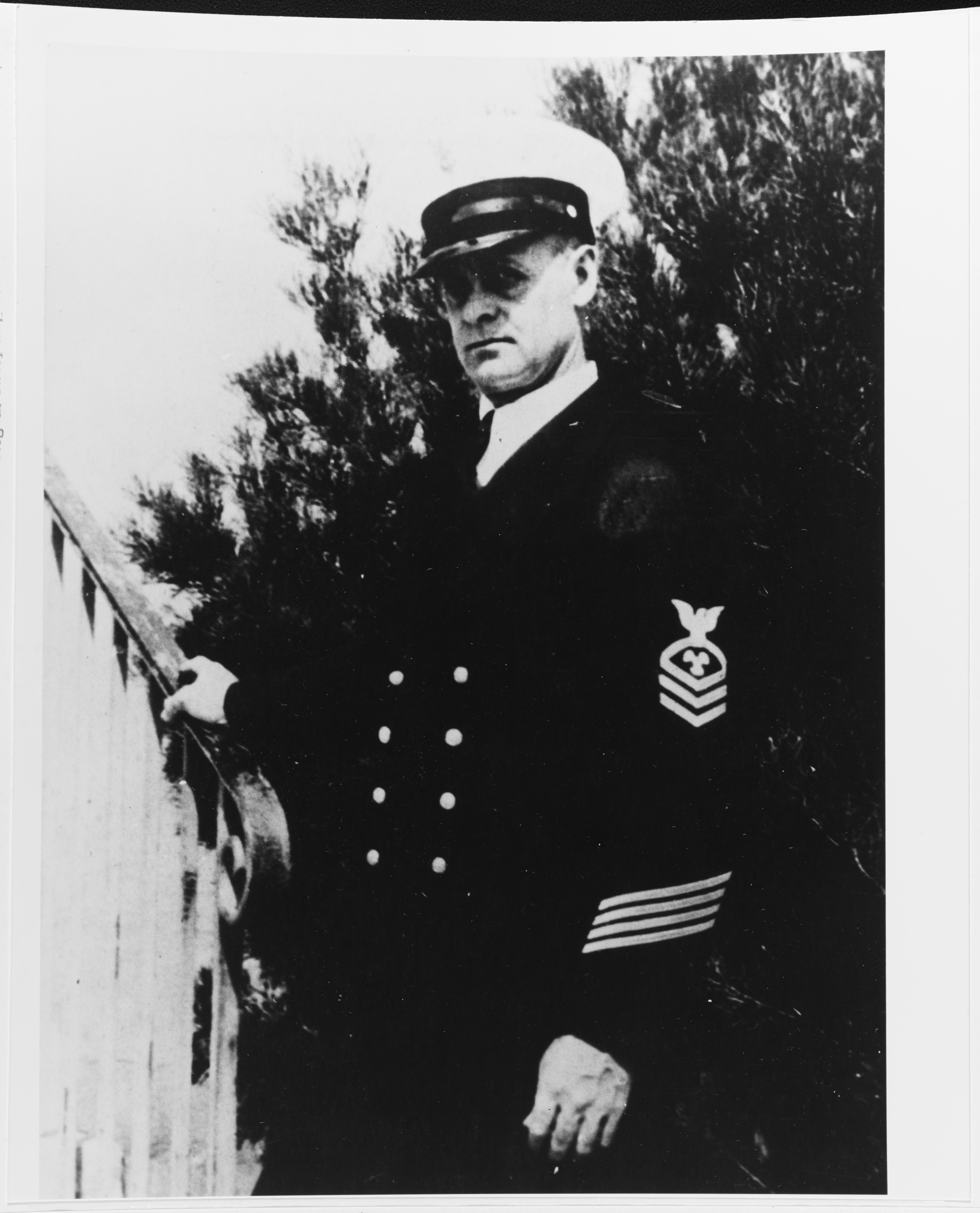
CPO Oscar V. Peterson

Sound seamanship and skilled damage control work kept Neosho afloat for the next four days. The stricken ship was first located by a Royal Australian Air Force aircraft, then an American PBY Catalina flying boat. At 13:00 on 11 May, the destroyer Henley arrived, rescued the 123 survivors and sank by gunfire the ship they had kept afloat. With Henley came word that the American fleet had succeeded in turning back the Japanese.

== Awards ==
- Combat Action Ribbon
- American Defense Service Medal with fleet clasp
- Asiatic-Pacific Campaign Medal with two battle stars
- World War II Victory Medal
