= Naval Fleet Auxiliary Force =

Component of the United States Navy's Military Sealift Command

The United States Navy Combat Logistics Force (CLF), formerly the Naval Fleet Auxiliary Force (NFAF), is a subordinate component of the United States Navy's Military Sealift Command. CLF's 39 ships are the supply lines that provide virtually everything that Navy ships at sea needs to accomplish its missions, including fuel, food, ordnance, spare parts, mail and other supplies. NFAF ships enable the Navy fleet to remain at sea, on station and combat ready for extended periods of time. CLF ships also conduct towing, rescue and salvage operations or serve as floating medical facilities. All CLF ships are government owned and crewed by civil service mariners. Some of the ships also have a small contingent of Navy personnel aboard for operations support, supply coordination and helicopter operations.

As a result of a 2012 reorganization, Naval Fleet Auxiliary Force was renamed Combat Logistics Force, with some of its ship categories being transferred to a new Service Support program.

== Fleet Replenishment Oilers ==
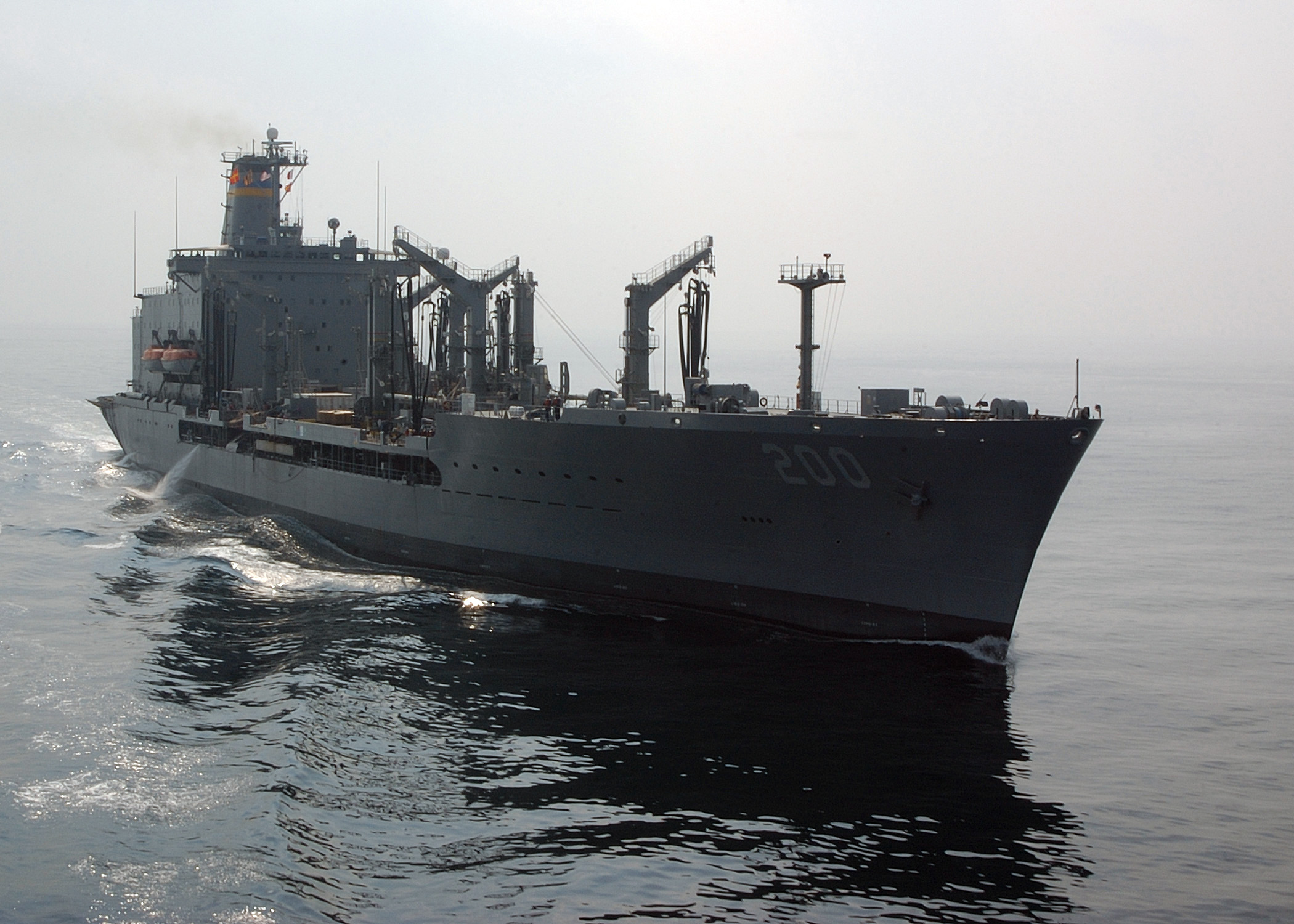
USNS Guadalupe (T-AO-200)

Fifteen fleet replenishment oilers, the largest subset of Naval Fleet Auxiliary Force ships, provide fuel to deployed Navy ships at sea, as well as to their assigned aircraft. Oilers and the ships they refuel sail side by side as fuel hoses are extended across guide wires. Underway replenishment of fuel dramatically extends the time a Navy battle group can remain at sea. The ships of the oiler fleet are as follows:

- USNS Henry J. Kaiser (T-AO-187)
- USNS Joshua Humphreys (T-AO-188)
- USNS John Lenthall (T-AO-189)
- USNS John Ericsson (T-AO-194)
- USNS Leroy Grumman (T-AO-195)
- USNS Kanawha (T-AO-196)
- USNS Pecos (T-AO-197)
- USNS Big Horn (T-AO-198)
- USNS Tippecanoe (T-AO-199)
- USNS Guadalupe (T-AO-200)
- USNS Patuxent (T-AO-201)
- USNS Yukon (T-AO-202)
- USNS Laramie (T-AO-203)
- USNS Rappahannock (T-AO-204)
- USNS John Lewis (T-AO-205)
- USNS Oscar V. Peterson (T-AO-206)
- USNS Earl Warren (T-AO-207)
- USNS Robert F. Kennedy (T-AO-208)

== Fast Combat Support Ships ==
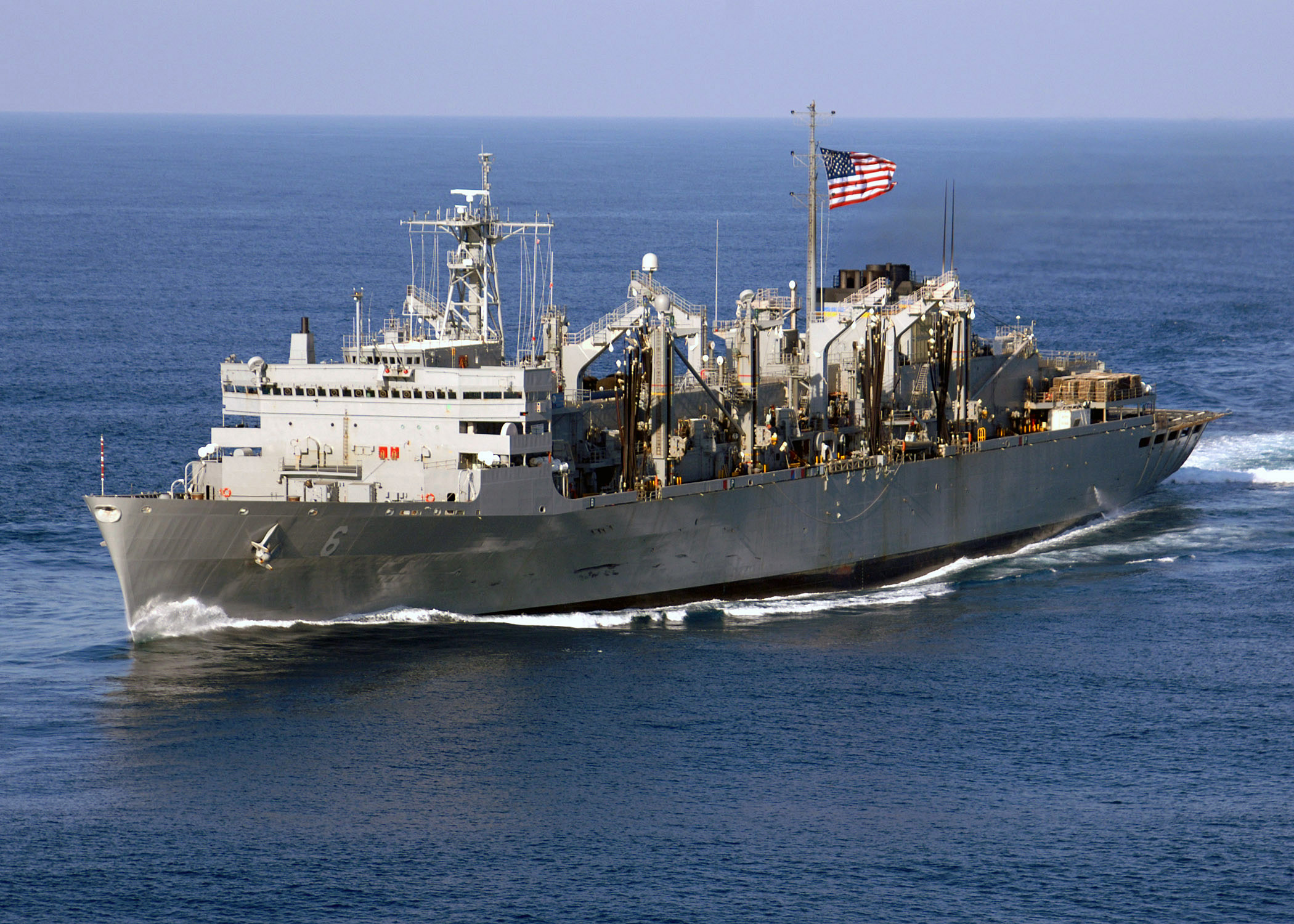
USNS Supply (T-AOE-6)

MSC's two fast combat support ships provide one-stop shopping to the fleet for fuel, ammunition, food and other cargo. These ships are especially valuable because of their speed and ability to carry all the essentials to replenish Navy ships at sea. MSC's fast combat support ships, formerly sailor-operated, transferred to MSC for civil service crewing beginning in 2001.

- USNS Supply (T-AOE-6)
- USNS Arctic (T-AOE-8)

== Dry Cargo/Ammunition Ships ==
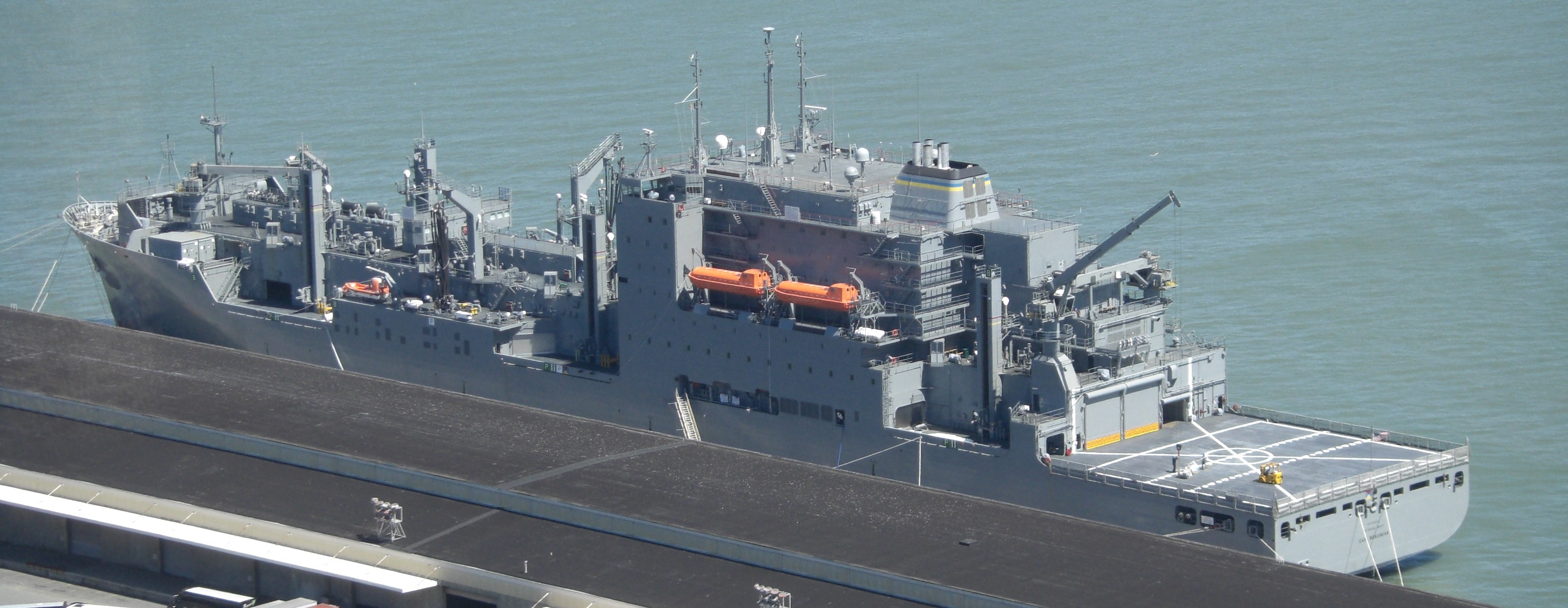
USNS Carl Brashear (T-AKE-7) docked at Pier 27 in San Francisco on 11 April 2009. Photo taken from Telegraph Hill.

The fourteen Military Sealift Command Lewis and Clark-class dry cargo/ammunition ships are a new class of ships dedicated to the Naval Fleet Auxiliary Force. These ships are able to deliver ammunition, provisions, stores, spare parts, potable water and petroleum products to the Navy's carrier strike groups and other naval forces worldwide. Designed to operate for extended periods at sea, the Lewis and Clark-class ships have improved cargo handling equipment that increases efficiency and makes the ships more cost effective to operate and maintain. All of the Lewis and Clark-class ships are named after great American pioneers. These ships are listed as follows:

- USNS Lewis and Clark (T-AKE-1)
- USNS Sacagawea (T-AKE-2)
- USNS Alan Shepard (T-AKE-3)
- USNS Richard E. Byrd (T-AKE-4)
- USNS Robert E. Peary (T-AKE-5)
- USNS Amelia Earhart (T-AKE-6)
- USNS Carl Brashear (T-AKE-7)
- USNS Wally Schirra (T-AKE-8)
- USNS Matthew Perry (T-AKE-9)
- USNS Charles Drew (T-AKE-10)
- USNS Washington Chambers (T-AKE-11)
- USNS William McLean (T-AKE-12)
- USNS Medgar Evers (T-AKE-13)
- USNS Cesar Chavez (T-AKE-14)

== Fleet Ocean Tugs ==
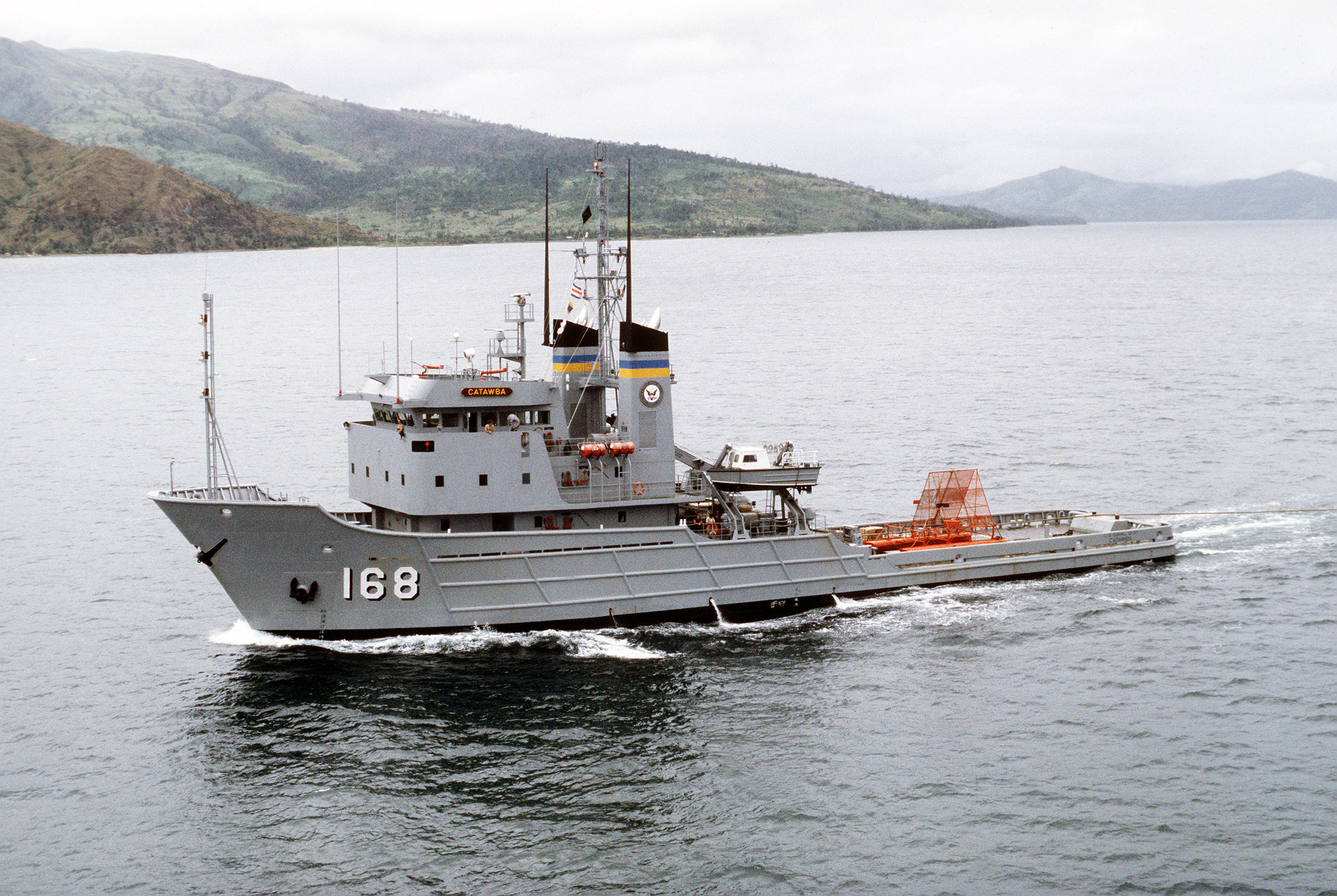
USNS Catawba (T-ATF-168)

The Military Sealift Command's fleet ocean tugs provide the Navy fleet with towing service and can tow Navy vessels as large as battleships. When augmented by Navy divers, fleet ocean tugs assist in the recovery of downed ships and aircraft. In addition, when carrying specialized equipment, the fleet ocean tugs can also perform submarine rescue operations. The Auxiliary fleet's tug is:

- USNS Catawba (T-ATF-168)

== Rescue and Salvage Ships ==
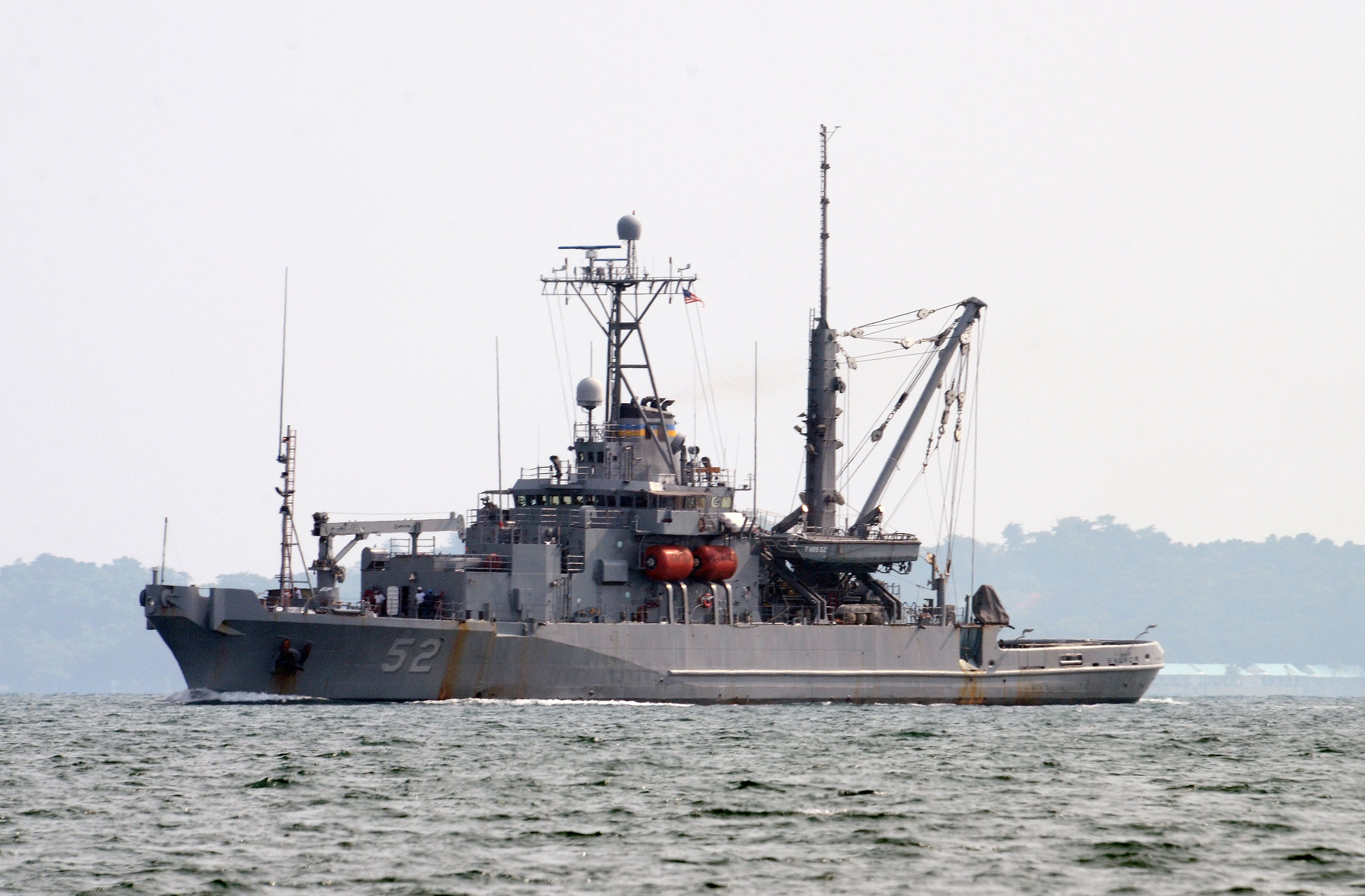
USNS Salvor (T-ARS-52)

The MSC's four rescue and salvage ships recover objects from the sea, tow or debeach stranded vessels and provide firefighting assistance. These ships, like fleet ocean tugs, are able to lift objects as heavy as downed ships and aircraft. The key advantage of these ships is their ability to rapidly deploy divers to conduct rescue and salvage operations. They are identified as follows:

- USNS Grasp (T-ARS-51)
- USNS Salvor (T-ARS-52)

== Hospital Ships ==
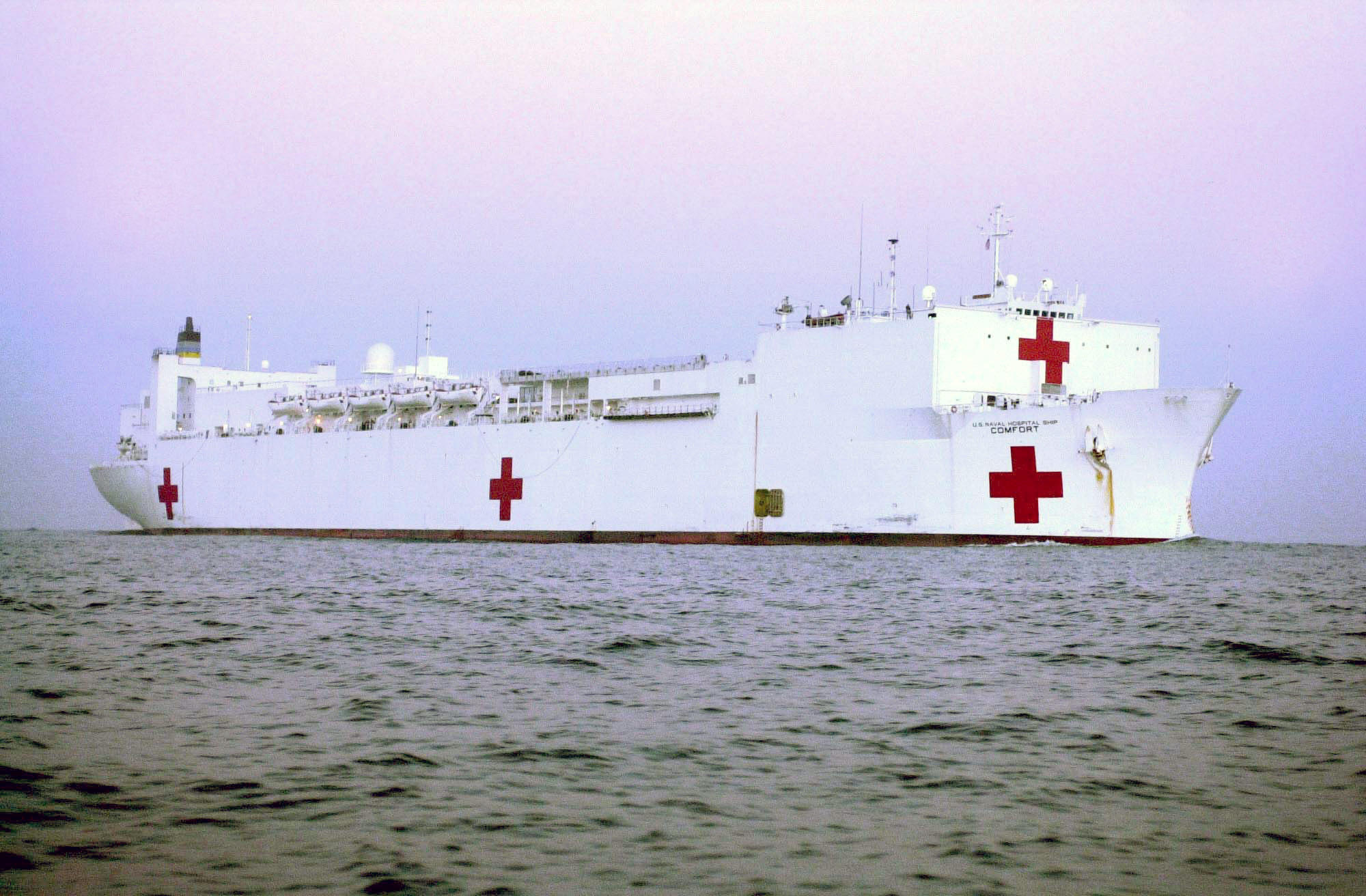
USNS Comfort (T-AH-20)

MSC's Naval Fleet Auxiliary Force operates the Navy's two hospital ships each containing 12 operating rooms and up to 1,000 beds. The ships are normally kept pierside in reduced operating status, each with a small contingent of MSC civil service mariners and Navy hospital personnel aboard to ensure the ships are ready should they be needed. When called into action, they can get underway in five days with an expanded crew of more than 60 civil service mariners and an expanded medical staff of up to approximately 1,200 military medical personnel. The Auxiliary Fleet's hospital ships are the:

- USNS Comfort (T-AH-20)
- USNS Mercy (T-AH-19)

== See also ==
- List of Military Sealift Command ships
