= List of ship launches in 1995 =

The list of ship launches in 1995 includes a chronological list of all ships launched in 1995.

Date	Ship	Class / type	Builder	Location	Country	Notes
14 January	Rappahannock	Henry J. Kaiser-class replenishment oiler	Avondale Shipyard	Avondale, Louisiana	United States	
14 January	Superfast II	Ro/Pax Ferry	Schichau Seebeckwerft	Bremerhaven	Germany	For Superfast Ferries
10 February	Cole	Arleigh Burke-class destroyer	Ingalls Shipbuilding	Pascagoula, Mississippi	United States	
18 February	Gonzalez	Arleigh Burke-class destroyer	Bath Iron Works	Bath, Maine	United States	
23 February	Mecklenburg-Vorpommern	Brandenburg-class frigate	Bremer Vulkan	Bremen-Vegesack	Germany	For German Navy
20 March	Delhi	Delhi-class destroyer	Mazagon Dock Limited	Mumbai	India	
20 March	Mumbai	Delhi-class destroyer	Mazagon Dock Limited	Mumbai	India	
31 March	David Church	Dredger	Appledore Shipbuilders Ltd.	Appledore	United Kingdom	For Dover Harbour Board.
16 April	Cheyenne	Los Angeles-class submarine	Newport News Shipbuilding and Drydock Company	Newport News, Virginia	United States	
18 April	Isle of Lewis	Ferry	Ferguson Shipbuilders	Port Glasgow	United Kingdom	For Caledonian MacBrayne
27 April	Sulzbach-Rosenberg	Frankenthal-class minehunter	Lürssen		Germany	For German Navy
28 April	Lowlands Trassey	Bulk Carrier	Harland & Wolff	Belfast	United Kingdom	For Trassey Shipping.
4 May	Shannon Dolphin	Ferry	Appledore Shipbuilders Ltd.	Appledore	United Kingdom	For Coldwater Investments Ltd.
6 May	Laramie	Henry J. Kaiser-class replenishment oiler	Avondale Shipyard	Avondale, Louisiana	United States	
May	Stena Explorer	HSS 1500	Finnyards Rauma	Rauma	Finland	For Stena Line
6 June	HSC NGV Asco	high-speed ferry	Chantiers Leroux et Lotz Naval	Saint-Malo	France	For Société Nationale Maritime Corse-Méditerranée
17 June	Splendour of the Seas	Vision-class cruise ship	Chantiers de l'Atlantique	Saint-Nazaire	France	For Royal Caribbean International
24 June	Seawolf	Seawolf-class submarine	Electric Boat	Groton, Connecticut	United States	
1 July	Arklow Brook	Bulk carrier	Appledore Shipbuilders Ltd.	Appledore	United Kingdom	For Devon Line Ltd.
12 July	Asashio	Harushio-class submarine			Japan	
13 July	Tzu I	Cheng Kung-class frigate	China Shipbuilding	Kaohsiung	Taiwan	
15 July	Wyoming	Ohio-class submarine	Electric Boat	Groton, Connecticut	United States	
22 July	Te Kaha	Anzac-class frigate	Tenix Defence	Williamstown, Victoria	Australia	For Royal New Zealand Navy
1 August	Milius	Arleigh Burke-class destroyer	Ingalls Shipbuilding	Pascagoula, Mississippi	United States	
12 August	The Sullivans	Arleigh Burke-class destroyer	Bath Iron Works	Bath, Maine	United States	
26 August	St. John's	Halifax-class frigate	Saint John Shipbuilding	Saint John, New Brunswick	Canada	
2 September	Costa Victoria	Sun-class cruise ship	Bremer Vulkan	Bremen-Vegesack	Germany	For Costa Crociere
2 October	Century	Cruise ship	Meyer Werft	Papenburg	Germany	For Celebrity Cruises
11 October	Ocean	Landing Platform Helicopter	Kvaerner Govan	Glasgow	United Kingdom	
14 October	Vigilant	Vanguard-class submarine	Vickers Shipbuilding and Engineering Ltd	Barrow-in-Furness	United Kingdom	For Royal Navy
16 October	Harusame	Murasame-class destroyer			Japan	
18 November	Regina Mærsk	K-class container ship	Odense Staalskibsvaerft	Lindø	Denmark	For Maersk Line
2 December	Fantastic	Ferry	Nuovi Cantieri Apunia	Marina di Carrara	Italy	For Grandi Navi Veloci
15 December	Farncomb	Collins-class submarine	Australian Submarine Corporation	Osborne, South Australia	Australia	
Unknown date	Georgina	Passenger launch	David Abels Boatbuilders Ltd.	Bristol	United Kingdom	For private owner.
Unknown date	Pill Hobbler III	Launch	David Abels Boatbuilders Ltd.	Bristol	United Kingdom	For Pill Hobbler Services Ltd.
