= John Lenthall =

John Lenthall may refer to:

- John Lenthall (Roundhead) (c. 1625–1681), English lawyer and member of parliament who was granted a baronetcy under the protectorate
- John Lenthall (shipbuilder) (1807–1882), American naval architect and shipbuilder
- USNS John Lenthall (T-AO-189), United States Navy fleet replenishment oiler in service since 1987
