= USNS Big Horn =

Oiler of the United States Navy

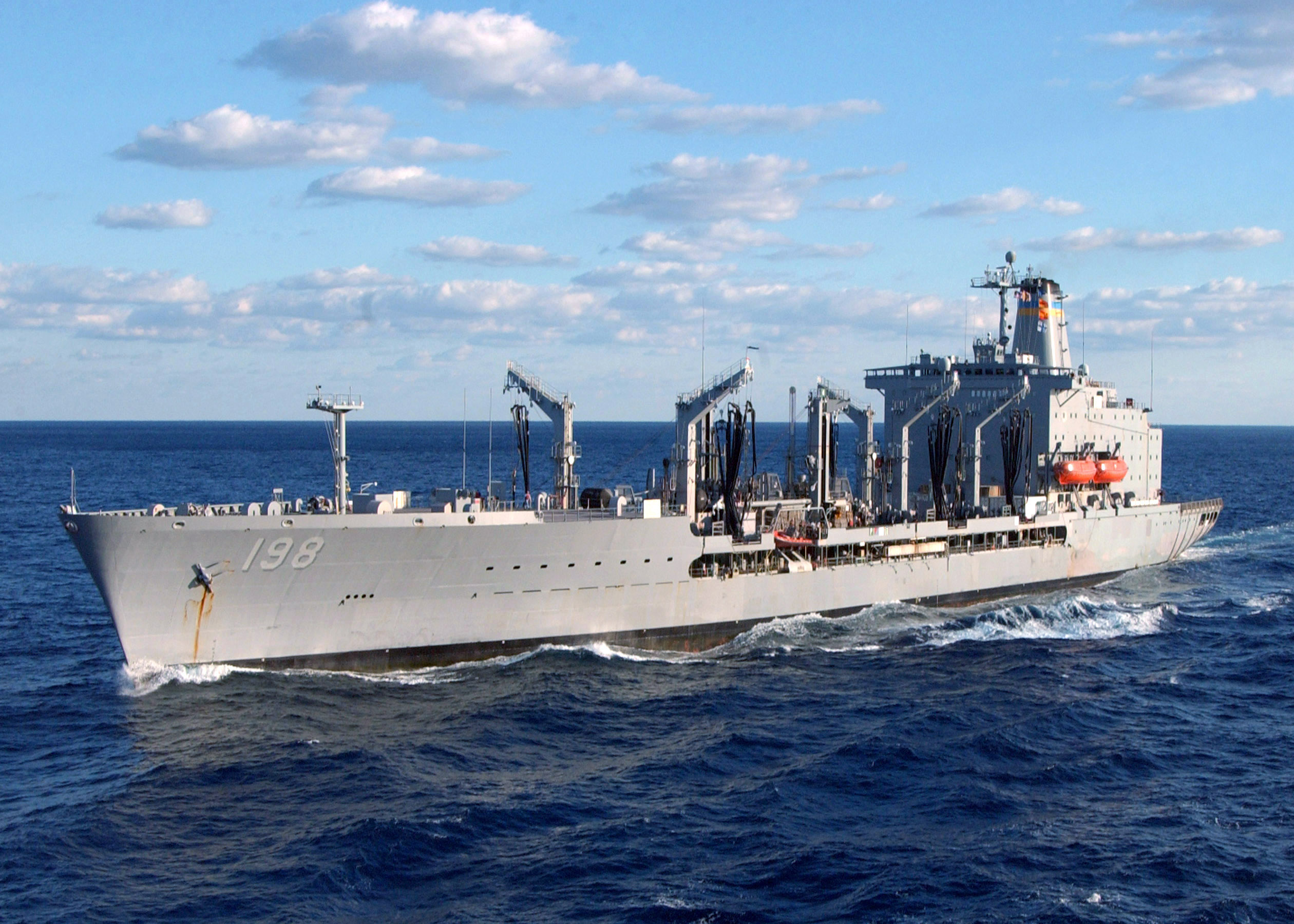
- USNS Big Horn (T-AO-198) in 2005

History

United States
- Name: Big Horn
- Namesake: The Bighorn River in Wyoming and Montana
- Ordered: 20 June 1988
- Builder: Avondale Shipyard, Inc., New Orleans, Louisiana
- Laid down: 9 October 1989
- Launched: 2 February 1991
- In service: 21 May 1992
- Out of service: 31 March 2026
- Identification: IMO number: 8812162; MMSI number: 368889000; Callsign: NBIG
- Status: Out of service, in reserve
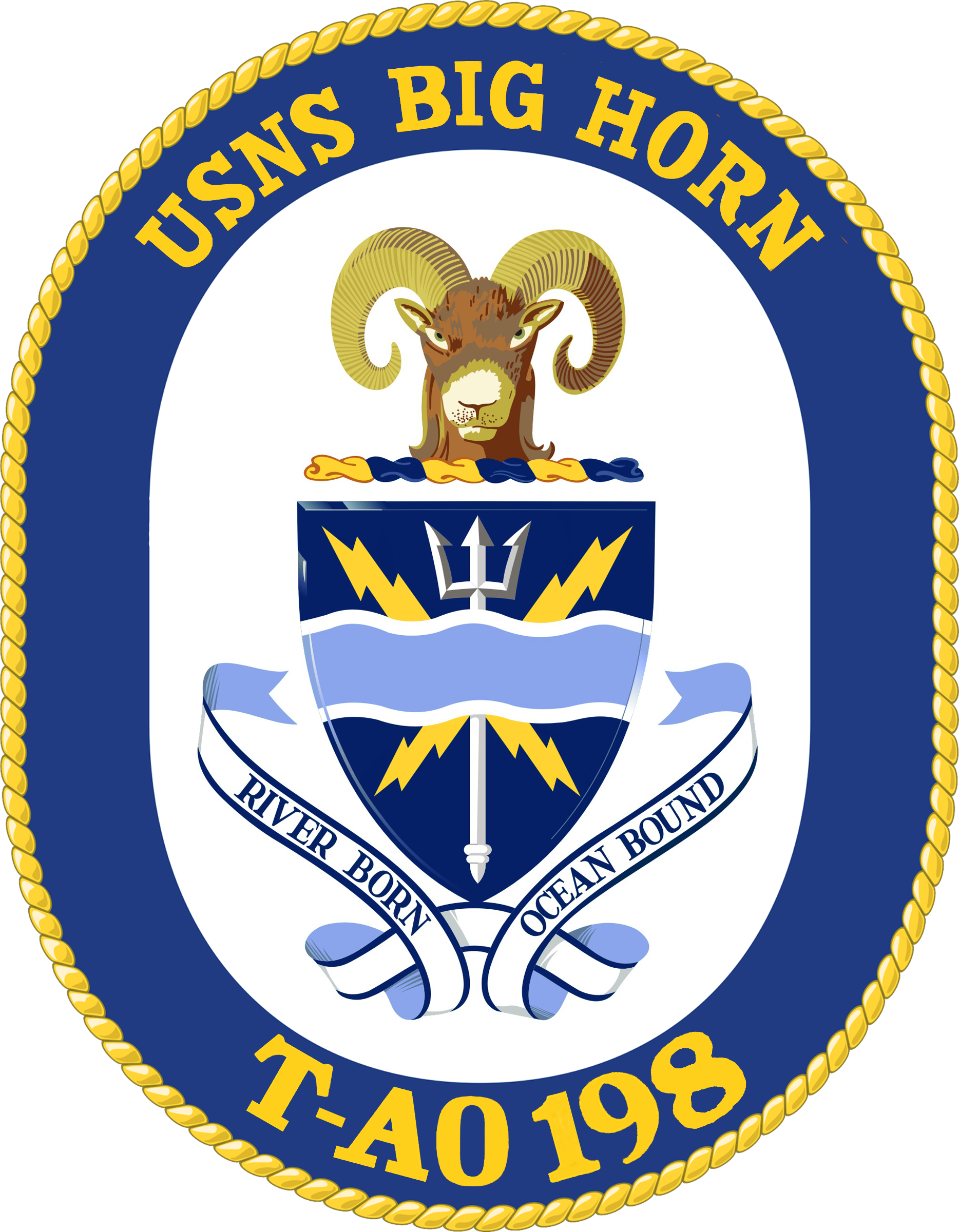
- Badge

General characteristics
- Class & type: Henry J. Kaiser-class replenishment oiler
- Tonnage: 31,200 DWT
- Displacement: 9,500 tons light; Full load variously reported as 42,382 tons and 40,700 long tons (41,353 metric tons)
- Length: 677 ft (206 m)
- Beam: 97 ft 5 in (29.69 m)
- Draft: 35 ft (11 m) maximum
- Installed power: 16,000 hp (12,000 kW) per shaft; 34,442 hp (25,683 kW) total sustained
- Propulsion: Two medium-speed Colt-Pielstick PC4-2/2 10V-570 diesel engines, two shafts, controllable-pitch propellers
- Speed: 20 knots (37 km/h; 23 mph)
- Capacity: 178,000 to 180,000 bbl (28,300 to 28,600 m^{3}) of fuel oil and jet fuel; 7,400 ft^{2} (690 m^{2}) dry cargo space; eight 20-foot (6.1 m) refrigerated containers with room for 128 pallets
- Complement: 103 (18 civilian officers, 1 U.S. Navy officer, 64 merchant seamen, 20 U.S. Navy enlisted personnel)
- Armament: Peacetime: usually none; Wartime: probably 2 × 20 mm Phalanx CIWS
- Aviation facilities: Helicopter landing platform
- Notes: Five refueling stations; Two dry cargo transfer rigs

USNS Big Horn (T-AO-198) is a Henry J. Kaiser-class replenishment oiler of the United States Navy. Big Horn was laid down on 9 October 1989 and launched on 2 February 1991. The ship entered service with Military Sealift Command on 21 May 1992 as part of the United States Atlantic Fleet.

== Construction and career ==
Big Horn, the twelfth ship of the Henry J. Kaiser class, was laid down at Avondale Shipyard, Inc., at New Orleans, Louisiana, on 9 October 1989 and launched on 2 February 1991. She entered non-commissioned U.S. Navy service under the control of the Military Sealift Command with a primarily civilian crew on 21 May 1992. She serves in the United States Atlantic Fleet.

This ship was one of several participating in disaster relief after the 2010 Haiti earthquake. Big Horn brought relief supplies to Haiti. During Operation Unified Response, Big Horn transferred 618 pallets of cargo and humanitarian assistance/disaster relief supplies and over 2,000,000 US gal (7,600,000 L) of fuel. Big Horn got underway from Naval Station Norfolk the day after the earthquake struck, arrived on scene in Haiti on 17 January and worked until being relieved by USNS Leroy Grumman on 11 February. In 2015, she refueled RFA Gold Rover in the South Atlantic.

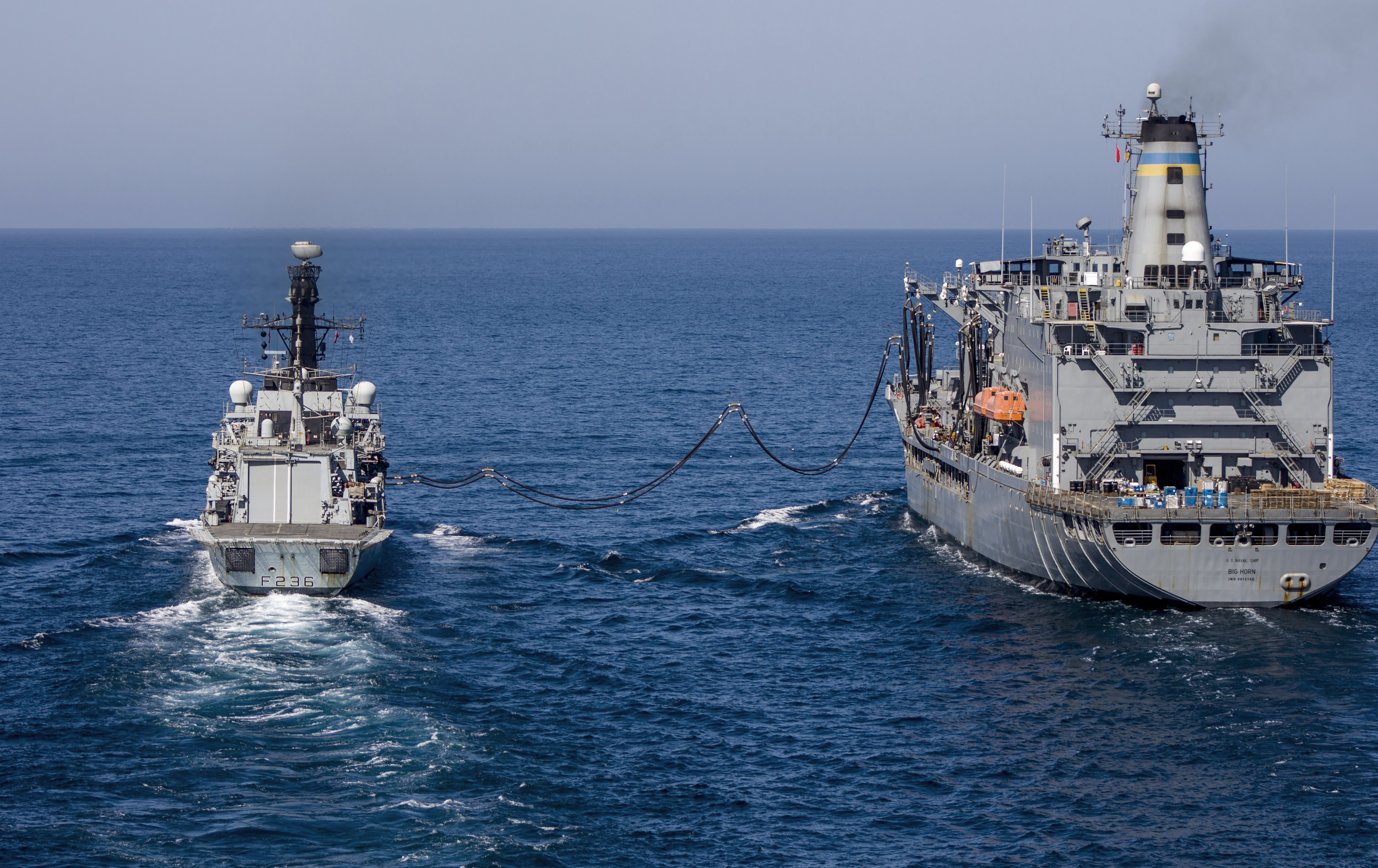
Replenishing HMS Montrose in 2021

In September 2024, she ran aground off Oman while attached to USS Abraham Lincoln's strike group. The incident strained American logistics within the fleet amid rising tensions due to Israeli–Hezbollah conflict as she was the only oiler in the region. She was quickly brought into a local port, and no casualties or oil spills were reported; images showing minor flooding were released.

She was taken out of service on 31 March 2026 and the Navy announced it would transfer the USNS Big Horn to the US Maritime Administration.
