= USNS Andrew J. Higgins =

Oiler of the United States Navy

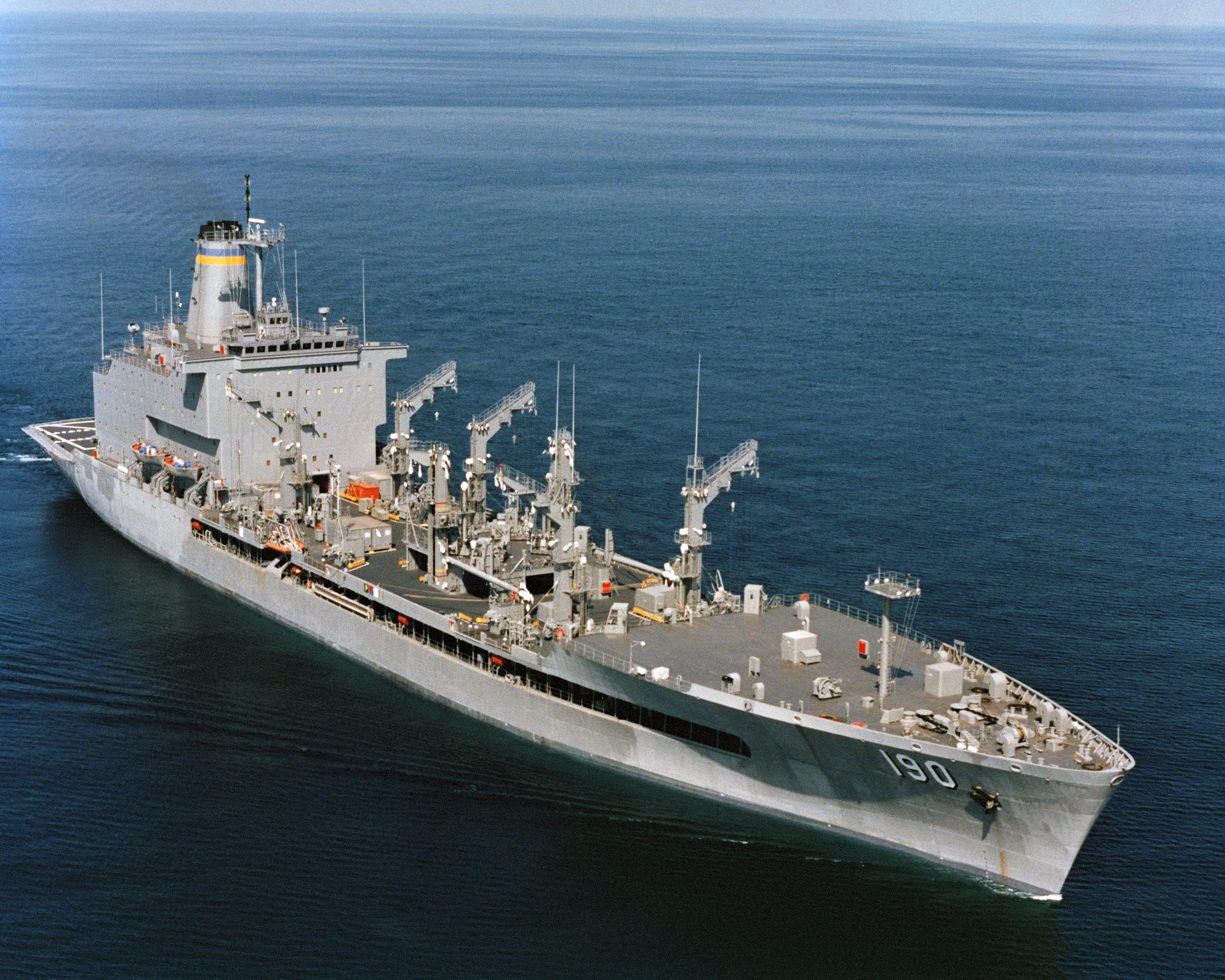
- USNS Andrew J. Higgins in September 1987

History

United States
- Name: USNS Andrew J. Higgins
- Namesake: Andrew Higgins (1886-1952), American shipbuilder
- Ordered: 22 November 1983
- Builder: Avondale Shipyard, Inc., New Orleans, Louisiana
- Laid down: 21 November 1985
- Launched: 17 January 1987
- In service: 22 October 1987
- Out of service: 6 May 1996
- Stricken: 6 January 2009
- Fate: Sold to Chile 19 May 2009
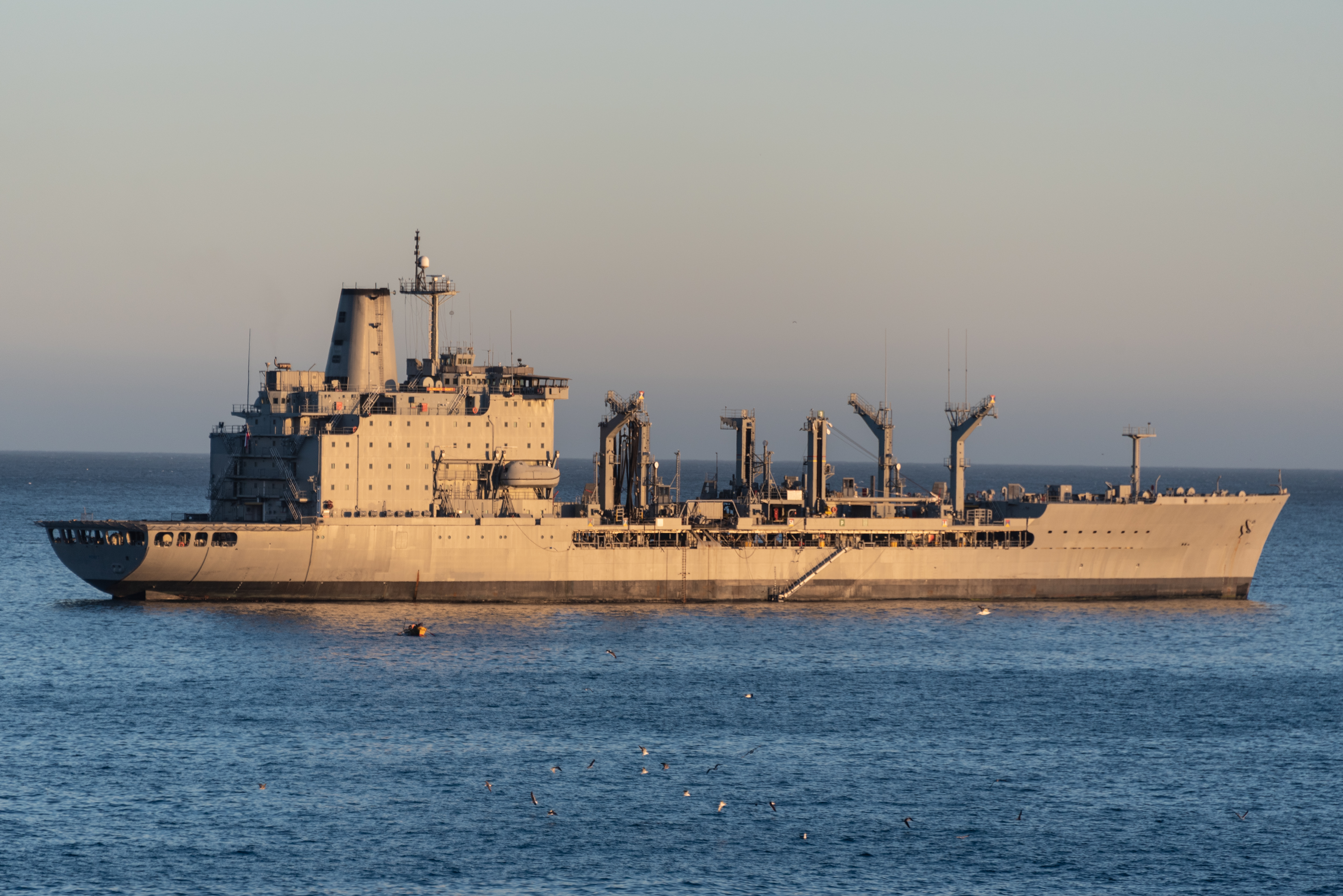
- Almirante Montt off Valparaíso, Chile, in March 2019.

Chile
- Name: Almirante Montt
- Namesake: Jorge Montt (1845-1922), Chilean Navy vice admiral, President of Chile (1891–1896)
- Operator: Chilean Navy
- Acquired: 19 May 2009
- Commissioned: 10 February 2010
- Identification: IMO number: 8325559

General characteristics
- Class & type: Henry J. Kaiser-class oiler
- Tonnage: 31,200 deadweight tons
- Displacement: 9,500 tons light; Full load variously reported as 42,382 tons and 40,700 long tons (41,353 metric tons)
- Length: 677 ft (206 m)
- Beam: 97 ft 5 in (29.69 m)
- Draft: 35 ft (11 m) maximum
- Installed power: 16,000 hp (12,000 kW) per shaft; 34,442 hp (25,683 kW) total sustained
- Propulsion: Two medium-speed Colt-Pielstick PC4-2/2 10V-570 diesel engines, two shafts, controllable-pitch propellers
- Speed: 20 knots (37 km/h; 23 mph)
- Capacity: 178,000 to 180,000 barrels (29,000 m^{3}) of fuel oil and jet fuel; 7,400 square feet dry cargo space; eight 20-foot (6.1 m) refrigerated containers with room for 128 pallets
- Complement: 103 (18 civilian officers, 1 U.S. Navy officer, 64 merchant seamen, 20 U.S. Navy enlisted personnel)
- Armament: Peacetime: none; Wartime: probably 2 x 20-mm Phalanx CIWS
- Aircraft carried: None – probably can facilitate Chilean Navy Eurocopter AS332 Super Puma
- Aviation facilities: aft deck Helicopter landing platform
- Notes: Five refueling stations; Two dry cargo transfer rigs

USNS Andrew J. Higgins (T-AO-190) was a Henry J. Kaiser-class oiler of the United States Navy which saw active service from 1987 to 1996. Sold to Chile in 2009, she was commissioned as Almirante Montt in the Chilean Navy in 2010.

== Construction ==
Andrew J. Higgins, the fourth ship of the Henry J. Kaiser class, was laid down at Avondale Shipyard, Inc., at New Orleans, Louisiana, on 21 November 1985 and launched on 17 January 1987. She was named after Andrew Higgins, the man credited with developing the landing craft, vehicle, personnel (LCVP), or "Higgins Boat", of World War II.

== Service history ==
=== U.S. Navy ===
Andrew J. Higgins entered non-commissioned U.S. Navy service under Military Sealift Command control with a primarily civilian crew on 22 October 1987. She was taken out of active service on 6 May 1996 and placed in reserve in the National Defense Reserve Fleet in Suisun Bay at Benicia, California, where she remained until September 2009. She was the first ship of her class to be taken out of service.

In 2008, Andrew J. Higgins was selected for transfer to Chile as a Foreign Assistance Act grant. She was stricken from the Naval Vessel Register on 6 January 2009 and sold to Chile on 19 May 2009. She was withdrawn from the Reserve Fleet at Suisun Bay on 24 September 2009 and towed to the Atlantic Marine Alabama shipyard at Mobile, Alabama, to undergo a three-month refit and overhaul.

=== Chilean Navy ===
Renamed Almirante Montt with the identification number AO-52, the oiler was commissioned in the Chilean Navy on 10 February 2010, replacing the oiler Araucano.

In an effort to address the Royal Canadian Navy's at-sea support services capability gap until the arrival of its new Protecteur-class supply ships, Canada signed a Mutual Logistic Support Arrangement with Chile in 2015. As part of that arrangement, the Chilean Navy operated Almirante Montt for 40 sea days in the Canadian Pacific region in support of Royal Canadian Navy training requirements in July and August 2015, working with the frigates HMCS Calgary and HMCS Vancouver. Almirante Montt returned to Canada in 2016, operating with the Royal Canadian Navy from April to June 2016.
