= USNS Patuxent =

Oiler of the United States Navy

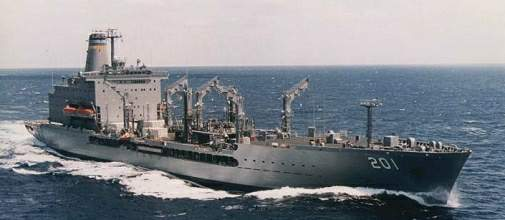
- USNS Patuxent (T-AO-201)

History

United States
- Name: USNS Patuxent
- Namesake: The Patuxent River in Maryland
- Ordered: 24 March 1989
- Builder: Avondale Shipyard, Inc., New Orleans, Louisiana
- Laid down: 16 October 1991
- Launched: 23 July 1994
- In service: 21 June 1995-present
- Identification: IMO number: 8906614; MMSI number: 367863000; Callsign: NPCZ
- Status: In active Military Sealift Command service

General characteristics
- Class & type: Henry J. Kaiser-class replenishment oiler
- Tonnage: 31,200 DWT
- Displacement: 9,500 tons light; 42,000 long tons (43,000 t) full load
- Length: 677 ft (206 m)
- Beam: 97 ft 5 in (29.69 m)
- Draft: 35 ft (11 m) maximum
- Installed power: 16,000 hp (12,000 kW) per shaft; 34,442 hp (25,683 kW) total sustained
- Propulsion: Two medium-speed Colt-Pielstick PC4-2/2 10V-570 diesel engines, two shafts, controllable-pitch propellers
- Speed: 20 knots (37 km/h; 23 mph)
- Capacity: 159,000 barrels (25,300 m^{3}) of fuel oil and jet fuel; 7,400 sq ft (690 m^{2}) dry cargo space; 8 20-foot (6.1 m) refrigerated containers with room for 128 pallets
- Complement: 1 U.S. Navy officer; 20 U.S. Navy enlisted personnel; 18 civilian officers; 64 merchant seamen; 103 total
- Aviation facilities: Helicopter landing platform
- Notes: Five refueling stations; Two dry cargo transfer rigs

USNS Patuxent (T-AO-201) is a Henry J. Kaiser-class underway replenishment oiler operated by the Military Sealift Command to support ships of the United States Navy.

Patuxent, the fifteenth ship of the Henry J. Kaiser class, was laid down at Avondale Shipyard, Inc., at New Orleans, Louisiana, on 16 October 1991 and launched on 23 July 1994. She was the first of three ships in the class of eighteen—the other two being USNS Laramie and USNS Rappahannock—to be built with a double hull required by the Oil Pollution Act of 1990. Hull separation is 6 feet (1.8 m) at the sides and 6 ft 6 in (1.98 m) at the bottom, reducing her liquid cargo capacity by about 21,000 barrels (3,300 m^{3}) from that of the 15 single-hull ships in the class.

Patuxent entered non-commissioned U.S. Navy service under the control of the Military Sealift Command with a primarily civilian crew on 21 June 1995. She serves in the United States Atlantic Fleet.

== Design ==
The Henry J. Kaiser-class replenishment oilers were preceded by the shorter Cimarron-class fleet replenishment oilers. Patuxent has an overall length of 206.5 metres (677 ft 6 in). It has a beam of 29.7 metres (97 ft 5 in) and a draft of 11 metres (36 ft 1 in). The oiler has a displacement of 41,353 tonnes (40,700 long tons) at full load. It has a capacity of 180,000 imperial barrels (29,000,000 L; 6,500,000 imp gal; 7,800,000 US gal) of aviation fuel or fuel oil. It can carry a dry load of 690 square metres (7,400 sq ft) and can refrigerate 128 pallets of food. The ship is powered by two 10 PC4.2 V 570 Colt-Pielstick diesel engines that drive two shafts; this gives a power of 25.6 megawatts (34,800 PS; 34,300 shp).

The Henry J. Kaiser-class oilers have maximum speeds of 20 knots (37 km/h; 23 mph). They were built without armaments but can be fitted with close-in weapon systems. The ship has a helicopter platform, but no maintenance facilities. It is fitted with five fueling stations; these can fill two ships at the same time and the ship is capable of pumping 900,000 US gallons (3,400,000 L; 750,000 imp gal) of diesel or 540,000 US gallons (2,000,000 L; 450,000 imp gal) of jet fuel per hour. It has a complement of eighty-nine civilians (nineteen officers), twenty-nine spare crew, and six United States Navy crew.
