= USNS John Ericsson =

Oiler of the United States Navy

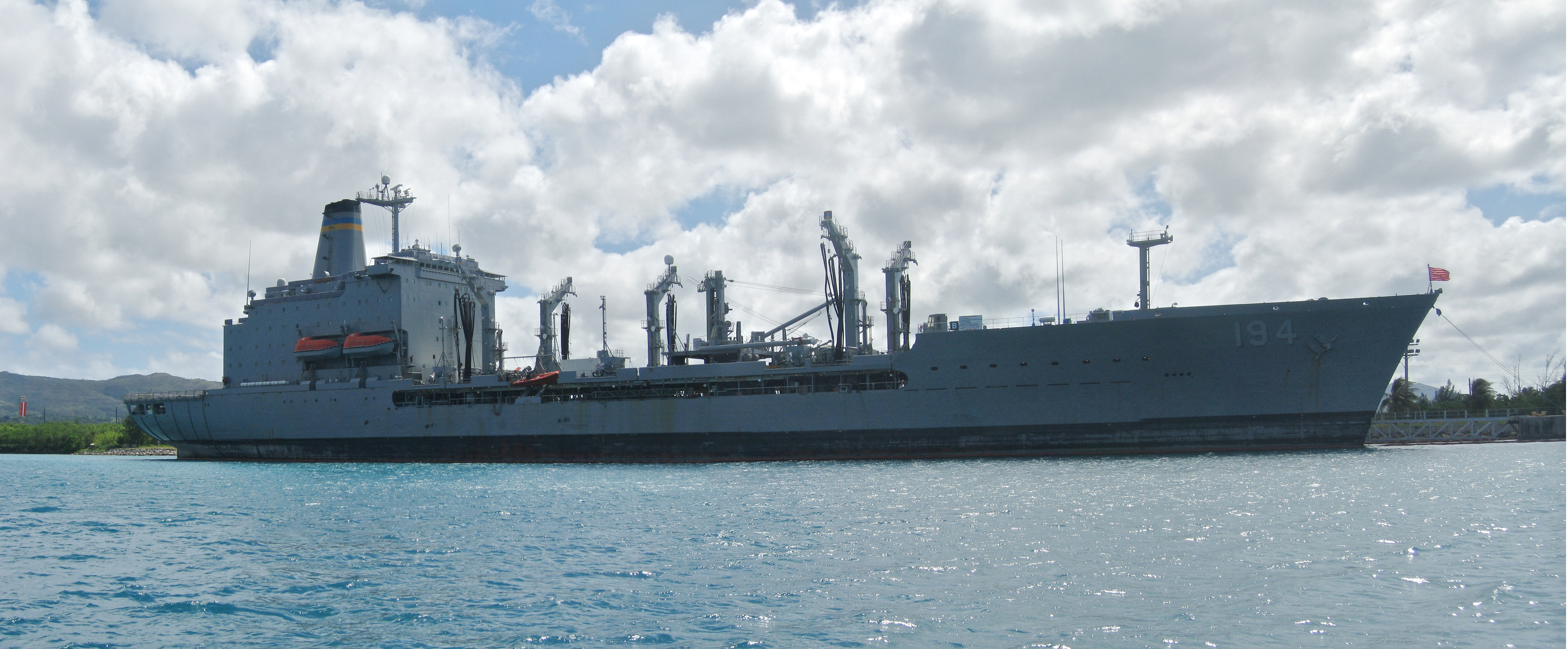
- USNS John Ericsson in Apra Harbor, Guam

History

United States
- Name: USNS John Ericsson (T-AO-194)
- Namesake: John Ericsson (1803–1889), a Swedish inventor and mechanical engineer primarily active in the United States
- Awarded: 1 February 1986
- Builder: Sun Shipbuilding & Drydock Company, Chester, Pennsylvania
- Laid down: 15 March 1989
- Launched: 21 April 1990
- In service: 18 March 1991
- Out of service: 31 July 2026
- Identification: IMO number: 8511512; MMSI number: 367221000; Callsign: NNJE
- Status: Inactive

General characteristics
- Class & type: Henry J. Kaiser-class replenishment oiler
- Type: Fleet replenishment oiler
- Tonnage: 31,200 long tons (31,700 t) deadweight
- Displacement: 9,500 long tons (9,650 metric tons) light; Full load variously reported as 42,382 and 40,700 long tons (43,062 and 41,353 t)
- Length: 677 ft (206 m)
- Beam: 97 ft 5 in (29.69 m)
- Draft: 35 ft (11 m) maximum
- Installed power: 16,000 hp (11.9 MW) per shaft; 34,442 hp (25.7 MW) total sustained
- Propulsion: Two medium-speed Colt-Pielstick PC4-2/2 10V-570 diesel engines, two shafts, controllable-pitch propellers
- Speed: 20 knots (37 km/h)
- Capacity: 178,000 to 180,000 barrels (28,300 to 28,600 m^{3}) of fuel oil and jet fuel; 7,400 square feet (690 m^{2}) dry cargo space; eight 20-foot refrigerated containers with room for 128 pallets
- Complement: 103 (18 civilian officers, 1 U.S. Navy officer, 64 merchant seamen, 20 U.S. Navy enlisted personnel)
- Armament: Peacetime: none; Wartime: probably 2 x 20 mm Phalanx CIWS
- Aircraft carried: None
- Aviation facilities: Helicopter landing platform
- Notes: Five refueling stations; Two dry cargo transfer rigs

USNS John Ericsson (T-AO-194) was a Henry J. Kaiser-class underway replenishment oiler operated by the Military Sealift Command to support ships of the United States Navy.

== Design ==
The Henry J. Kaiser-class replenishment oilers were preceded by the shorter Cimarron-class fleet replenishment oilers. John Ericsson has an overall length of 206.5 metres (677 ft 6 in). It has a beam of 29.7 metres (97 ft) and a draft of 11 metres (36 ft). The oiler has a displacement of 41,353 tonnes (40,700 long tons; 45,584 short tons) at full load. It has a capacity of 180,000 imperial barrels (29,000,000 L; 6,500,000 imp gal; 7,800,000 US gal) of aviation fuel or fuel oil. It can carry a dry load of 690 square metres (7,400 sq ft) and can refrigerate 128 pallets of food for consumption or storage. The ship is powered by two 10 PC4.2 V 570 Colt-Pielstick diesel engines that drive two shafts; this gives a power of 25.6 megawatts (34,800 PS; 34,300 shp).

The Henry J. Kaiser-class oilers have maximum speeds of 20 knots (37 km/h; 23 mph). They were built without armaments but can be fitted with close-in weapon system. The ship has a helicopter platform but not any maintenance facilities. It is fitted with five fuelling stations; these can fill two ships at the same time and the ship is capable of pumping 900,000 US gallons (3,400,000 L; 750,000 imp gal) of diesel or 540,000 US gallons (2,000,000 L; 450,000 imp gal) of jet fuel per hour. It has a complement of eighty-nine civilians (nineteen officers), twenty-nine spare crew, and six United States Navy crew.

== Construction and delivery ==
John Ericsson, the eighth ship of the Henry J. Kaiser class, was laid down at Sun Shipbuilding and Drydock Company at Chester, Pennsylvania, on 15 March 1989 and launched on 21 April 1990. She entered non-commissioned United States Navy service under the control of the Military Sealift Command with a primarily civilian crew on 18 March 1991.

== Service history ==
John Ericsson serves in the United States Pacific Fleet. In March 2014, she was sent to help with refueling and logistics connected with the USS Pinckney's role in helping the search for missing Malaysia Airlines Flight 370.

The Navy announced it would inactivate the USNS John Ericsson on 31 July 2026.

== Photos ==
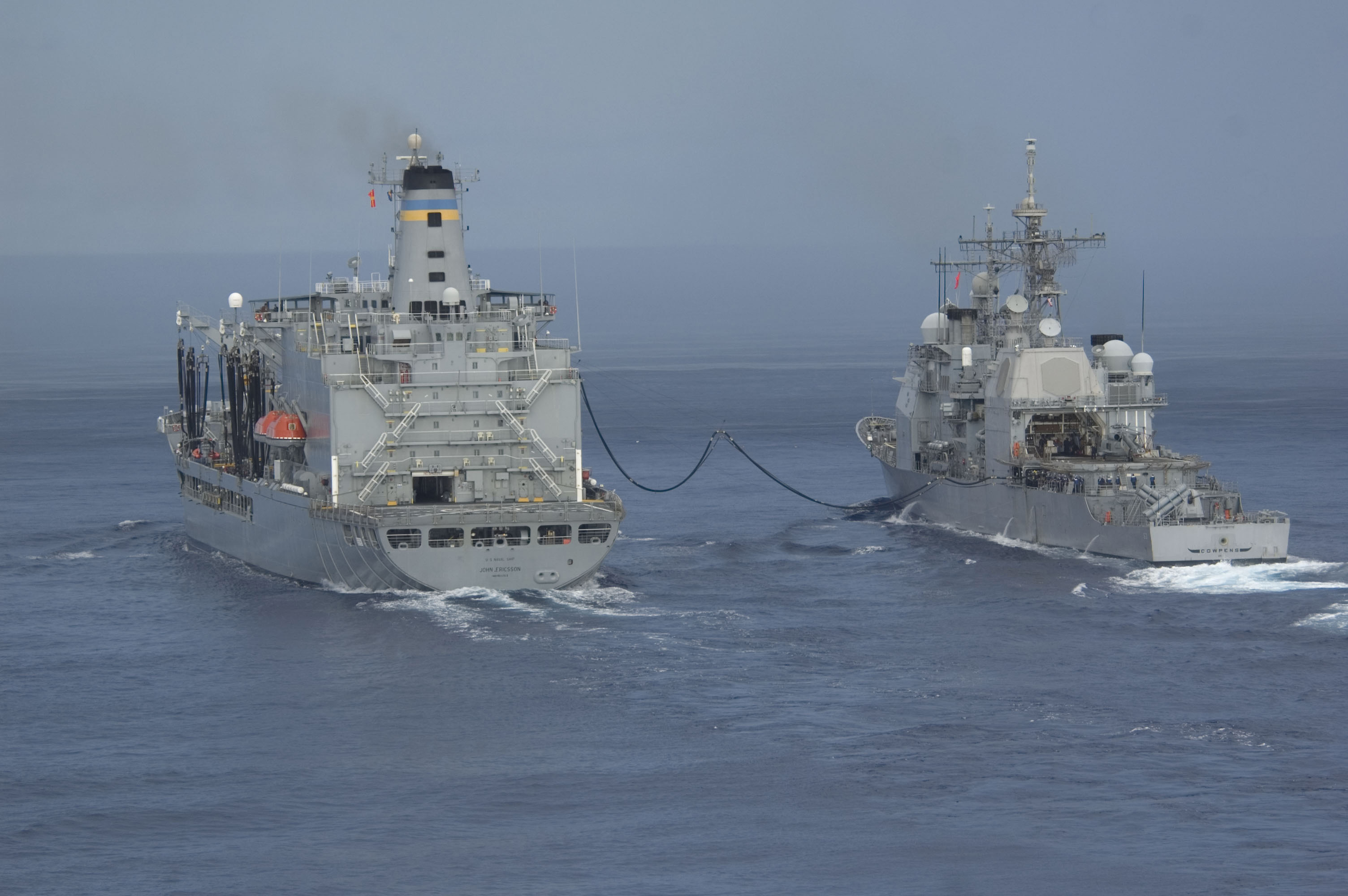
John Ericsson refueling guided-missile cruiser USS Cowpens (CG-63) in August 2007.

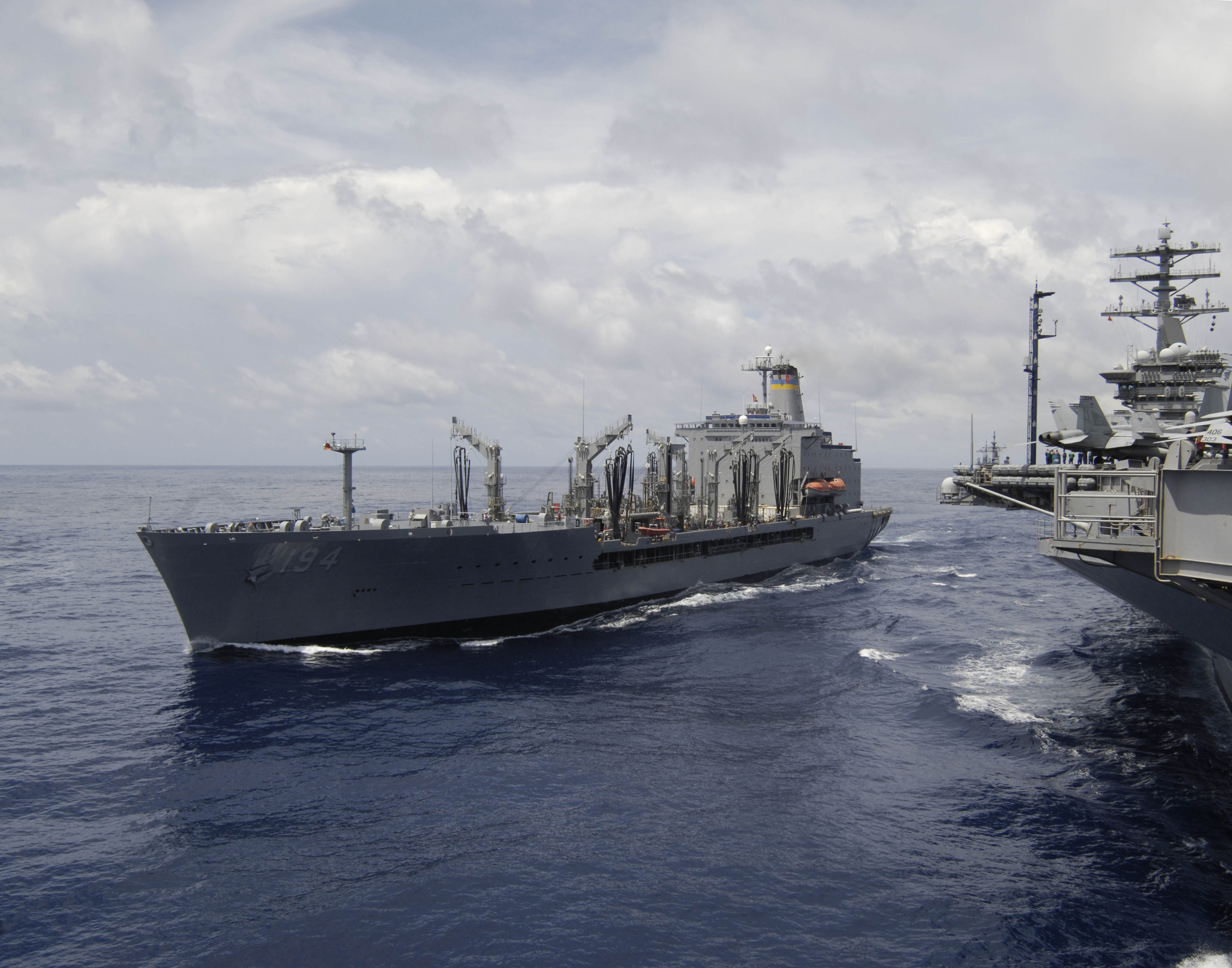
John Ericsson refueling aircraft carrier USS Nimitz (CVN-68) in September 2009.

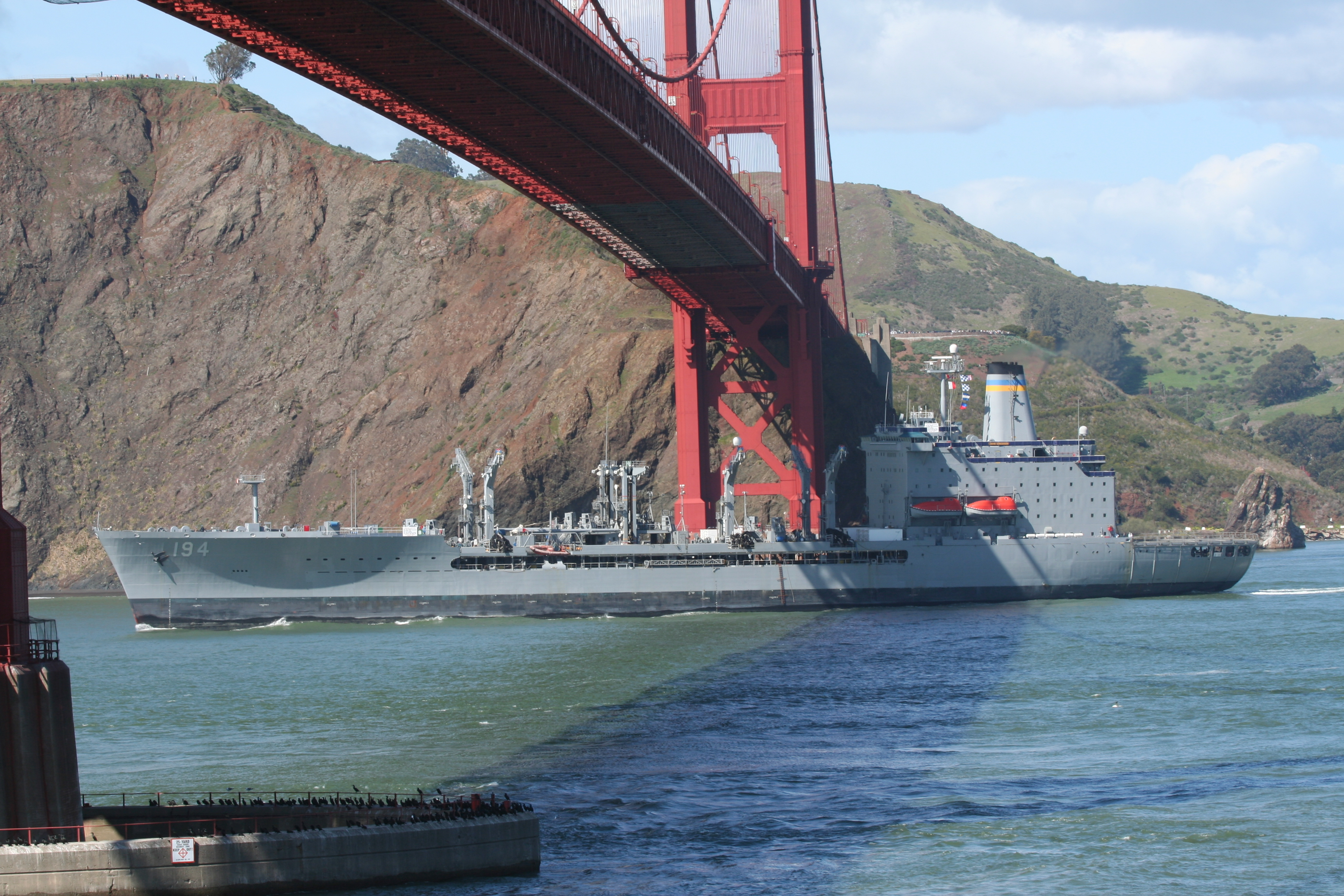
John Ericsson (T-AO-194) in San Francisco Bay
