= Henry J. Kaiser-class replenishment oiler =

Class of replenishment oiler craft

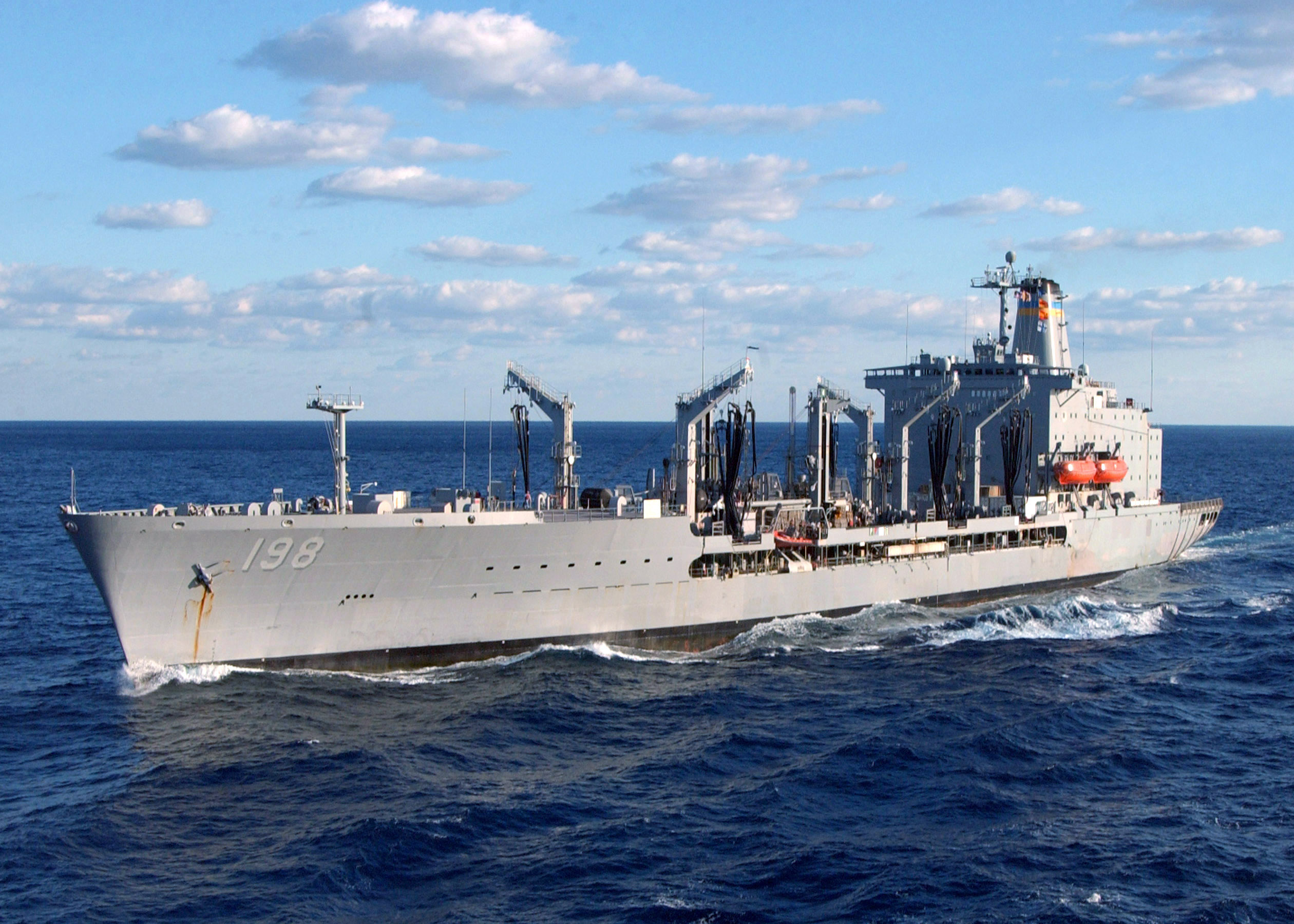
- USNS Big Horn (T-AO-198)

Class overview
- Name: Henry J. Kaiser class
- Builders: Avondale Shipyard, Inc., New Orleans, Louisiana (16 ships); Pennsylvania Shipbuilding Company, Philadelphia, Pennsylvania, and Tampa Shipyards, Inc., Tampa, Florida (2 ships; neither completed)
- Preceded by: Cimarron class
- Succeeded by: John Lewis class
- Built: August 1984 – May 1996
- In service: December 1986 – present
- Planned: 18
- Completed: 16
- Canceled: 2 (Ship hulls scrapped in 2011)
- Active: 11 US, 1 Chile as of 1 March 2011
- Retired: 4

General characteristics
- Type: Fleet replenishment oiler
- Tonnage: 31,200 DWT
- Displacement: All ships: 9,500 tons light; Patuxent, Laramie, and Rappahannock: 42,000 long tons (42,674 metric tons) full load; All other ships: Variously reported as 40,700 long tons (41,353 metric tons) and as 42,382 tons full load
- Length: 677 ft (206.3 m)
- Beam: 97 ft 5 in (29.7 m)
- Draft: 35 ft (10.7 m) maximum
- Installed power: 16,000 hp (12,000 kW) per shaft; 34,442 hp (25,683 kW) total sustained
- Propulsion: Two medium-speed Colt-Pielstick PC4-2/2 10V-570 diesel engines, two shafts, controllable pitch propellers
- Speed: 20 knots (37 km/h)
- Capacity: Patuxent, Laramie, and Rappahannock: 159,000 bbl (25,300 m^{3}) of fuel oil and jet fuel; Other ships:178,000 to 180,000 bbl (28,300 to 28,600 m^{3}) of fuel oil and jet fuel; All ships: 7,400 sq ft (690 m^{2}) of dry cargo space; eight 20 ft (6.1 m) refrigerated containers with room for 128 pallets
- Complement: 66 to 89 civilian personnel and 7 to 24 U.S. Navy personnel
- Sensors & processing systems: 2 × AN/SPS-59 LN-66 surface search radars
- Electronic warfare & decoys: AN/SLQ-25 Nixie Torpedo Countermeasures
- Armament: Multiple .50 caliber machine guns; Space, weight, and power reservations for 2 Phalanx Close-In Weapons Systems
- Aviation facilities: Helicopter landing platform
- Notes: 5 refueling stations; 2 dry cargo transfer rigs

The Henry J. Kaiser class is an American class of eighteen fleet replenishment oilers which began construction in August 1984. The class comprises fifteen oilers which are operated by Military Sealift Command to provide underway replenishment of fuel to United States Navy combat ships and jet fuel for aircraft aboard aircraft carriers at sea.

Twelve of the Kaisers are not double-hulled like most modern tankers. The class will be replaced by the John Lewis-class replenishment oiler.

One ship, operated by the United States from 1987 to 1996, was sold to Chile in 2009 and commissioned into the Chilean Navy in 2010. Two ships were scrapped in 2011 while still incomplete.

== Technical overview ==
There are stations on both sides of each ship for underway replenishment of fuel and stores. The ships in this class have a small capacity to carry and transfer fresh and frozen foods as well as other materials, and have two dry cargo transfer rigs.

Patuxent, Laramie, and Rappahannock differ from the other 15 ships, in having double hulls to meet the requirements of the Oil Pollution Act of 1990. Hull separation is 6 feet (1.8 m) at the sides and 6 feet 6 inches (1.98 m) on the bottom. This resulted in a 12% reduction in cargo capacity.

== Construction program ==
The circumstances of the construction program were convoluted and it is worthwhile to spell them out here. The original contract, for T-AO 187, was awarded to Avondale Industries, (Avondale), in November 1982. This contract included options for T-AOs 188, 189 and 190, which were exercised in January 1983, (T-AO 188) and November 1983, (T-AOs 189 and 190). A second-source contract, for T-AOs 191 and 192, was awarded to Pennsylvania Shipbuilding Company, (Penn Ship), in May 1985.

This contract included options for T-AOs 194 and 196, which were never exercised. After Penn Ship began to have cash flow problems, the Navy transferred these options from Penn Ship's contract to Avondale's contract and exercised them in June 1988. Additional options on Avondale's contract were executed in June 1985 for T-AO 193, in February 1986 for T-AO 195, in February 1987 for T-AO 197, in June 1988 for T-AO 198, in October 1988 for T-AOs 200, 202 and 204, and in March 1989 for T-AOs 199, 201 and 203.

The Navy's contract with Penn Ship for T-AOs 191 and 192 was terminated before the ships were complete. A new contract was executed with Tampa Shipyards, Inc., of Tampa FL, a division of the American Ship Building Company. This company should not be confused with Tampa Shipbuilding Company, (TASCO), which was a totally different entity, at a different location, long gone by 1989.

Disputes over corrective construction and materials costs between the U.S. Navy and Tampa Shipyards resulted in termination of this contract in 1993, when T-AO 191 was said to be 95% complete and T-AO 192 84% complete. The Navy then determined that the ships were no longer needed as oilers, and undertook a study of the feasibility of converting them to ammunition ships. This study concluded that such a conversion was cost-prohibitive and the ships were placed in long-term storage in an incomplete condition. They were sold for recycling in 2011.

== Naming ==
The class is named for its lead unit, Henry J. Kaiser, which is named for the American industrialist and shipbuilder Henry J. Kaiser (1882–1967). The first nine ships were named for American shipbuilders, inventors, naval architects, and aeronautical engineers who played important roles in the history of the U.S. Navy. The tenth to eighteenth ships were named after American rivers, which is a more traditional naming convention for U.S. Navy oilers.

== Operations ==
In U.S. Navy service, the ships serve in a non-commissioned status in the Military Sealift Command, with primarily civilian crews, and as such, they are prefixed as "USNS" instead of "USS", as commissioned ships are. After joining the fleet, the 16 completed ships all saw active service between 1986 and 1996, when Andrew J. Higgins became the first unit of the class to be laid up. Since then, some of the others have also spent periods out of service in reserve or in a limited operational status.

== Foreign transfer ==
Andrew J. Higgins never re-entered U.S. service after being laid up in 1996. She was sold to Chile in 2009 and was commissioned into the Chilean Navy in 2010 as Almirante Montt.

== Ships ==
Photo	Ship	Hull No.	Status	Years active	NVR Page
USNS Henry J. Kaiser (T-AO-187)	Henry J. Kaiser	T-AO-187	Active - Proposed decommission 2027	1986–present	T-AO-187
USNS Joshua Humphreys (T-AO-188)	Joshua Humphreys	T-AO-188	Active - Proposed decommission 2026	1987–1996; 2005–2006; 2010–present	T-AO-188
USNS John Lenthall (T-AO-189)	John Lenthall	T-AO-189	Active - Proposed decommission 2023	1987–1996; 1998–present	T-AO-189
USNS Andrew J. Higgins (T-AO-190)	Andrew J. Higgins	T-AO-190	Inactivated May 1996. Sold to the Chilean Navy May 2009. Towed to Atlantic Marine Alabama shipyard, Mobile, Alabama, September 2009 for three-month refit. Commissioned in Chilean Navy on 10 February 2010 and renamed Almirante Montt.	1987-1996 (USA); 2010–present (Chile)	AO-190
USNS Benjamin Isherwood (T-AO-191)	Benjamin Isherwood	T-AO-191	Cancelled when 95.3% complete, transferred to the Maritime Administration, laid up in the James River Reserve Fleet, scrapped in 2011	Launched 1988, christened 1991, never in service	AO-191
USNS Henry Eckford (T-AO-192)	Henry Eckford	T-AO-192	Cancelled when 84% complete, transferred to the Maritime Administration, laid up in the James River Reserve Fleet, scrapped in 2011	Launched 1989, never in service	AO-192
USNS Walter S. Diehl (T-AO-193)	Walter S. Diehl	T-AO-193	Decommissioned 1 October 2022	1988–2022	AO-193
USNS John Ericsson (T-AO-194)	John Ericsson	T-AO-194	Inactive	1991–2026	T-AO-194
USNS Leroy Grumman (T-AO-195)	Leroy Grumman	T-AO-195	Active - Proposed decommission 2025	1989–present	T-AO-195
USNS Kanawha (T-AO-196)	Kanawha	T-AO-196	Active	1991–present	T-AO-196
USNS Pecos (T-AO-197)	Pecos	T-AO-197	Inactive	1990–2026	T-AO-197
USNS Big Horn (T-AO-198)	Big Horn	T-AO-198	Ran aground September 2024, currently inactive	1992–2026	T-AO-198
USNS Tippecanoe (T-AO-199)	Tippecanoe	T-AO-199	Active	1993–present	T-AO-199
USNS Guadalupe (T-AO-200)	Guadalupe	T-AO-200	Active	1992–present	T-AO-200
USNS Patuxent (T-AO-201)	Patuxent	T-AO-201	Active	1995–present	T-AO-201
USNS Yukon (T-AO-202)	Yukon	T-AO-202	Active	1994–present	T-AO-202
USNS Laramie (T-AO-203)	Laramie	T-AO-203	Active	1996–present	T-AO-203
USNS Rappahannock (T-AO-204)	Rappahannock	T-AO-204	Active	1995–present	T-AO-204
