= USNS Yukon (T-AO-202) =

Oiler of the United States Navy

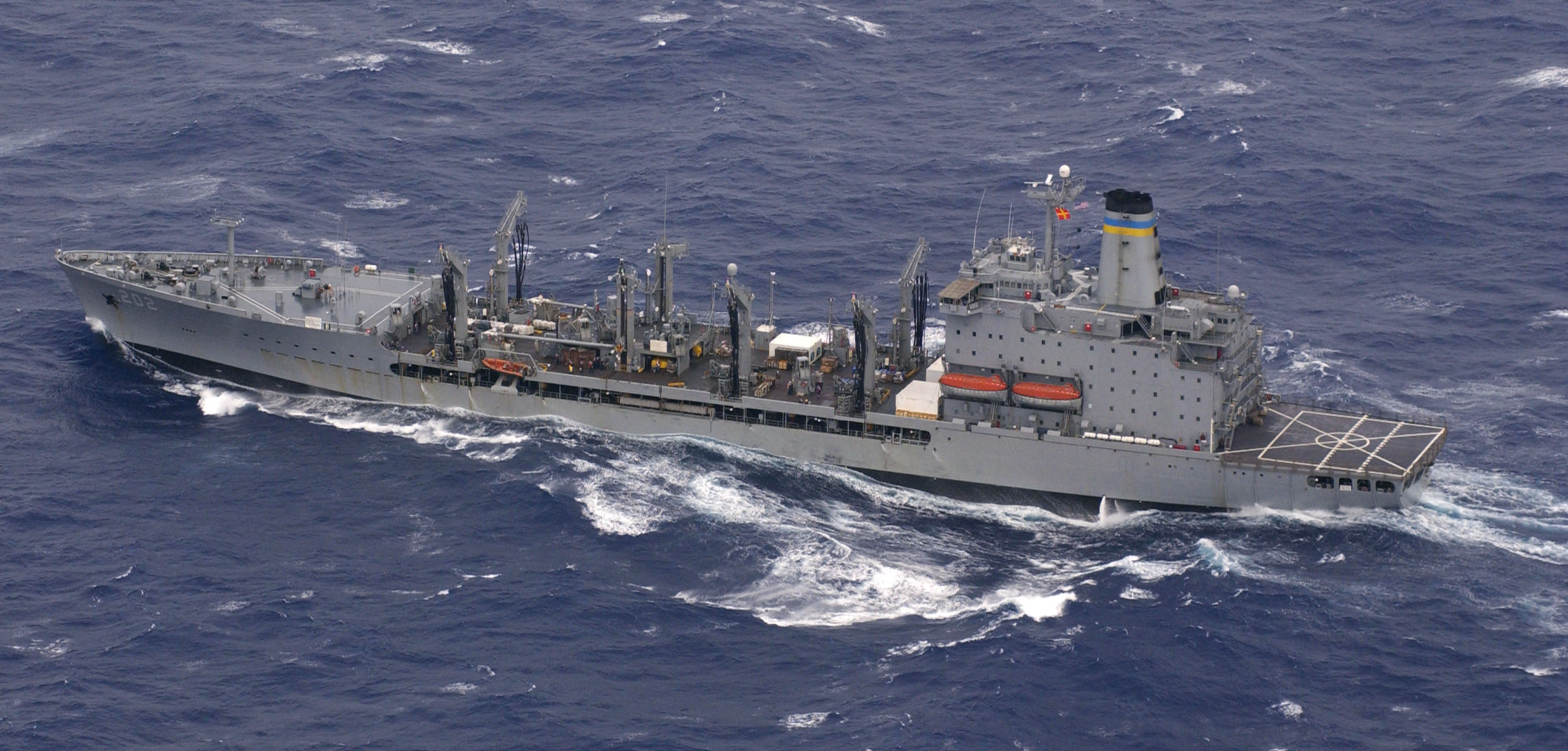
- USNS Yukon in the Pacific Ocean

History

United States
- Name: USNS Yukon
- Namesake: The Yukon River in Alaska
- Ordered: 6 October 1988
- Builder: Avondale Shipyard, Inc., New Orleans, Louisiana
- Laid down: 13 May 1991
- Launched: 6 February 1993
- In service: 25 March 1994–present
- Identification: IMO number: 8822454; MMSI number: 367218000; Callsign: NYUK
- Status: In active Military Sealift Command service

General characteristics
- Class & type: Henry J. Kaiser-class replenishment oiler
- Type: Fleet replenishment oiler
- Tonnage: 31,200 DWT
- Displacement: 9,500 tons light; Full load variously reported as 42,382 tons and 40,700 long tons (41,353 metric tons)
- Length: 677 ft (206 m)
- Beam: 97 ft 5 in (29.69 m)
- Draft: 35 ft (11 m) maximum
- Installed power: 16,000 hp (11.9 MW) per shaft; 34,442 hp (25.7 MW) total sustained
- Propulsion: Two medium-speed Colt-Pielstick PC4-2/2 10V-570 diesel engines, two shafts, controllable-pitch propellers
- Speed: 20 knots (37 km/h; 23 mph)
- Capacity: 178,000 to 180,000 barrels (28,300 to 28,600 m^{3}) of fuel oil and jet fuel; 7,400 square feet dry cargo space; eight 20-foot (6.1 m) refrigerated container with room for 128 pallets
- Complement: 103 (18 civilian officers, 1 U.S. Navy officer, 64 merchant seamen, 20 U.S. Navy enlisted personnel); Also given as 89 civilian and 3 U.S. Navy personnel
- Armament: Peacetime: usually none; Wartime: probably 2 x 20 mm Phalanx CIWS
- Aircraft carried: None
- Aviation facilities: Helicopter landing platform
- Notes: Five refueling stations; Two dry cargo transfer rigs

USNS Yukon (T-AO-202) is a Henry J. Kaiser-class underway replenishment oiler operated by the Military Sealift Command to support ships of the United States Navy.

== Background ==
Yukon, the 16th ship of the Henry J. Kaiser class, was laid down at Avondale Shipyard, Inc., at New Orleans, Louisiana, on 13 May 1991 and launched on 6 February 1993. She entered non-commissioned U.S. Navy service under the control of the Military Sealift Command with a primarily civilian crew on 25 March 1994. She serves in the United States Pacific Fleet.

== Operational history ==
On 27 February 2000, Yukon collided with a smaller civilian cargo ship while entering the port of Dubai in the Persian Gulf.

On 13 July 2000, Yukon collided with the amphibious transport dock USS Denver (LPD-9) during an underway replenishment about 180 nautical miles (330 km) west of Hawaii. No one on either ship was injured, and there were no fuel leaks, but Yukon suffered major damage, including several large holes and dents above the water line on her starboard quarter, while a 40-foot (12.2 m) hole was torn in Denver's bow from the second deck to the waterline. The investigation into the accident found Denver responsible. Both ships went to the Pearl Harbor Naval Shipyard at Pearl Harbor, Hawaii, for repairs. Yukon then transited to San Francisco, California, for further repairs at the same time as her scheduled routine overhaul. Yukon returned to service in January 2001.

On 16 May 2012, Yukon collided with the amphibious assault ship USS Essex (LHD-2) after Essex suffered an apparent steering malfunction upon approach for an underway replenishment. There were no injuries and no loss of fuel was reported. Both vessels were able to continue to San Diego, California, under their own power. The crew of the USS Essex was blamed in a report.
