= USNS John Lenthall =

Oiler of the United States Navy

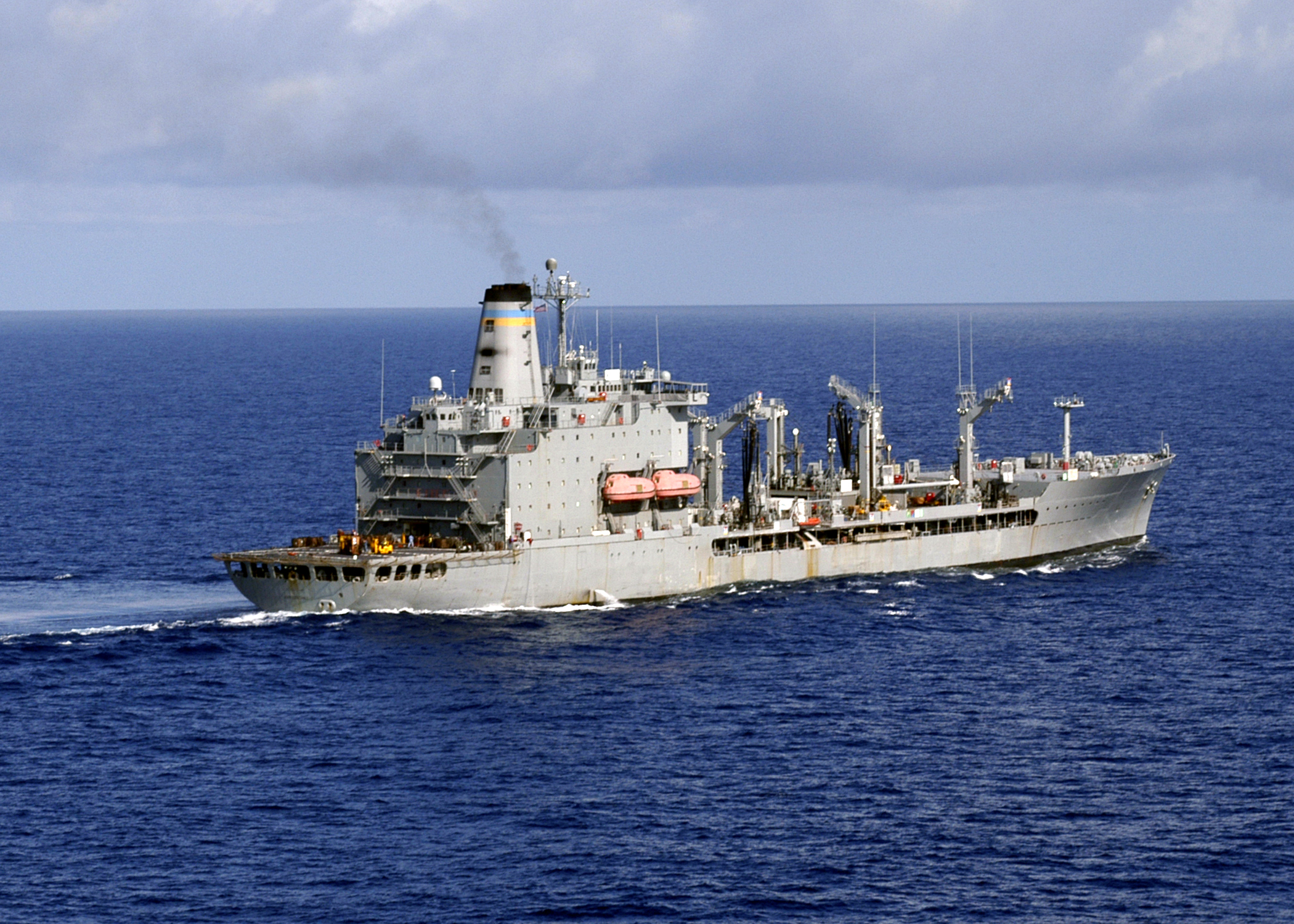
- USNS John Lenthall (T-AO-189)

History

United States
- Namesake: John Lenthall (1807-1882), an American naval architect and shipbuilder
- Ordered: 22 November 1983
- Builder: Avondale Shipyard, Inc., New Orleans, Louisiana
- Laid down: 15 July 1985
- Launched: 9 August 1986
- In service: 25 July 1987 – 11 November 1996 and 7 December 1998 – present
- Out of service: 11 November 1996 – 7 December 1998
- Identification: IMO number: 8325547; MMSI number: 367932000; Callsign: NJLN
- Status: Active service in Military Sealift Command

General characteristics
- Class & type: Henry J. Kaiser-class replenishment oiler
- Type: Fleet replenishment oiler
- Tonnage: 31,200 deadweight tons
- Displacement: 9,500 tons light; Full load variously reported as 42,382 tons and 40,700 long tons (41,353 metric tons)
- Length: 677 ft (206 m)
- Beam: 97 ft 5 in (29.69 m)
- Draft: 35 ft (11 m) maximum
- Installed power: 16,000 hp (11.9 MW) per shaft; 34,442 hp (25.7 MW) total sustained
- Propulsion: Two medium-speed Colt-Pielstick PC4-2/2 10V-570 diesel engines, two shafts, controllable-pitch propellers
- Speed: 20 knots (37 km/h; 23 mph)
- Capacity: 178,000 to 180,000 barrels (28,300 to 28,600 m^{3}) of fuel oil and jet fuel; 7,400 sq ft (690 m^{2}) dry cargo space; eight 20-foot (6.1 m) refrigerated containers with room for 128 pallets
- Complement: 103 (18 civilian officers, 1 U.S. Navy officer, 64 merchant seamen, 20 U.S. Navy enlisted personnel)
- Armament: Peacetime: none, although does have numerous mounts and arms for .50cal weapons.; Wartime: probably 2 x 20-mm Phalanx CIWS
- Aircraft carried: None
- Aviation facilities: Helicopter landing platform
- Notes: Five refueling stations; Two dry cargo transfer rigs

USNS John Lenthall (T-AO-189) is a Henry J. Kaiser-class replenishment oiler of the United States Navy. Her motto is "Shaft of the Spear".

== Construction and delivery ==
John Lenthall, the third ship of the Henry J. Kaiser class, was laid down at Avondale Shipyard, Inc., at New Orleans, Louisiana, on 15 July 1985 and launched on 9 August 1986. The ship entered non-commissioned U.S. Navy service with a primarily civilian crew on 25 July 1987.

== Service history ==
John Lenthall served in the United States Atlantic Fleet under MSC control until taken out of active service on 11 November 1996 and placed in reserve.

John Lenthall was reactivated on 7 December 1998, and is in active service in the Atlantic Fleet.

On 17 April 2004, a merchant ship lost steering control while departing Valletta, Malta, and collided with another ship before striking John Lenthall broadside while she was pierside undergoing maintenance. No one aboard John Lenthall suffered injuries, and she sustained only limited damage to outside structures and equipment.

On 23 September 2008, John Lenthall was shadowed by suspected pirates. They fled after she fired several warning shots in their vicinity.

On 9 March 2021, John Lenthall replenished Italian aircraft carrier Cavour in the Western Atlantic Ocean.

== Images ==
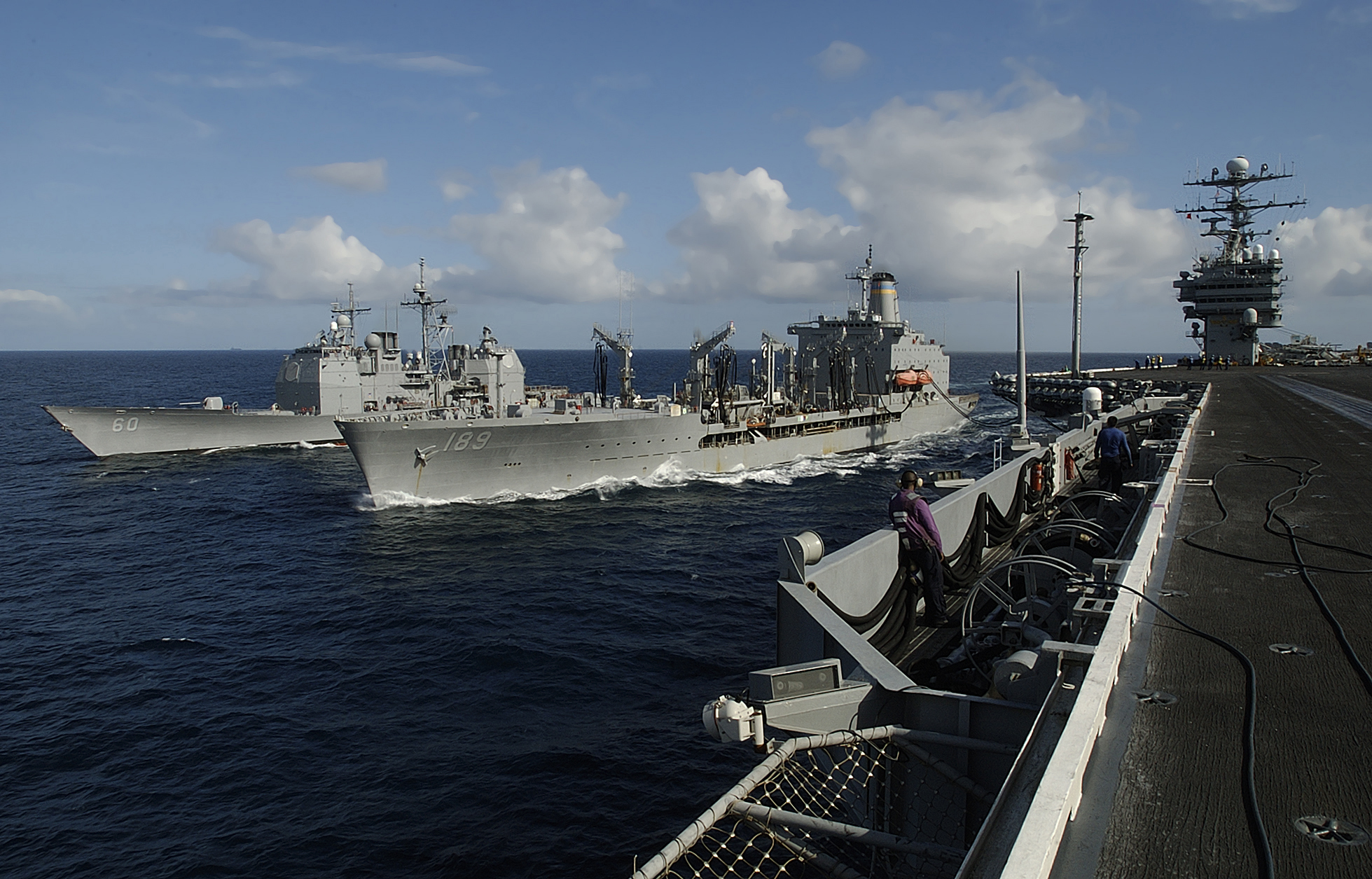
John Lenthall next to the cruiser Normandy, 22 June 2002

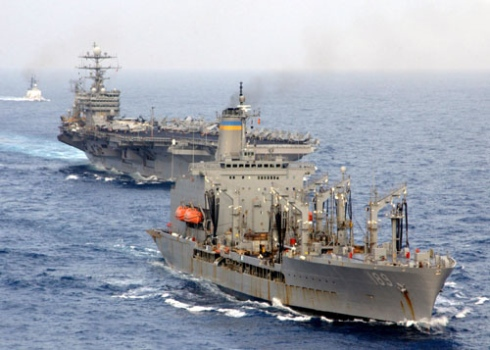
John Lenthall, right foreground, prepares to refuel the aircraft carrier USS Harry S. Truman, aft left, in the Mediterranean Sea.

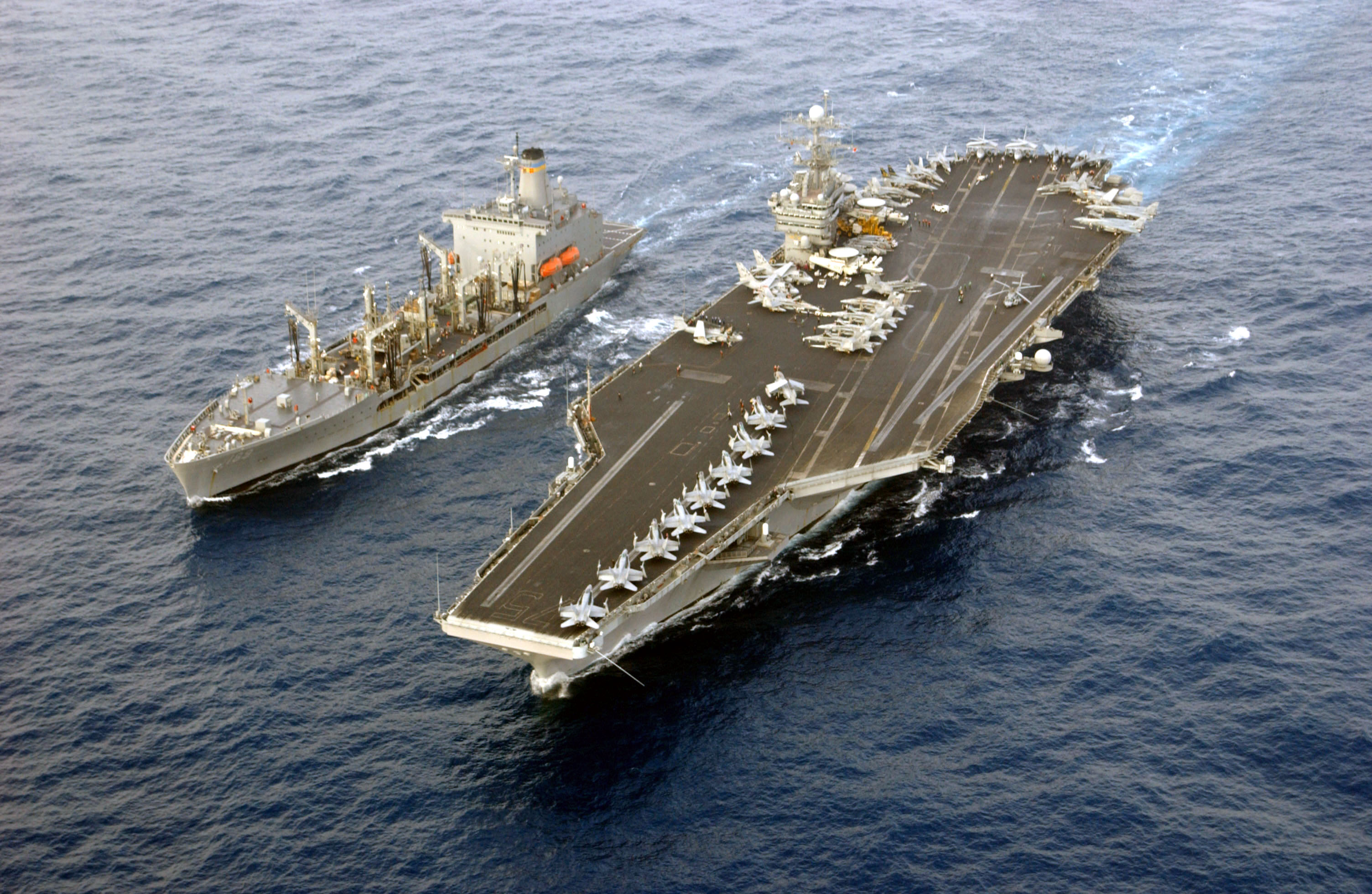
The aircraft carrier USS Harry S. Truman comes alongside John Lenthall for refueling on 3 April 2003.

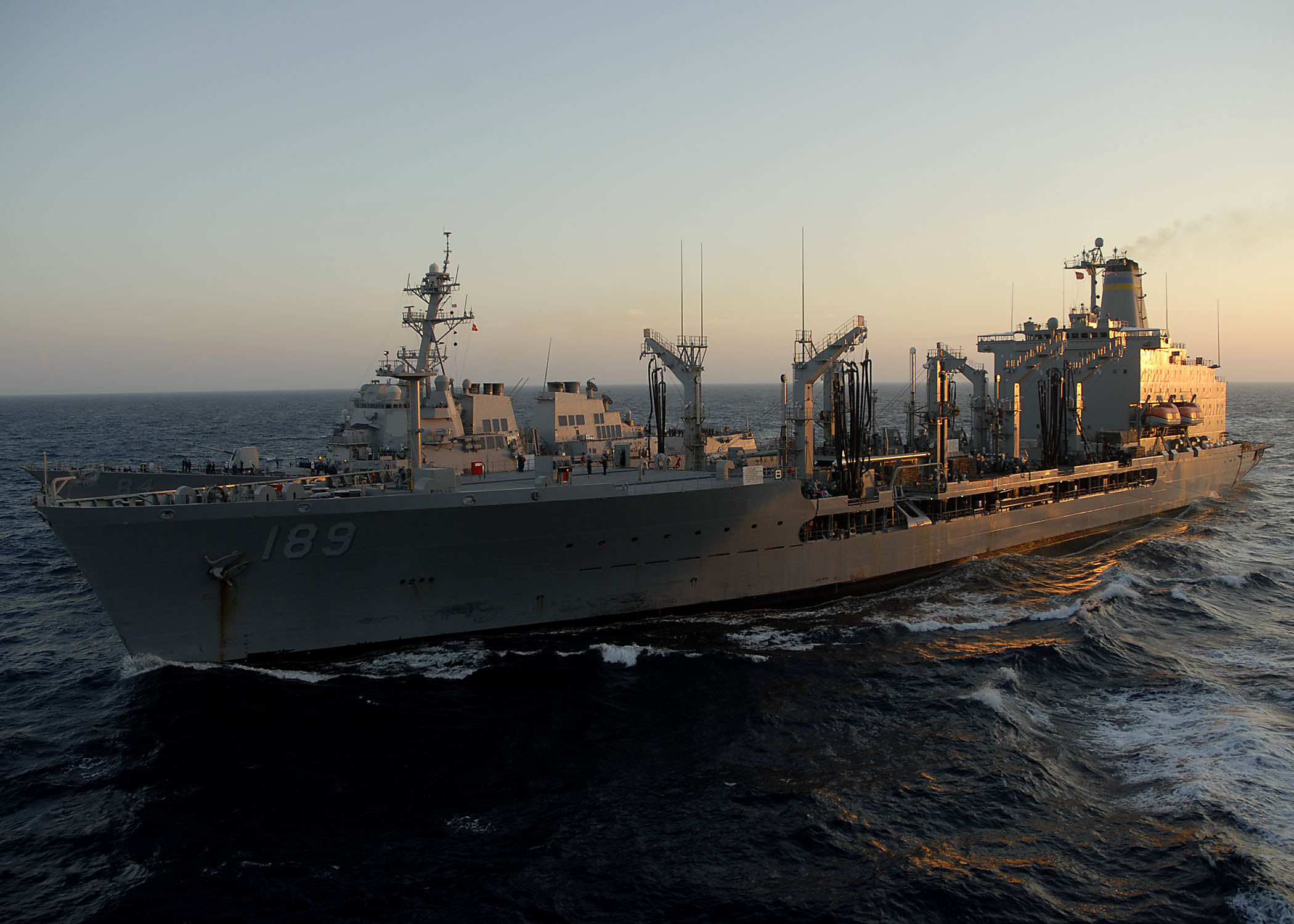
John Lenthall steams alongside the destroyer Bulkeley
