= USNS Leroy Grumman =

Henry J. Kaiser-class fleet replenishment oiler of the US Navy

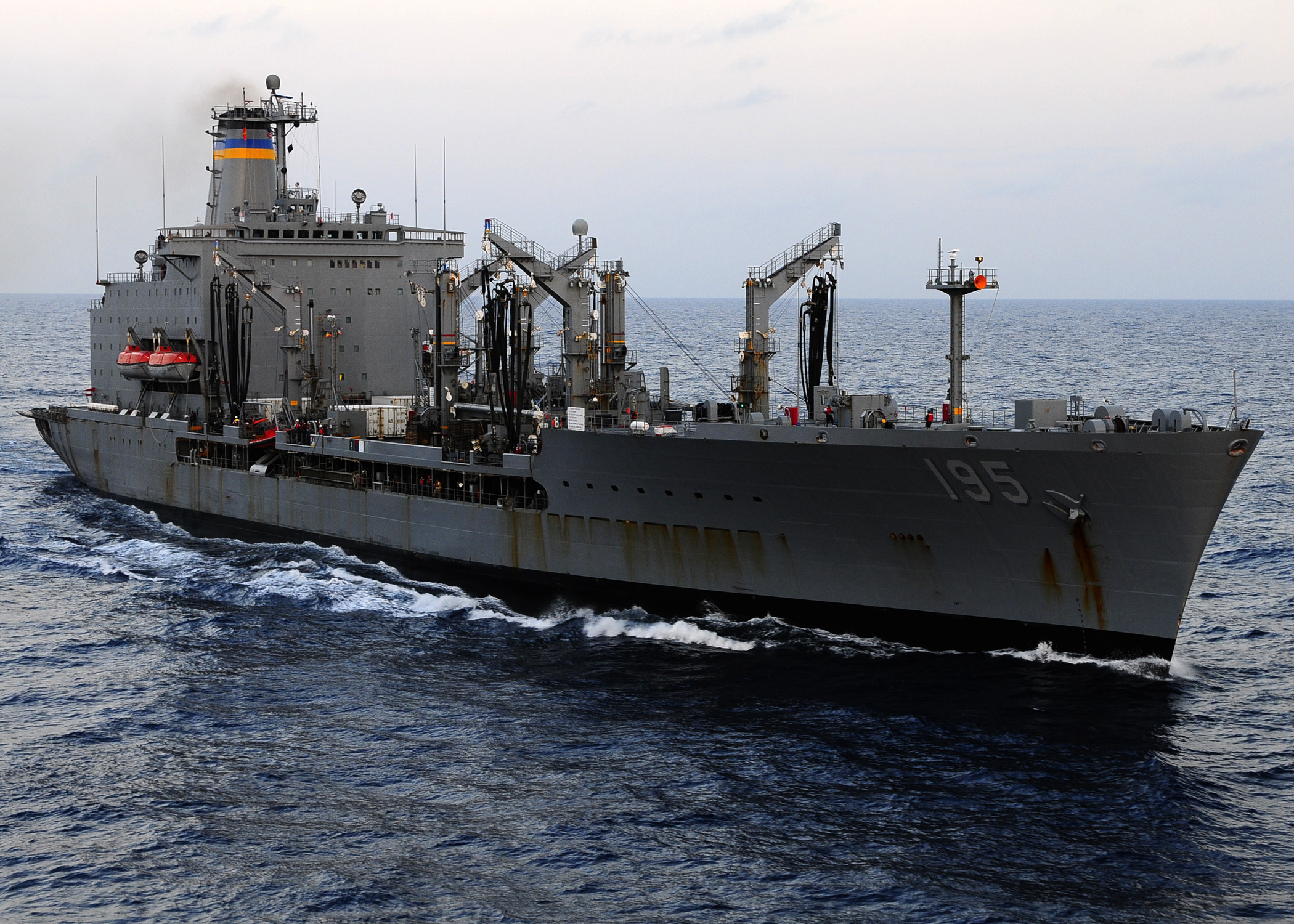
- USNS Leroy Grumman (T-AO-195)

History

United States
- Name: USNS Leroy Grumman
- Namesake: Leroy Grumman (1895–1982), an American industrialist and aeronautical engineer
- Ordered: 27 February 1986
- Builder: Avondale Shipyard, Inc., New Orleans, Louisiana
- Laid down: 6 July 1987
- Launched: 3 December 1988
- In service: 23 August 1989-present
- Identification: IMO number: 8511500; MMSI number: 367866000; Callsign: NNLG
- Status: In active service

General characteristics
- Class & type: Henry J. Kaiser-class replenishment oiler
- Tonnage: 31,200 DWT
- Displacement: 9,500 tons light; Full load variously reported as 42,382 tons and 40,700 long tons (41,353 metric tons)
- Length: 677 ft (206 m)
- Beam: 97 ft 5 in (29.69 m)
- Draft: 35 ft (11 m) maximum
- Installed power: 16,000 hp (12,000 kW) per shaft; 34,442 hp (25,683 kW) total sustained
- Propulsion: Two medium-speed Colt-Pielstick PC4-2/2 10V-570 diesel engines, two shafts, controllable-pitch propellers
- Speed: 20 knots (37 km/h; 23 mph)
- Capacity: 178,000–180,000 barrels (28,300–28,600 m^{3}) of fuel oil and jet fuel; 7,400 ft^{2} (690 m^{2}) dry cargo space; eight 20-foot (6.1 m) refrigerated containers with room for 128 pallets
- Complement: 103 (18 civilian officers, 1 U.S. Navy officer, 64 merchant seamen, 20 U.S. Navy enlisted personnel)
- Aviation facilities: Helicopter landing platform
- Notes: Five refueling stations; Two dry cargo transfer rigs

USNS Leroy Grumman (T-AO-195) is a Henry J. Kaiser-class replenishment oiler of the United States Navy.

== Design ==
The Henry J. Kaiser-class replenishment oilers were preceded by the shorter Cimarron-class fleet replenishment oilers. Leroy Grumman has an overall length of 206.5 metres (677 ft 6 in). It has a beam of 29.7 metres (97 ft) and a draft of 11 metres (36 ft). The oiler has a displacement of 41,353 tonnes (40,700 long tons; 45,584 short tons) at full load. It has a capacity of 180,000 imperial barrels (29,000,000 L; 6,500,000 imp gal; 7,800,000 US gal) of aviation fuel or fuel oil. It can carry a dry load of 690 square metres (7,400 sq ft) and can refrigerate 128 pallets of food. The ship is powered by two 10 PC4.2 V 570 Colt-Pielstick diesel engines that drive two shafts; this gives a power of 25.6 megawatts (34,800 PS; 34,300 shp).

The Henry J. Kaiser-class oilers have maximum speeds of 20 knots (37 km/h; 23 mph). They were built without armaments but can be fitted with close-in weapon systems. The ship has a helicopter platform but not any maintenance facilities. It is fitted with five fuelling stations; these can fill two ships at the same time and the ship is capable of pumping 900,000 US gallons (3,400,000 L; 750,000 imp gal) of diesel or 540,000 US gallons (2,000,000 L; 450,000 imp gal) of jet fuel per hour. It has a complement of eighty-nine civilians (nineteen officers), twenty-nine spare crew, and six United States Navy crew.

== Construction and delivery ==
Leroy Grumman, the ninth ship of the Henry J. Kaiser class and first U.S. Navy ship to bear the name, was laid down at Avondale Shipyard, Inc., at New Orleans, Louisiana, on 6 July 1987 and launched on 3 December 1988. She entered non-commissioned U.S. Navy service under the control of the Military Sealift Command with a primarily civilian crew on 3 August 1989.

== Service history ==
Leroy Grumman serves in the United States Atlantic Fleet.

In early 2012, she joined several British warships from the Royal Navy including the aircraft carrier HMS Illustrious and fleet flagship HMS Bulwark to partake in Exercise Joint Warrior and other training missions with warships from the United Kingdom, Norway and the Netherlands.

Leroy Grumman docked in Boston in January 2020 for scheduled maintenance by Boston Ship Repair, slated to go until the end of May.

== Incidents ==
During the coronavirus pandemic, on 30 April 2020, USNI News reported that two civilian mariners on Leroy Grumman had been infected with SARS-CoV-2. By 5 May, 18 sailors had tested positive, including the ship's medic. About 50 people were on board and all were placed under quarantine. The source of the infection was unclear, but a spokesperson for Military Sealift Command stated that there were outside contractors at the shipyard who had tested positive earlier.

On 19 May 2020, the Project On Government Oversight and The Daily Beast reported that 22 crew members and 30 contractors had tested positive for the virus, and that a 60-year-old contractor who worked in the engine room had died of the virus. In addition, it was reported that mariners had complained about how MSC was "being reactive rather than proactive," and that, despite the issuance of a gangway up order that required all civilian mariners on leave to return to the ship and prevented all mariners from leaving the ship, contractors and other personnel were allowed to embark and disembark with virtually no restrictions, except for random temperature checks and a self-report questionnaire. The ship was eventually vacated on 8 May 2020 for seven days.

On 21 May, a civilian mariner was declared dead due to complications of the virus. (Note: One source reported that the mariner died on 22 May, while the Navy stated that the mariner was "pronounced deceased" on 21 May, but first reported it on its page for coronavirus updates on 22 May.) He was hospitalized on 30 April, and was placed on a ventilator in an ICU on 4 May. The deceased was the first civilian mariner to die of the virus on an MSC ship.
