= USNS Laramie =

Oiler of the United States Navy

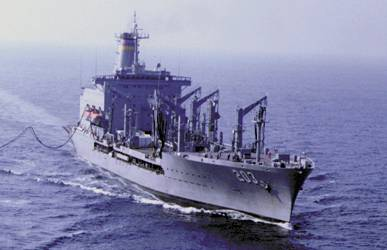
- USNS Laramie (T-AO-203)

History

United States
- Name: USNS Laramie
- Namesake: The Laramie River in Colorado and Wyoming
- Ordered: 24 March 1989
- Builder: Avondale Shipyard, Inc., New Orleans, Louisiana
- Laid down: 10 January 1994
- Launched: 6 May 1995
- In service: 7 May 1996-present
- Identification: IMO number: 8906626; MMSI number: 367861000; Callsign: NLAR
- Status: In active Military Sealift Command service

General characteristics
- Class & type: Henry J. Kaiser-class replenishment oiler
- Type: Fleet replenishment oiler
- Tonnage: 31,200 DWT
- Displacement: 9,500 tons light; 42,000 long tons (42,674 metric tons) full load
- Length: 677 ft (206 m)
- Beam: 97 ft 5 in (29.69 m)
- Draft: 35 ft (11 m) maximum
- Installed power: 16,000 hp (11.9 MW) per shaft; 34,442 hp (25.7 MW) total sustained
- Propulsion: Two medium-speed Colt-Pielstick PC4-2/2 10V-570 diesel engines, two shafts, controllable-pitch propellers
- Speed: 20 knots (37 km/h; 23 mph)
- Capacity: 159,000 barrels (25,300 m^{3}) of fuel oil and jet fuel; 7,400 square feet dry cargo space; eight 20-foot (6.1 m) refrigerated containers with room for 128 pallets
- Complement: 103 (18 civilian officers, 1 U.S. Navy officer, 64 merchant seamen, 20 U.S. Navy enlisted personnel)
- Armament: Peacetime: usually none; Wartime: probably 2 x 20-mm Phalanx CIWS
- Aircraft carried: None
- Aviation facilities: Helicopter landing platform
- Notes: Five refueling stations; Two dry cargo transfer rigs

USNS Laramie (T-AO-203) is a Henry J. Kaiser-class underway replenishment oiler operated by the Military Sealift Command to support ships of the United States Navy.

Laramie, the seventeenth ship of the Henry J. Kaiser class, was laid down at Avondale Shipyard, Inc., at New Orleans, Louisiana, on 10 January 1994 and launched on 6 May 1995. She was one of only three of the eighteen Henry J. Kaiser-class ships—the other two being USNS Patuxent (T-AO-201) and USNS Rappahannock (T-AO-204)—to be built with a double bottom in order to meet the requirements of the Oil Pollution Act of 1990. Hull separation is 6 feet (1.8 m) at the sides and 6 feet 6 inches (1.98 m) on the bottom, reducing her liquid cargo capacity by about 21,000 barrels (3,300 m^{3}) from that of the 15 ships of her class without a double bottom.

Laramie entered non-commissioned U.S. Navy service under the control of the Military Sealift Command with a primarily civilian crew on 7 May 1996, the last of the eighteen Henry J. Kaiser-class ships to enter service. She serves in the United States Atlantic Fleet.

== Design ==
The Henry J. Kaiser-class replenishment oilers were preceded by the shorter Cimarron class. Laramie has an overall length of 206.5 metres (677 ft 6 in). It has a beam of 29.7 metres (97 ft) and a draft of 11 metres (36 ft). The oiler has a displacement of 41,353 tonnes (40,700 long tons; 45,584 short tons) at full load. It has a capacity of 159,000 imperial barrels (26,000,000 L; 5,700,000 imp gal; 6,900,000 US gal) of aviation fuel or fuel oil. It can carry a dry load of 690 square metres (7,400 sq ft) and can refrigerate 128 pallets of food. The ship is powered by two 10 PC4.2 V 570 Colt-Pielstick diesel engines that drive two shafts; this gives a power of 25.6 megawatts (34,800 PS; 34,300 shp).

The Henry J. Kaiser-class oilers have maximum speeds of 20 knots (37 km/h; 23 mph). They were built without armaments but can be fitted with close-in weapon systems. The ship has a helicopter platform but not any maintenance facilities. It is fitted with five fuelling stations; these can fill two ships at the same time and the ship is capable of pumping 900,000 US gallons (3,400,000 L; 750,000 imp gal) of diesel or 540,000 US gallons (2,000,000 L; 450,000 imp gal) of jet fuel per hour. It has a complement of eighty-nine civilians (nineteen officers), twenty-nine spare crew, and six United States Navy crew.

== Bibliography ==
- Russell, Robert J. (1997). "Re: USNS Laramie (T-AO-203)". Warship International. XXXIIII (4): 331. ISSN 0043-0374.
