= USNS Rappahannock =

Oiler of the United States Navy

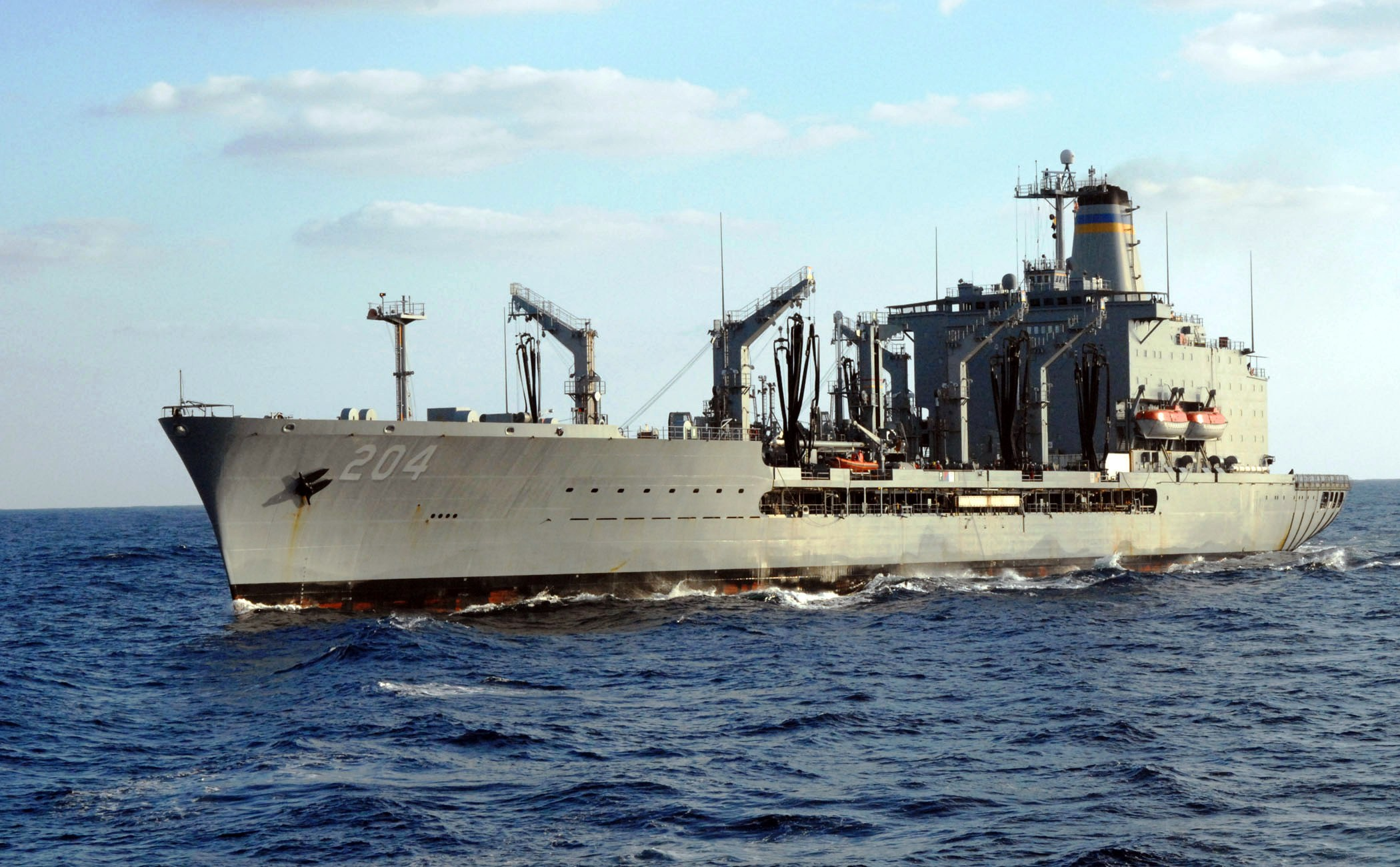
- Rappahannock maneuvering into port at Pearl Harbor; April 2005

History

United States
- Name: USNS Rappahannock
- Namesake: Rappahannock River
- Ordered: 6 October 1988
- Builder: Avondale Shipyard, Inc., New Orleans, Louisiana
- Laid down: 29 March 1992
- Launched: 14 January 1995
- In service: 7 November 1995
- Identification: IMO number: 8822466; MMSI number: 367867000; Callsign: NRAP
- Motto: RAS & ROLL!
- Status: In active service

General characteristics
- Class & type: Henry J. Kaiser-class replenishment oiler
- Type: Fleet replenishment oiler
- Tonnage: 27,571 deadweight tons
- Displacement: 15,968 long tons light; 42,383 long tons (43,063 metric tons) full load
- Length: 677 ft 6 in (206.50 m)
- Beam: 97 ft 5 in (29.69 m)
- Draft: 36 ft (11 m) maximum
- Installed power: 16,000 hp (11.9 MW) per shaft; 34,442 hp (25.7 MW) total sustained
- Propulsion: Two medium-speed Colt-Pielstick PC4-2/2 10V-570 diesel engines, two shafts, controllable-pitch propellers
- Speed: 20 knots (37 km/h; 23 mph)
- Capacity: 159,000 barrels (25,300 m^{3}) of fuel oil and jet fuel; 7,400 sq ft (690 m^{2}) dry cargo space; eight 20-foot (6.1 m) refrigerated containers with room for 128 pallets
- Complement: 89 Civilian Mariners (CIVMARS), 20 Licensed Officers, 69 Unlicensed Crew, Supplement 12 Person MILDET Embarked Security Team
- Armament: Peacetime: small arms; Wartime: small arms, crew serve weapons including .50-caliber machine guns
- Aviation facilities: Helicopter landing platform
- Notes: Five refueling stations 1,2,6,7,8; Three fuel receiving stations 1A,5A,7A; Two dry cargo transfer rigs stations 3,4

USNS Rappahannock is a Henry J. Kaiser-class underway replenishment oiler operated by the Military Sealift Command to support ships of the United States Navy.

== Construction and delivery ==
Rappahannock, the eighteenth ship and final ship of the Henry J. Kaiser class and the second U.S. Navy ship named for the Rappahannock River in Virginia, was laid down at Avondale Shipyard, Inc., at New Orleans, Louisiana, on 29 March 1992 and launched on 14 January 1995. She was one of only three of the eighteen Henry J. Kaiser-class ships – the other two being Patuxent and Laramie – to be built with a double bottom in order to meet the requirements of the Oil Pollution Act of 1990. Hull separation is 6 feet (1.8 m) at the sides and 6 feet 6 inches (1.98 m) on the bottom, reducing her liquid cargo capacity by about 21,000 barrels (3,300 m^{3}) from that of the 15 ships of her class without a double bottom.

Rappahannock entered non-commissioned U.S. Navy service under the control of Military Sealift Command with a primarily civilian crew on 7 November 1995.

== Service history ==
Rappahannock serves in the United States Pacific Fleet.

During Operation Tomodachi, Rappahannock delivered fuel, stores and humanitarian relief supplies to Blue Ridge for transport to mainland Japan. Rappahannock then loaded diesel and aviation fuel at Sasebo, Japan, on 24 March before sailing for Gwangyang, South Korea, arriving 27 March. There, Rappahannock loaded 289 pallets of bottled water, which the ship delivered to Yokosuka, Japan, 30 March. Less than 24 hours later, the ship was underway again in the direction of Sendai. Rappahannock completed 10 underway replenishment missions delivering more than 2.4 million gallons of fuel.

On 16 July 2012, the Rappahannock was involved in an incident in the Persian Gulf off the coast of Dubai with an Indian fishing boat. The US Navy Fifth Fleet said that the boat approached the ship despite several warnings, although this was disputed by those on board the boat. "An embarked security team aboard a U.S. Navy vessel fired upon a small motor vessel after it disregarded warnings and rapidly approached the U.S. ship," Lt. Greg Raelson, media officer for U.S. Navy, said in an e-mailed statement. According to the Navy's Central Command Public Affairs, the Navy vessel followed its force protocol by first attempting to warn away the approaching craft with a series of non-lethal procedures using voice, radio, and lights. After those failed the Rappahannock escalated to lethal force, firing on the approaching vessel with a .50-caliber machine gun, killing an Indian fisherman on board and wounding three others.

On 16 October 2019, the Rappahannock conducted a replenishment-at-sea for the amphibious assault ship USS Boxer (LHD-4) in the South China Sea.
