= Fairbanks Morse Defense =

American engine manufacturer

Fairbanks Morse Defense, a subsidiary of Arcline Investment Management, is an American manufacturer of engines and other products. Established in 2020, it is one of three separate corporate entities that can trace its roots to Fairbanks-Morse, an American manufacturing company that operated independently from 1823 to 1958. The company's structure includes Fairbanks Morse Services, Fairbanks Morse Technology, and FMD's Strategic Collaborators.

The company has supplied marine technologies, engines, details, and more to the U.S. Navy, U.S. Coast Guard, Military Sealift Command, and Canadian Coast Guard. As of 2024, Fairbanks Morse Defense products power more than 80% of the United States Navy ships with medium-speed engines.

== History ==
The company derives from Thaddeus Fairbanks' 1823 founding of an ironworks in St. Johnsbury, Vermont. The company grew and operated independently until it was acquired by Penn-Texas Corporation in 1958. The conglomerate first renamed itself Fairbanks Whitney Corporation, then Colt Industries in 1964, taking the name from Colt Manufacturing, the maker of firearms and another asset of Penn-Texas. In 1990, Colt Industries sold its firearms business (to C.F. Holdings Corp as Colt's Manufacturing Company, Inc.) and became Coltec Industries. In 2002, Fairbanks Morse was spun off in a grouping named EnPro Industries, which on January 21, 2020, sold Fairbanks Morse to Arcline Investment Management.

Arcline named its new subsidiary Fairbanks Morse Defense, signaling its intention to pursue defense-sector sales.

In 2021, the company acquired Ward Leonard, Welin Lambie, and Hunt Valve, thus creating the Fairbanks Morse Defense family of brands. The expansion continued in 2022 with the addition of Federal Equipment Company, Maxim Watermakers, and Research Tool and Die (RT&D).

In October, Fairbanks Morse Defense acquired American Fan, and in 2024, the company purchased Massachusetts-based metalworking supplier Samtan Engineering Corporation.

In July 2025, the company acquired the Rolls-Royce Naval Propulsory business, including its Massachusetts and Ontario factories.
