= RIMPAC =

International maritime warfare exercise

Exercise RIMPAC
- Headquarters: Pearl Harbor, Hawaii, U.S
- Type: Military exercises
- Members: 26 participants (RIMPAC 2022): Australia; Brunei; Canada; Chile; Colombia; Denmark; Ecuador; France; Germany; India; Indonesia; Israel; Japan; South Korea; Malaysia; Mexico; Netherlands; New Zealand; Peru; Philippines; Singapore; Sri Lanka; Thailand; Tonga; United Kingdom; United States; 6 past participants: Brazil; China; Italy; Norway; Russia; Vietnam
- Establishment: 1971

The Rim of the Pacific Exercise (RIMPAC) is the world's largest international maritime warfare exercise. RIMPAC is held biennially during June and July of even-numbered years from Honolulu, Hawaii, with the exception of 2020, when it was held in August. It is hosted and administered by the Indo-Pacific Command, headquartered at Pearl Harbor, in conjunction with the Marine Corps, the Coast Guard, and Hawaii National Guard forces under the control of the governor of Hawaii.

== Participants ==
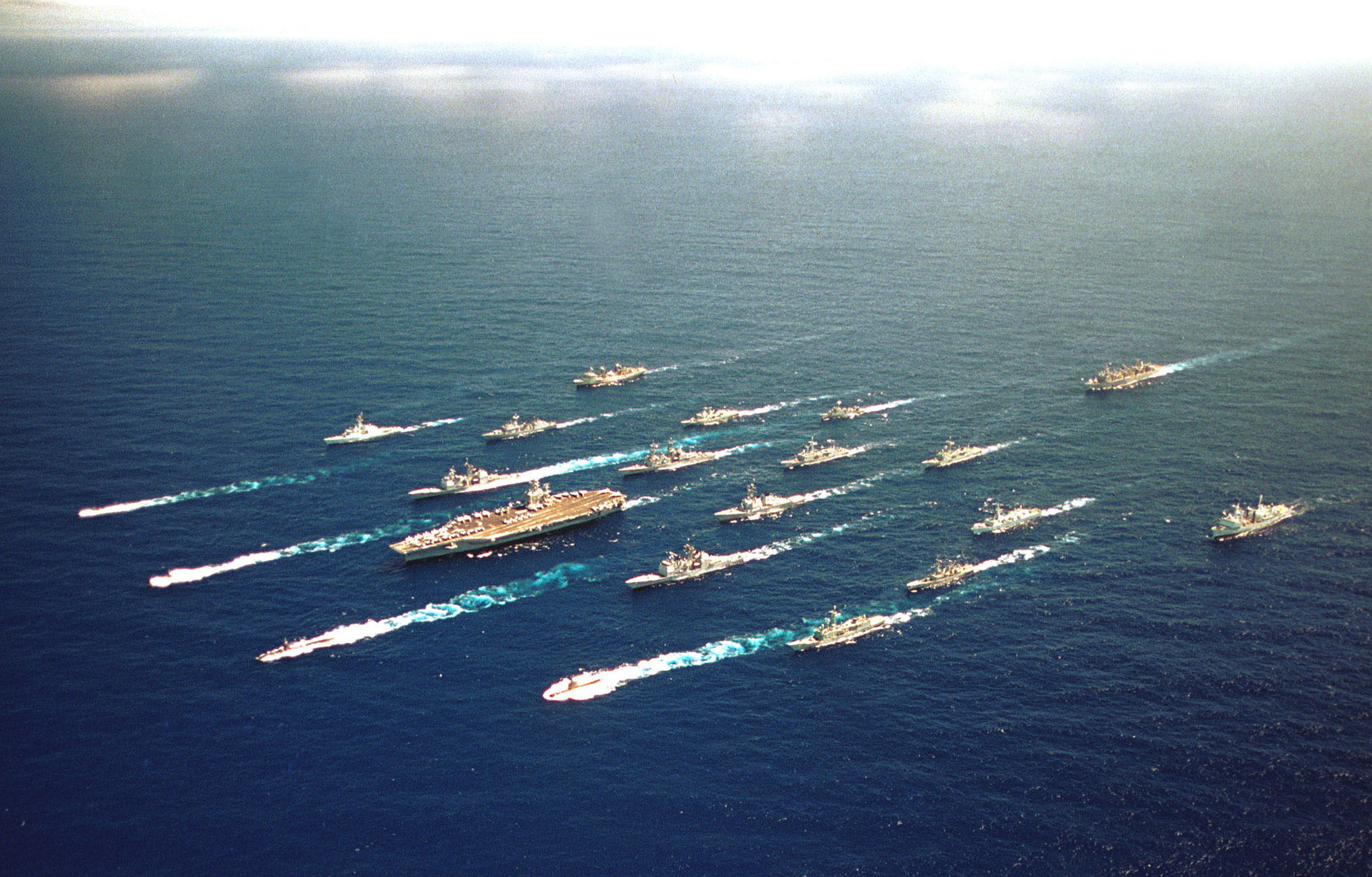
The USS Abraham Lincoln carrier battle group along with ships from Australia, Canada, Chile, Japan, and South Korea during RIMPAC 2000.

The first RIMPAC, held in 1971, involved forces from Australia, Canada, New Zealand, the United Kingdom (UK), and the United States (US). Australia, Canada, and the US have participated in every RIMPAC since then. Other regular participants are Chile, Colombia, France, India, Indonesia, Japan, Malaysia, the Netherlands, Peru, Philippines, Singapore, South Korea, and Thailand. The Royal New Zealand Navy was frequently involved until the 1985 ANZUS nuclear ships dispute and was subsequently absent, until returning to take part in more recent RIMPACs since 2012.

While not contributing any ships, observer nations are involved in RIMPAC at the strategic level and use the opportunity to prepare for possible full participation in the future. The United States contingent has included an aircraft carrier strike group, submarines, up to a hundred aircraft, and 20,000 Sailors, Marines, Coast Guardsmen, and their respective officers. The size of the exercises varies from year to year. In the National Defense Authorization Act for Fiscal Year 2022, both houses of the US Congress have called for a Taiwanese participation of RIMPAC 2022 in the face of "increasingly coercive and aggressive behavior" by China.

== By year ==
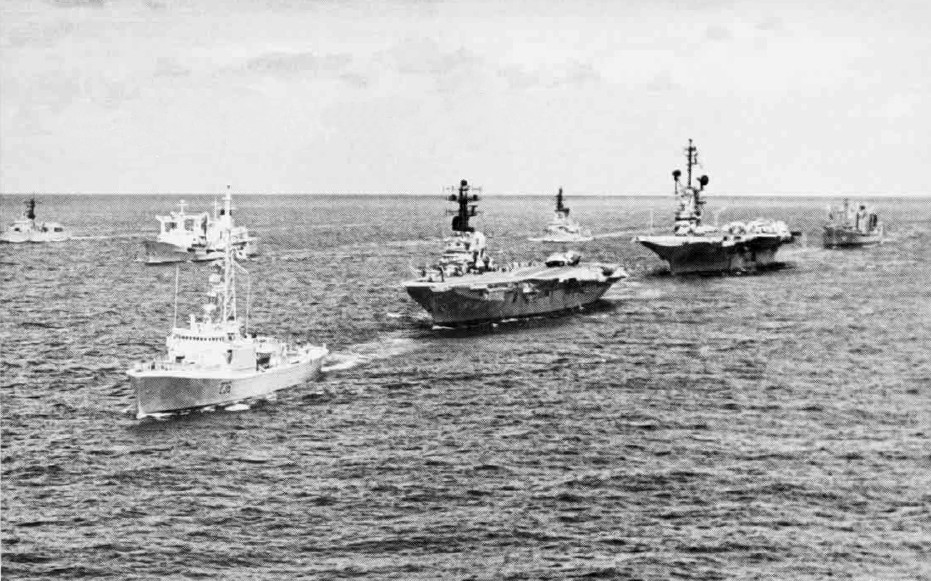
RIMPAC 1972 participants

As discussed previously, the first RIMPAC was in 1971.

=== RIMPAC 1988 ===
RIMPAC '88 took place in June 1988 and involved the navies of Japan, Australia, Canada, and the United States, as well as United States Air Force B-52s. Two US battle groups staged out of Pearl Harbor for the exercise: The USS Nimitz carrier battle group and the USS Missouri battleship battle group. Following routine training exercises to enhance the multinational forces' abilities to operate together, the two battle groups were split into opposing forces, and a pre-set war game scenario was put into action. The Missouri battle group, with USS Long Beach, HMAS Darwin, HMAS Hobart, and other escort and supply ships, assumed the role of "aggressor" and conducted an imaginary takeover of the friendly island of "Wombat", a fictitious name given to the island of Lanai, as part of the war game exercise. The USS Nimitz carrier battle group, accompanied by at least one submarine and Japanese and Canadian Navy frigates and destroyers, sortied from Pearl Harbor to "rescue" Wombat from the aggressor force.

Soviet intelligence "trawlers" constantly sailed the waters near the entrance of Pearl Harbor during the exercise, "fishing" for radio transmissions and trying to follow warships as they left the harbor. Thus, the US Navy would often sortie many more ships than those needed to participate in the exercise, enticing the trawlers to follow them to sea. After the participating ships left harbor, the decoy fleet would then lead the Soviet trawlers back to Pearl Harbor, leaving the Soviet captains wondering where the carriers and battleships had gone. The much larger carrier battle group eventually "won" the exercise, as was expected, and peace-loving "Wombat" was liberated. Testing and perfecting the joint interoperability of the various nations' navies was the ultimate goal. To this end, neither side "lost".

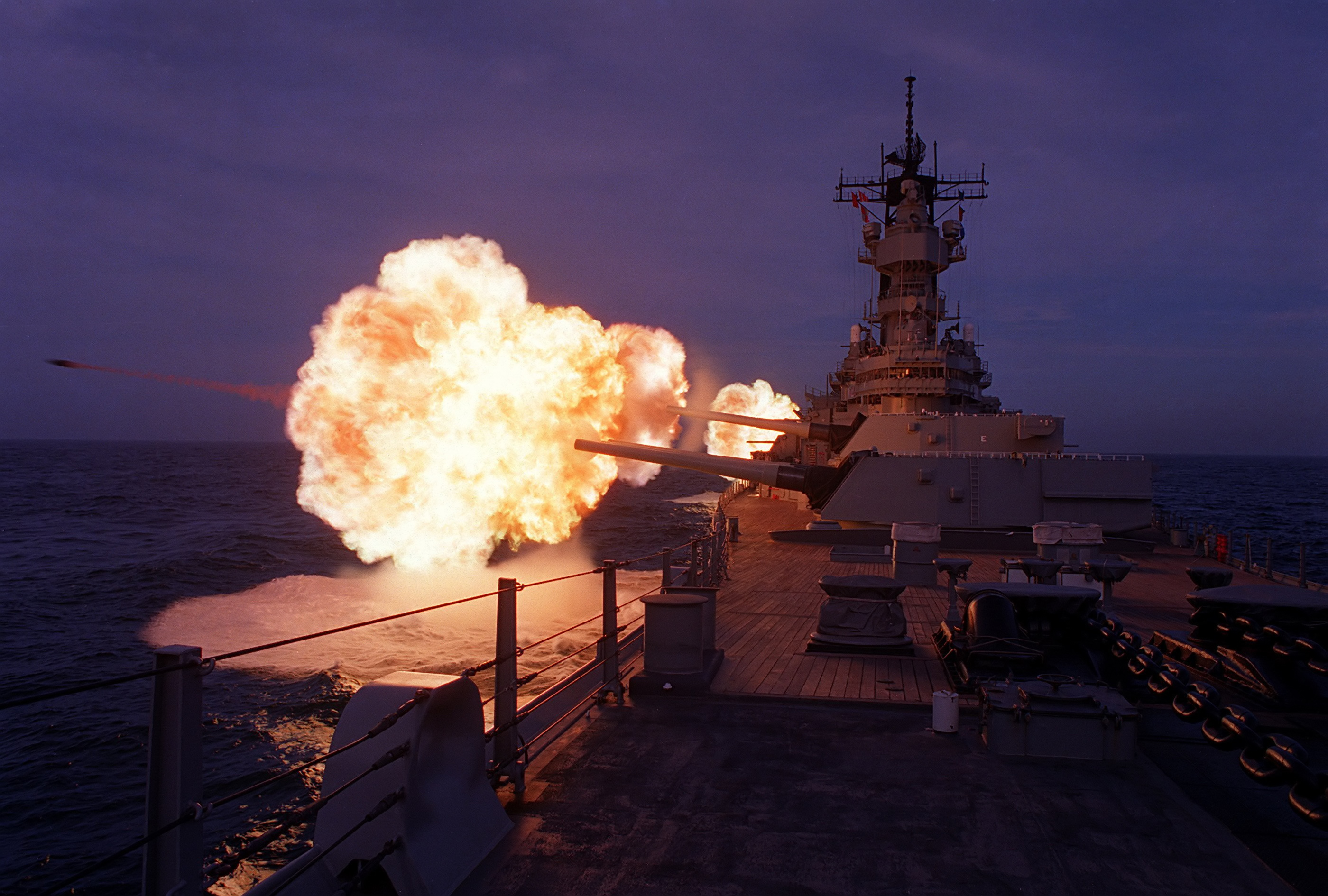
USS Missouri (BB-63) tests its guns at RIMPAC 90

=== RIMPAC 1992 ===
RIMPAC 1992 took place between 19 June and 2 August 1992. Among the vessels' taking part was the aircraft carrier USS Kitty Hawk, which was assigned to Battle Force X-Ray, which included ten Japan Maritime Self-Defense Force (JMSDF) vessels, including the submarine JDS Mochishio.

During the exercise, a minor incident occurred when on 13 July 1992, a Qantas Boeing 747-400 flying from Los Angeles to Sydney inadvertently entered into the exercise's area near Hawaii. The aircraft's crew soon overheard a radio warning from the cruiser USS Cowpens that 'hostile action' would be taken against any United States Air Force (USAF) aircraft (playing the role of the pretend aggressor) attempting to enter the Cowpens' defensive area. The message was accidentally broadcast on the International Air Distress Frequency instead of the internal military radio network, leading to the 747 obeying the warning and leaving the area, despite the airliner not being in any danger. This led to the US apologizing to the Australian Government. A Qantas spokesperson stated that the flight was only delayed by 19 minutes.

=== RIMPAC 1994 ===
RIMPAC 1994 involved 57 vessels, and more than 200 aircraft from the United States, Japan, South Korea, Australia, and Canada. These included USS Independence and her carrier battle group, USS Constellation battlegroup, the USS Essex amphibious ready group and the Kitty Hawk's battlegroup. RIMPAC's boundaries that year reached as far west as Midway Island. During the exercise, the Independence's air wing (CVW-5) conducted war-at-sea strikes against the Kitty Hawk, with the support of Japanese and US vessels.

=== RIMPAC 1996 ===
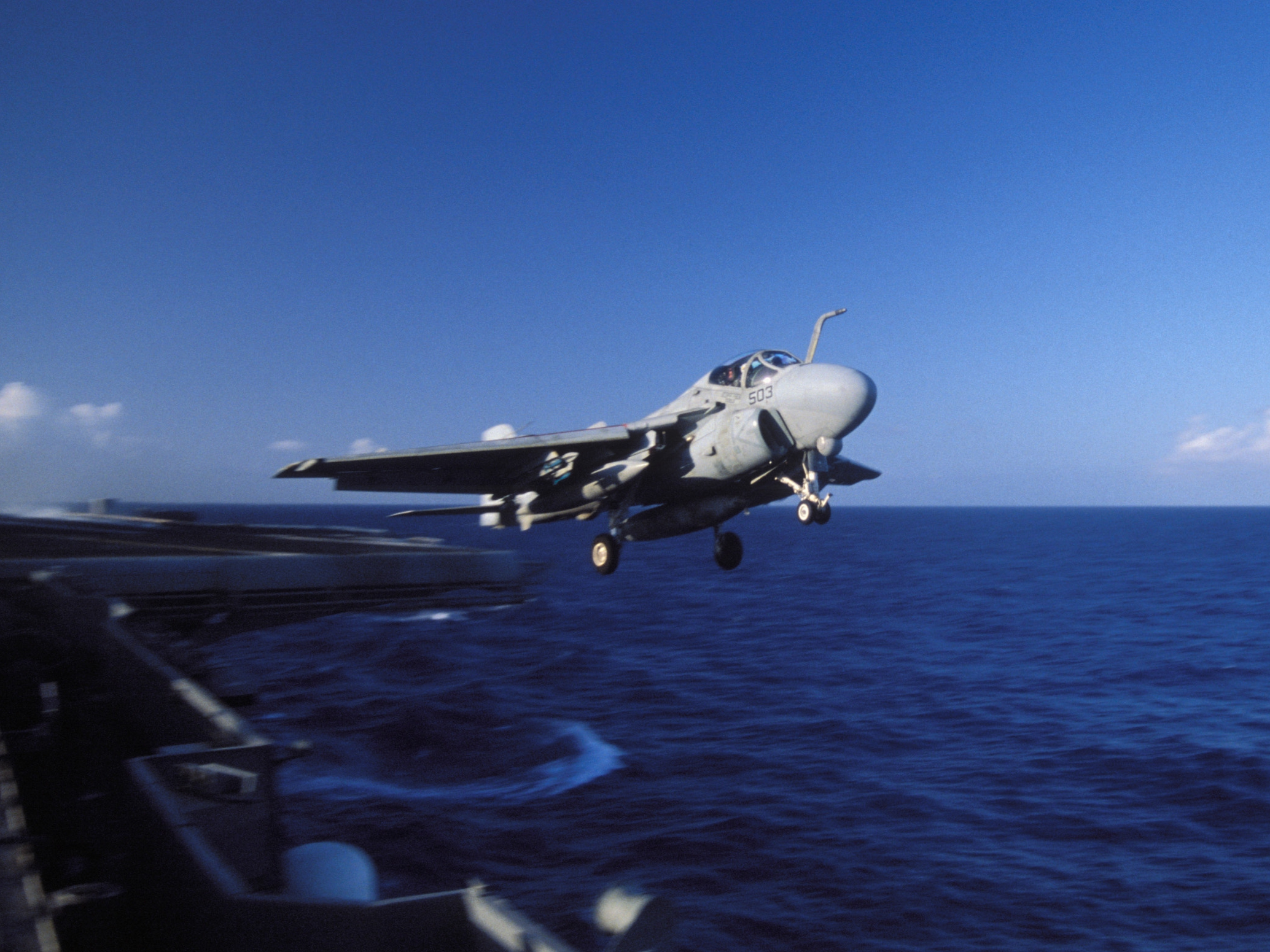
An A-6E SWIP Intruder of VA-115 launching off USS Independence in 1995

RIMPAC 1996 involved more than 48 ships and 200 aircraft. Among these vessels were the US carriers Independence, Kitty Hawk and their respective carrier battle groups. Like in RIMPAC '94, the Independence conducted air operations against the Kitty Hawk battle group.

This exercise was notable for the accidental shooting down of a US Navy aircraft by a JMSDF vessel. On 3 June 1996, an A-6E SWIP Intruder from VA-115 (NF-500, BuNo 155704) based on board the Independence was shot down around 1,600 miles (2,600 km) west of Hawaii by CIWS fire from JDS Yūgiri.

At the time of the incident (4:15 PM) in clear skies, the Intruder was at 700 ft (210 m), towing a target for Yūgiri to shoot down. The radar aboard the destroyer instead locked onto the radar signature of the Intruder and fired on it. The engines caught fire, with the hydraulics seizing up before the crew safely ejected. Initially thought to be mechanical, it was later determined to be human error. RIMPAC 1996 was the first time that the Chilean Navy was involved in the exercise.

=== RIMPAC 1998 ===
From July 6 until August 6, 1998, RIMPAC 98 took place in the waters off Hawaii and included participants from six Pacific nations. The exercise brought together maritime forces from Australia, Canada, Chile, Japan, the Republic of Korea and the United States. Notably this was HMAS Perth's (D38) last RIMPAC before being decommissioned.

=== RIMPAC 2000 ===
From 30 May until 6 July 2000, RIMPAC 2000 took place near Hawaii under the command of Vice Adm. Dennis McGinn. It included the naval forces of Australia, Canada, Chile, Japan, South Korea, the United Kingdom, and the United States of America. Over 50 ships, 200 aircraft, and 22,000 personnel participated in the exercise. RIMPAC 2000 encompassed a large combined-arms operation involving a number of land, sea, and air assets. The scale of the exercise was used to test the new Coalition-Wide Area Network (C-WAN), which connected all of the ships involved with the designated command ship of the exercise, USS Coronado.

Training operations during RIMPAC 2000 included surface warfare, amphibious landing operations, a sinking exercise (SINKEX), air operations, and the first humanitarian exercise in the history of RIMPAC.

=== RIMPAC 2010 ===
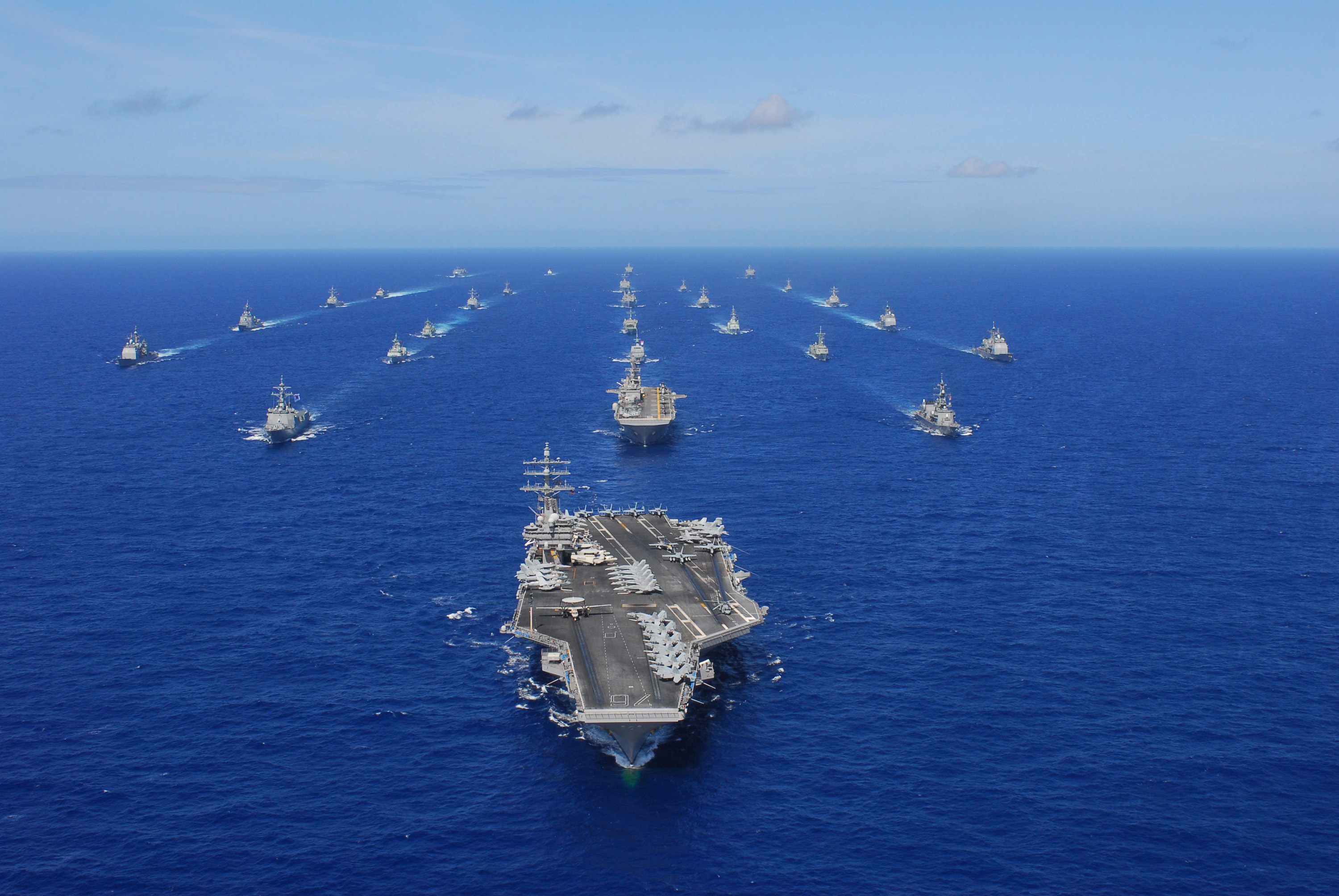
RIMPAC 2010

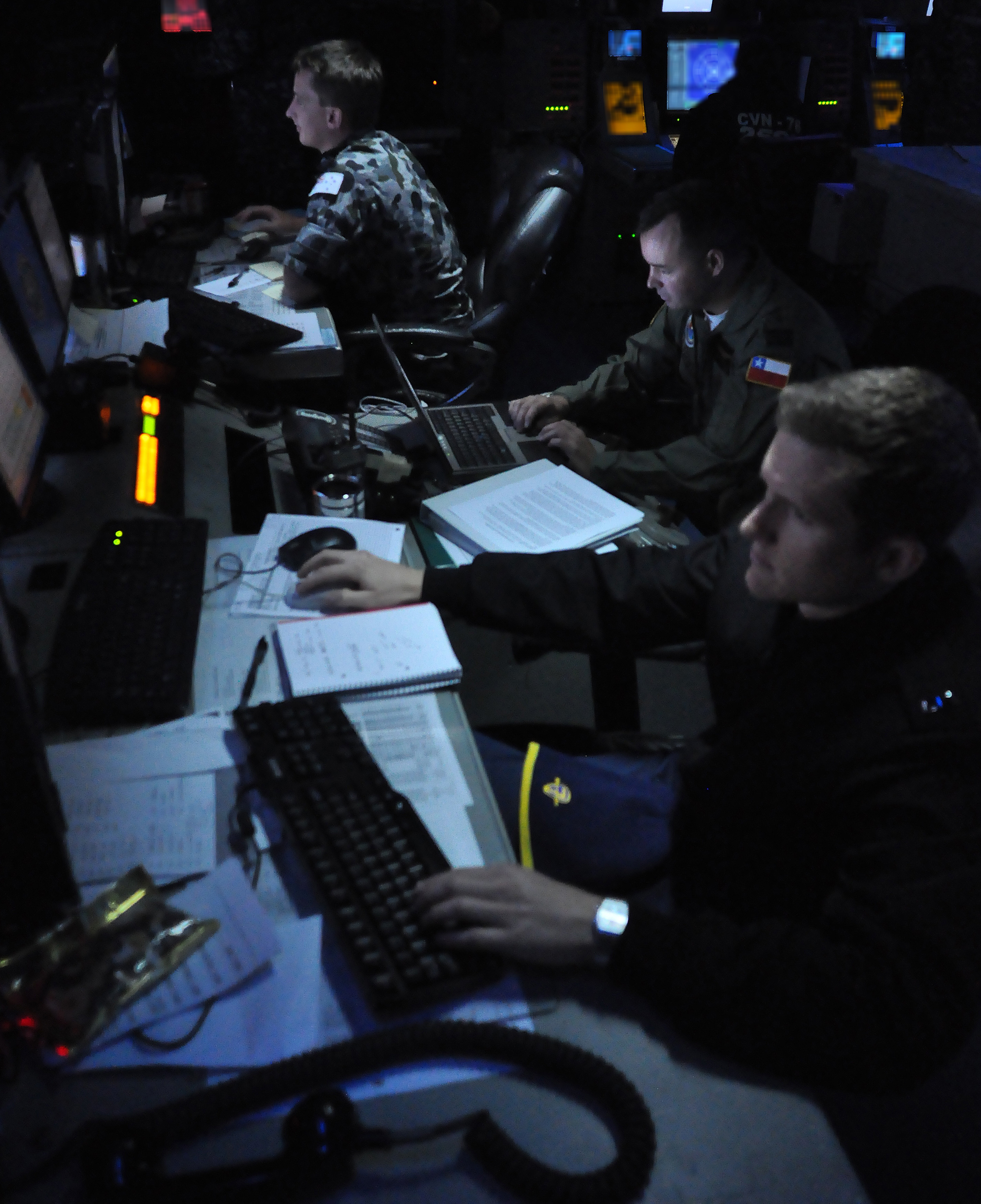
Sea Combat Control, July 2010

On 23 June 2010, U.S. Pacific Fleet commander Admiral Patrick M. Walsh and Combined Task Force commander Vice Admiral Richard W. Hunt announced the official start of the month-long 2010 Rim of the Pacific (RIMPAC) exercise during a press conference held in Lockwood Hall at Joint Base Pearl Harbor–Hickam. RIMPAC 2010 was the 22nd exercise in the series that originated in 1971. The exercise was designed to increase the operational and tactical proficiency of participating units in a wide array of maritime operations by enhancing military-to-military relations and interoperability. 32 ships, 5 submarines, over 170 aircraft, and 20,000 personnel participated in RIMPAC 2010, the world's largest multi-national maritime exercise.

RIMPAC 2010 brought together units and personnel from Australia, Canada, Chile, Colombia, France, Indonesia, Japan, Malaysia, the Netherlands, Peru, South Korea, Singapore, Thailand, and the United States. During the exercise, participating countries conducted gunnery, missile, anti-submarine, and air defense exercises, as well as maritime interdiction and vessel boarding, explosive ordnance disposal, diving and salvage operations, mine clearance operations, and an amphibious landing. RIMPAC 2010 also emphasized littoral operations with ships like the U.S. littoral combat ship Freedom, the French frigate Prairial, and the Singaporean Formidable-class frigate RSS Supreme.

On 28 June 2010, the aircraft carrier Ronald Reagan arrived in Pearl Harbor to participate in RIMPAC 2010. Ronald Reagan was the only aircraft carrier to participate in this exercise. During the in-port phase of RIMPAC, officers and crew of the 14 participating navies interact in receptions, meetings, and athletic events. Ronald Reagan completed its Tailored Ships Training Availability (TSTA) exercises before RIMPAC 2010.

During 6–7 July 2010, 32 naval vessels and five submarines from seven nations departed Pearl Harbor to participate in Phase II of RIMPAC 2010. This phase included live fire gunnery and missile exercises; maritime interdiction and vessel boardings; and anti-surface warfare, undersea warfare, naval maneuvers, and air defense exercises. Participants also collaborated in explosive ordnance disposal, diving and salvage operations, mine clearance operations, and amphibious operations. Phase III involved scenario-driven exercises designed to further strengthen maritime skills and capabilities.

During RIMPAC 2010, over 40 naval personnel from Singapore, Japan, Australia, Chile, Peru, and Colombia managed combat exercises while serving aboard Ronald Reagan. This involved managing anti-submarine warfare and surface warfare for Carrier Strike Group Seven and the entire RIMPAC force, including the use of radar, charts, and high-tech devices to monitor, chart, and communicate with other ships and submarines. Tactical action officers from the different countries coordinated the overall operational picture and provided direction and administration to the enlisted personnel involved in the Sea Combat Control (SCC) activities. Also, Ronald Reagan conducted a live Rolling Airframe Missile (RAM) launch, firing at a simulated target, the first since 2007.

On 30 July 2010, RIMPAC 2010 concluded with a press conference held at Merry Point Landing on Joint Base Pearl Harbor–Hickam. A reception for over 1,500 participants, distinguished visitors, and special guests was held in the hangar bays of the carrier Ronald Reagan.

During RIMPAC 2010, participating countries conducted three sinking exercises (SINKEX), involving 140 discrete live-fire events, that included 30 surface-to-air engagements, 40 air-to-air missile engagements, 12 surface-to-surface engagements, 76 laser-guided bombs, and more than 1,000 rounds of naval gunfire from 20 surface combatant warships. Units flew more than 3,100 air sorties, completed numerous maritime interdiction and vessel boardings, explosive ordnance disposal, diving and salvage operations, and mine clearance operations, and 10 major experiments, with the major one being the U.S. Marine Corps Enhanced Company Operations experiment.

Ground forces from five countries completed five amphibious landings, including nine helicopter-borne amphibious landings, and 560 troops took part in a ship-to-shore mission. In all, 960 different training events were scheduled. 96 percent were completed in all areas of the Hawaiian operations area, encompassing Kāneʻohe Bay, Bellows Air Force Station, the Pacific Missile Range Facility, and the Pohakuloa Training Area.

=== RIMPAC 2012 ===
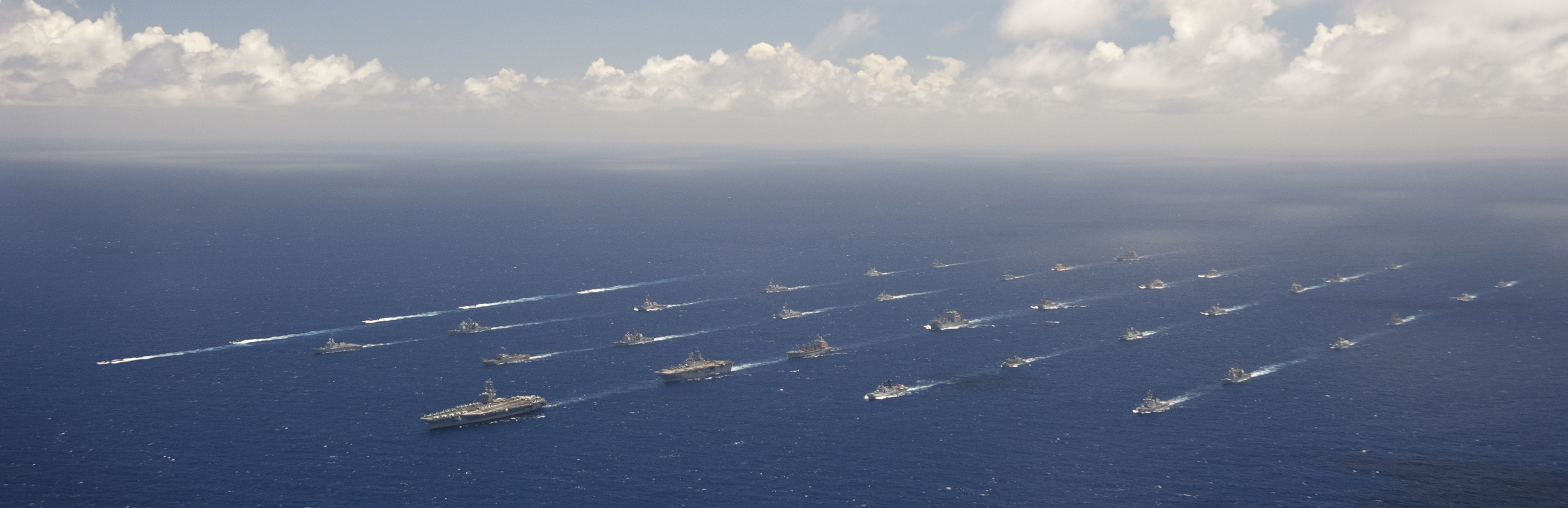
RIMPAC 2012 ships

RIMPAC 2012 participating vessels
| Royal Australian Navy | HMAS Darwin; HMAS Farncomb; HMAS Perth |
| Royal Canadian Navy | HMCS Algonquin; HMCS Ottawa; HMCS Victoria; HMCS Yellowknife |
| Chilean Navy | Almirante Lynch |
| French Navy | Prairial |
| Japan Maritime Self-Defense Force | JS Myōkō; JS Shirane; JS Bungo |
| Mexican Navy | ARM Usumacinta |
| Royal New Zealand Navy | HMNZS Endeavour; HMNZS Te Kaha |
| Republic of Korea Navy | ROKS Choe Yeong; ROKS Na Dae-yong; ROKS Yulgok Yi I |
| Republic of Singapore Navy | RSS Formidable |
| Russian Navy | Admiral Panteleyev; Fotiy Krylov; Irkut |
| United States Navy and Coast Guard | Warships: USS Chafee; USS Charlotte; USS Cheyenne; USS Chosin; USS Chung-Hoon; USS Crommelin; USS Essex; USS Gary; USS Higgins; USS Lake Erie; USS Nimitz; USS North Carolina; USS Paul Hamilton; USS Port Royal; USS Princeton; USS Reuben James; USS Stockdale; USCGC Bertholf |
| United States Navy and Coast Guard | Auxiliary ships: USNS Henry J. Kaiser; USNS Matthew Perry; USNS Salvor; USNS Yukon |

RIMPAC 2012 is the 23rd exercise in the series and started on 29 June 2012. 42 ships, including the aircraft carrier USS Nimitz and other elements of Carrier Strike Group 11, six submarines, 200 aircraft and 25,000 personnel from 22 nations took part in Hawaii. The exercise involved surface combatants from the U.S., Canada, Japan, Australia, South Korea, and Chile.

The US Navy demonstrated its 'Great Green Fleet' of biofuel-driven vessels for which it purchased 450,000 gallons of biofuel, the largest single purchase of biofuel in history, for $12m. On 17 July, USNS Henry J. Kaiser delivered 900,000 gallons of biofuel and traditional petroleum-based fuel to Nimitz's Carrier Strike Group 11.

The exercises included units or personnel from Australia, Canada, Chile, Colombia, France, India, Indonesia, Japan, Malaysia, Mexico, Netherlands, New Zealand, Norway, Peru, the Republic of Korea, the Republic of the Philippines, Russia, Singapore, Thailand, Tonga, the United Kingdom and the United States. Russia participated actively for the first time, as did the Philippines, reportedly due to the escalating tensions with the People's Republic of China over ownership of Scarborough Shoal.

RIMPAC 2012 marked the debut of the U.S. Navy's new P-8A Poseidon land-based anti-submarine patrol aircraft. Two P-8As participated in 24 RIMPAC exercise scenarios as part of Air Test and Evaluation Squadron One (VX-1) based at Marine Corps Base Hawaii in Kaneohe Bay.

The 2012 movie Battleship is about two Arleigh-Burke-class destroyers (USS John Paul Jones and USS Sampson) and one Japanese Kongō-class destroyer (JS Myoko) discovering an alien armada during RIMPAC 2012.

=== RIMPAC 2014 ===
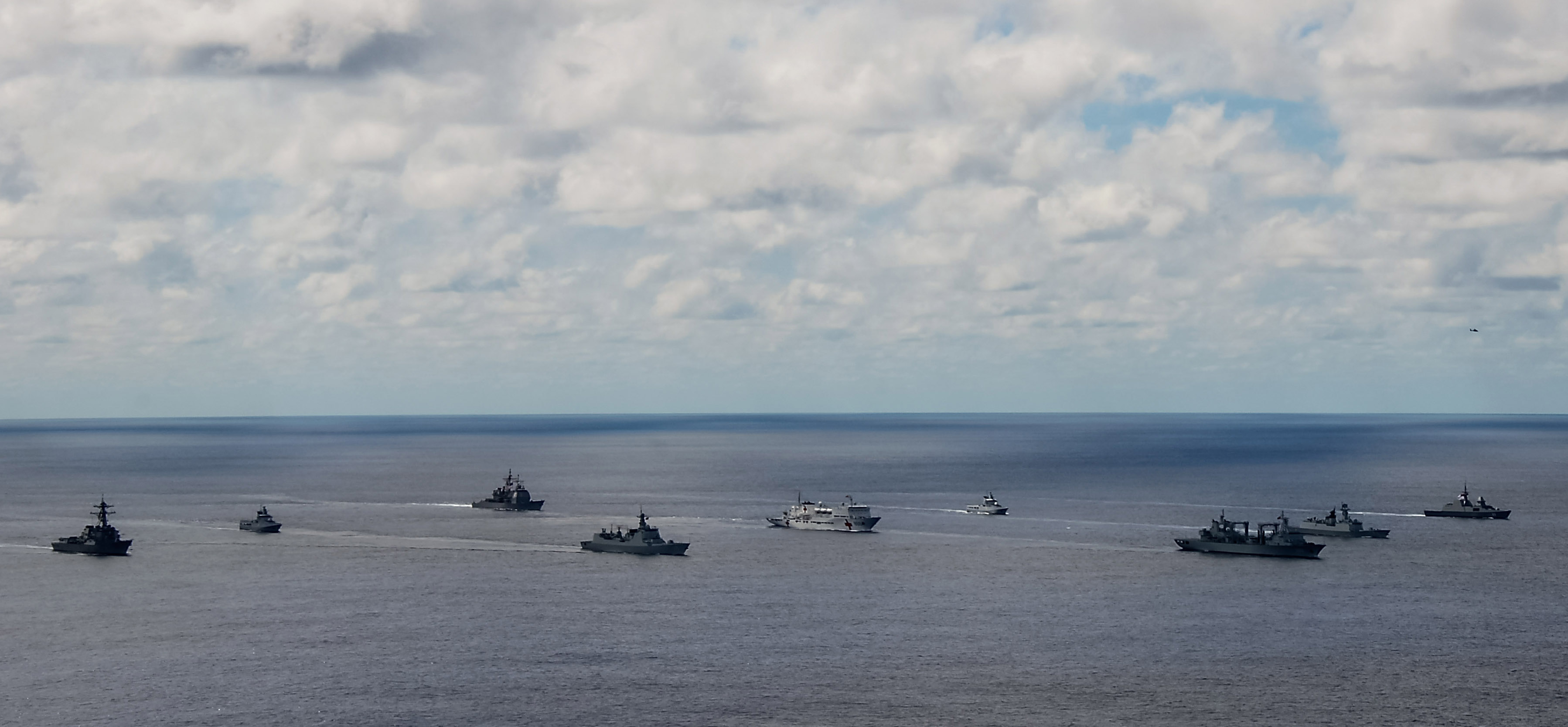
Multinational task force in RIMPAC 2014.

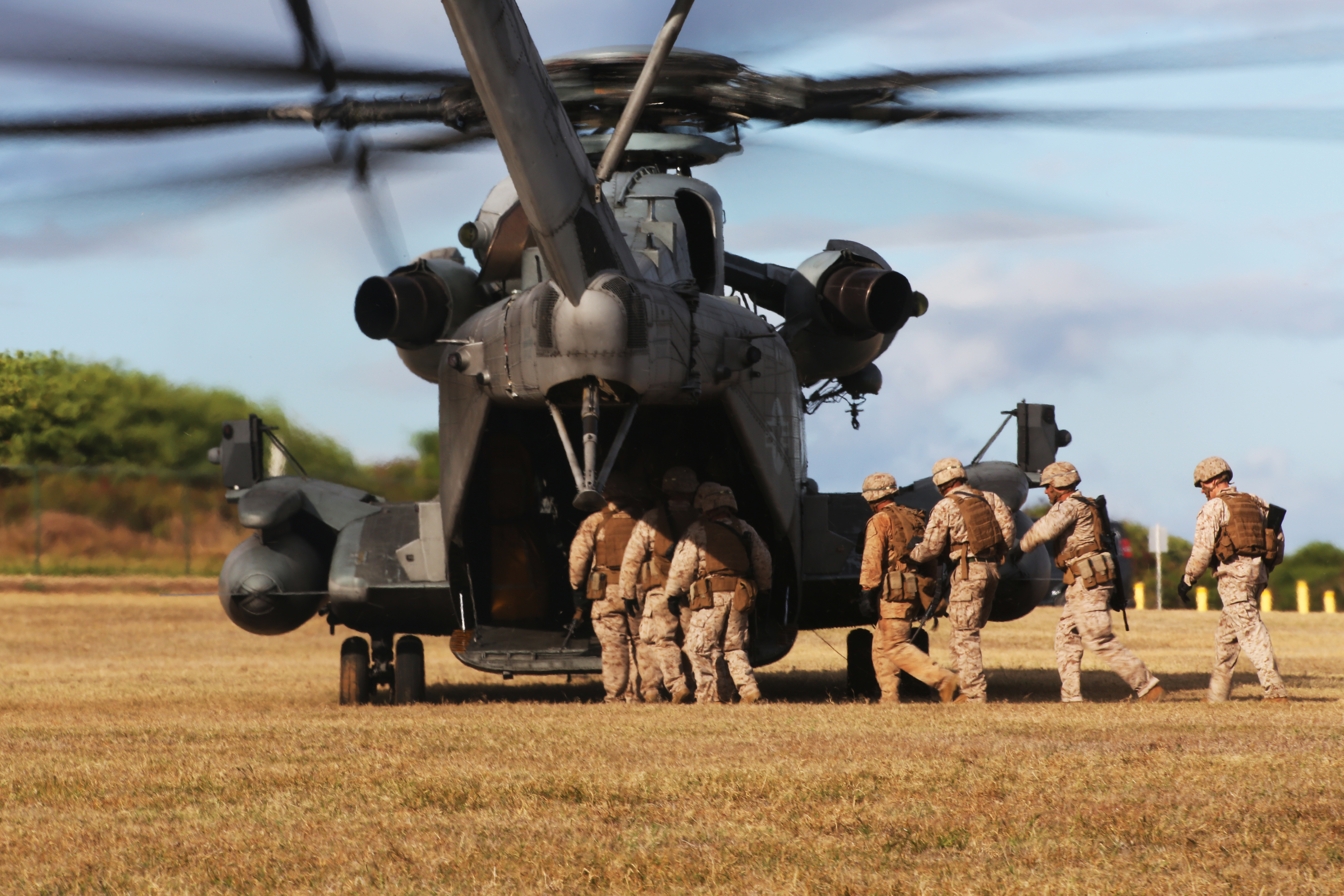
Marines board a CH-53E helicopter, during RIMPAC 2014

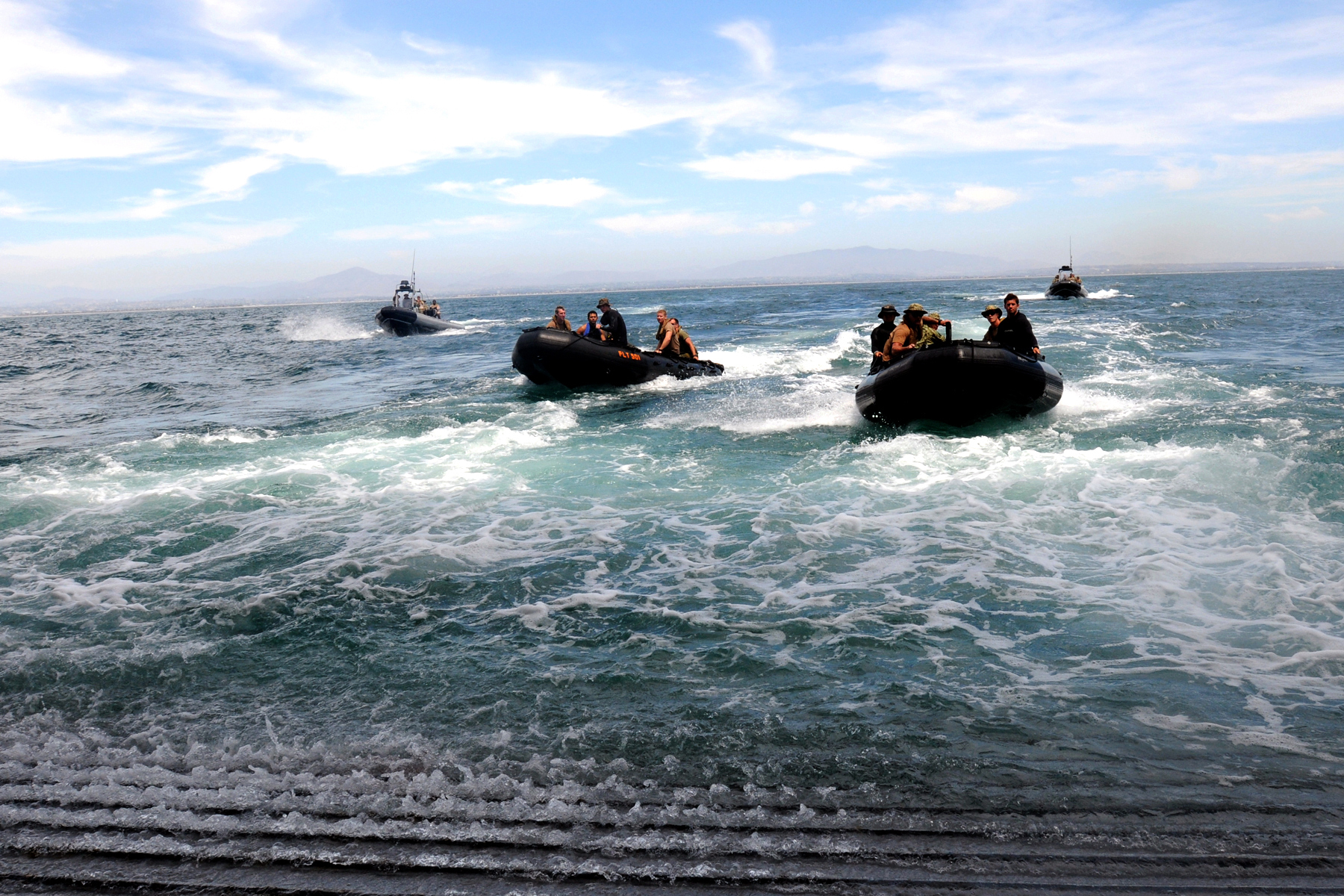
Divers on exercise during RIMPAC

RIMPAC 2014 participating forces
| Royal Australian Navy | HMAS Success; HMAS Sheean; Learjet 35; MRH-90 Taipan; Diving detachment Explosive Ordnance Disposal Unit; Land forces |
| Royal Brunei Navy | KDB Darussalam; KDB Darulaman |
| Royal Canadian Navy | HMCS Calgary; HMCS Victoria; Diving detachments |
| Royal Canadian Air Force | 1 CC-130T Hercules; 1 CC-150T Polaris; 6 CF-18 Hornet; 3 CP-140 Aurora |
| Chilean Navy | Almirante Blanco Encalada; SH-32 Cougar |
| Colombian National Navy | ARC Almirante Padilla; AS555 Fennec 2 |
| French Navy | Prairial; Alouette LUH |
| Indian Navy | INS Sahyadri; Alouette LUH |
| Indonesian Navy | KRI Banda Aceh; Land forces |
| Japan Maritime Self-Defense Force | JS Kirishima; JS Ise; P-3C Orion; SH-60K Seahawk; Diving detachment Land forces |
| Royal Malaysian Navy | Infantry platoon |
| Mexican Navy | ARM Revolucion; AS565 Panther; Land forces |
| Royal Netherlands Navy | Component staff personnel |
| Royal New Zealand Navy | HMNZS Canterbury; SH-2G Sea Sprite; Mine counter measure detachment Land forces Operational dive team |
| Royal New Zealand Air Force | P-3K2 Orion |
| Royal Norwegian Navy | HNoMS Fridtjof Nansen |
| People's Liberation Army Navy | Haikou; Yueyang; Qiandaohu; Peace Ark; Z-8 Changhe; Z-9 Harbin; Dive unit Type 815 spy ship Beijixing, uninvited external observer. |
| Peruvian Navy | Component staff personnel |
| Republic of Korea Navy | ROKS Seoae Ryu Seong-ryong; ROKS Wang Geon; ROKS Yi Sun-sin; P-3C Orion; Super Lynx Mk.99; Explosive Ordnance Disposal Unit; Land Forces |
| Philippine Navy | Component staff personnel |
| Republic of Singapore Navy | RSS Intrepid; S-70B Seahawk |
| Tongan Navy | Infantry platoon |
| Royal Navy | Component staff personnel |
| United States Navy and United States Coast Guard | USS Cape St. George; USS Chafee; USS Chosin; USS Gary; USS Independence; USS Lake Champlain; USS Michael Murphy; USS Peleliu; USS Port Royal; USS Rodney M. Davis; USS Ronald Reagan; USS Rushmore; USS Sampson; USS Spruance; USNS Henry J. Kaiser; USNS John Ericsson; USNS Mercy; USNS Navajo; USNS Rainier; USNS Salvor; USCGC Waesche; 3 submarines AH-1W Super Cobra; AH-64D Apache; B-52H Stratofortress; C-17 Globemaster III; C-2A Greyhound; CH-47F Chinook; CH-53 Sea Stallion; E-2C Hawkeye; E-3B/C Sentry; EA-6B Prowler; EP-3 ARIES; F/A-18C/D/E/F Hornet/Super Hornet; EA-18G Growler; F-16 Fighting Falcon; F-15E Strike Eagle; F-22 Raptor; HC-130 King; HH-60L/MH-60M Blackhawk; KC-135R Stratotanker; Learjet 35; Hawker Hunter; MH-60R/S Seahawk; MH-53D/E Super Stallion; MQ-9 Predator; OH-58D Kiowa; P-8A Poseidon; P-3C Orion; UH-1Y Venom; UH-60 Blackhawk; Explosive Ordnance Mobile Units; Mobile Dive Salvage Units; Command, ground & logistic combat elements |

RIMPAC 2014 observers
Bangladesh Navy
Brazilian Navy
Royal Danish Navy
German Navy
Italian Navy
Papua New Guinea Maritime Element

RIMPAC 2014 Southern California Operation Area
| Royal Australian Navy | Explosive Ordnance Disposal Platoon; Mine Counter Measure Dive Platoons; Autonomous Underwater Vehicle Detachment |
| Royal Canadian Navy | HMCS Nanaimo; ~~HMCS Whitehorse~~ (Whitehorse was withdrawn by the Canadian Forces for misconduct); Diving Element |
| Chilean Navy | Counter Mine Unit |
| Japan Maritime Self-Defense Force | Mine Counter Measure Dive Platoon |
| Royal Netherlands Navy | Diving Team |
| Royal New Zealand Navy | Mine Counter Measure Dive Platoon; Autonomous Underwater Vehicle Detachment |
| Peruvian Navy | Diving Detachment |
| Royal Navy | Maritime Ordnance Disposal Unit |
| United States Navy | USS Anchorage; USS Champion; USS Coronado; USNS Montford Point; USS Scout; Mobile Dive Salvage Units; Explosive Ordnance Disposal Units; Mine Counter Measure Dive Units; Marine Mammal Systems |

RIMPAC 2014 was the 24th exercise in the series and took place from 26 June to 1 August, with an opening reception on 26 June and a closing reception on 1 August.

For the first time, the Royal Norwegian Navy actively participated in the exercise. Norway sent one Fridtjof Nansen-class frigate and possibly Norwegian marine special forces. China was invited to send ships from its People's Liberation Army Navy, the first time China participated in a RIMPAC exercise, and the first time China participated in a large-scale United States-led naval drill. On 9 June 2014, China confirmed it would be sending four ships to the exercise: a destroyer, a frigate, a supply ship, and a hospital ship.

The year's RIMPAC participants were Australia, Brunei, Canada, Chile, China, Colombia, France, India, Indonesia, Japan, Malaysia, Mexico, Netherlands, New Zealand, Norway, Peru, the Philippines, Singapore, South Korea, Tonga, the United Kingdom, and the United States. Thailand was uninvited from the exercise following a 22 May military coup. Thailand's absence means that 22 nations participated in RIMPAC instead of the 23 that had been advertised. The exercise involved 55 vessels, more than 200 aircraft, and some 25,000 personnel.

China's 2014 participation in RIMPAC was its first.

=== RIMPAC 2016 ===
RIMPAC 2016 participating forces
| Royal Australian Navy | HMAS Ballarat; HMAS Canberra; HMAS Warramunga; 3 Lockheed AP-3C Orion; 1 Learjet 35; 1 MH-60R Seahawk; 5 MRH-90 Taipan; 1 S-70B Seahawk; Ground forces |
| Royal Brunei Navy | Staff |
| Royal Canadian Navy | HMCS Calgary; HMCS Vancouver |
| Royal Canadian Air Force | 1 CC-130J Super Hercules; 3 CP-140 Aurora; 1 KCC-130T Hercules; 8 CF-18 Hornet |
| Chilean Navy | Almirante Cochrane; SH-32 Cougar helicopter |
| People's Liberation Army Navy | Changdao; Gaoyouhu; Hengshui; Peace Ark; Xi'an |
| Colombian National Navy | Staff |
| Royal Danish Navy | Staff |
| French Navy | Prairial |
| German Navy | Ground forces (Seebataillon und Reservisten des Dezernates Marineschifffahrtleitung) |
| Indian Navy | INS Satpura |
| Indonesian Navy | KRI Diponegoro; Ground forces |
| Italian Navy | Staff and Ground forces |
| Japan Maritime Self-Defense Force | JS Chōkai; JS Hyūga; 2 P-3C Orion |
| Royal Malaysian Navy | Ground forces |
| Mexican Navy | Staff |
| Royal Netherlands Navy | Ground forces |
| Royal New Zealand Navy | HMNZS Te Kaha; 2 P-3K2 Orion; 1 SH-2G (I) Seasprite; Ground forces |
| Royal Norwegian Navy | Ground forces |
| Peruvian Navy | Ground forces |
| Philippine Navy | Staff |
| Republic of Singapore Navy | RSS Steadfast |
| Republic of Korea Navy | ROKS Gang Gam-chan; ROKS Sejong the Great; ROKS Yi Eokgi; 1 P-3C Orion; Ground forces |
| Royal Thai Navy | Staff |
| Tongan Navy | Ground forces |
| Royal Navy | Staff |
| United States Navy and United States Coast Guard | USS America; USS Chung-Hoon; USS Coronado; USS Howard; USS John C. Stennis; USS Mobile Bay; USS Pinckney; USS Princeton; USS San Diego; USS Shoup; USS Stockdale; USS William P. Lawrence; USNS Henry J. Kaiser; USNS Navajo; USNS Rainier; USNS Rappahannock; USNS Safeguard; USNS Washington Chambers; USCGC Stratton; 4 submarines 2 B-52H Stratofortress; 2 E-3B/C Sentry; 2 KC-130 Hercules; 3 KC-135R Stratotanker; 1 MC-130J Commando II; 8 RQ-7Bv2 Shadow; 8 F-16 Fighting Falcon; 4 F-22 Raptor; 10 F/A-18 Super Hornet; 3 AH-1W SuperCobra; 1 CH-47F Chinook; 4 CH-53E Super Stallion; 1 HH-60M Pave Hawk; 6 MV-22B Osprey; 1 OAH-64D Apache; 2 UH-1Y Venom; 1 UH-60M Black Hawk; Ground forces |

RIMPAC 2016 Southern California Operation Area
| Royal Canadian Navy | HMCS Saskatoon; HMCS Yellowknife |
| Mexican Navy | ARM Usumacinta |
| United States Navy | USS Champion; USS Freedom; USS Pearl Harbor |

India participated in RIMPAC 2016.

In April 2016, the People's Republic of China was invited to RIMPAC 2016 despite the tension in the South China Sea.

=== RIMPAC 2018 ===
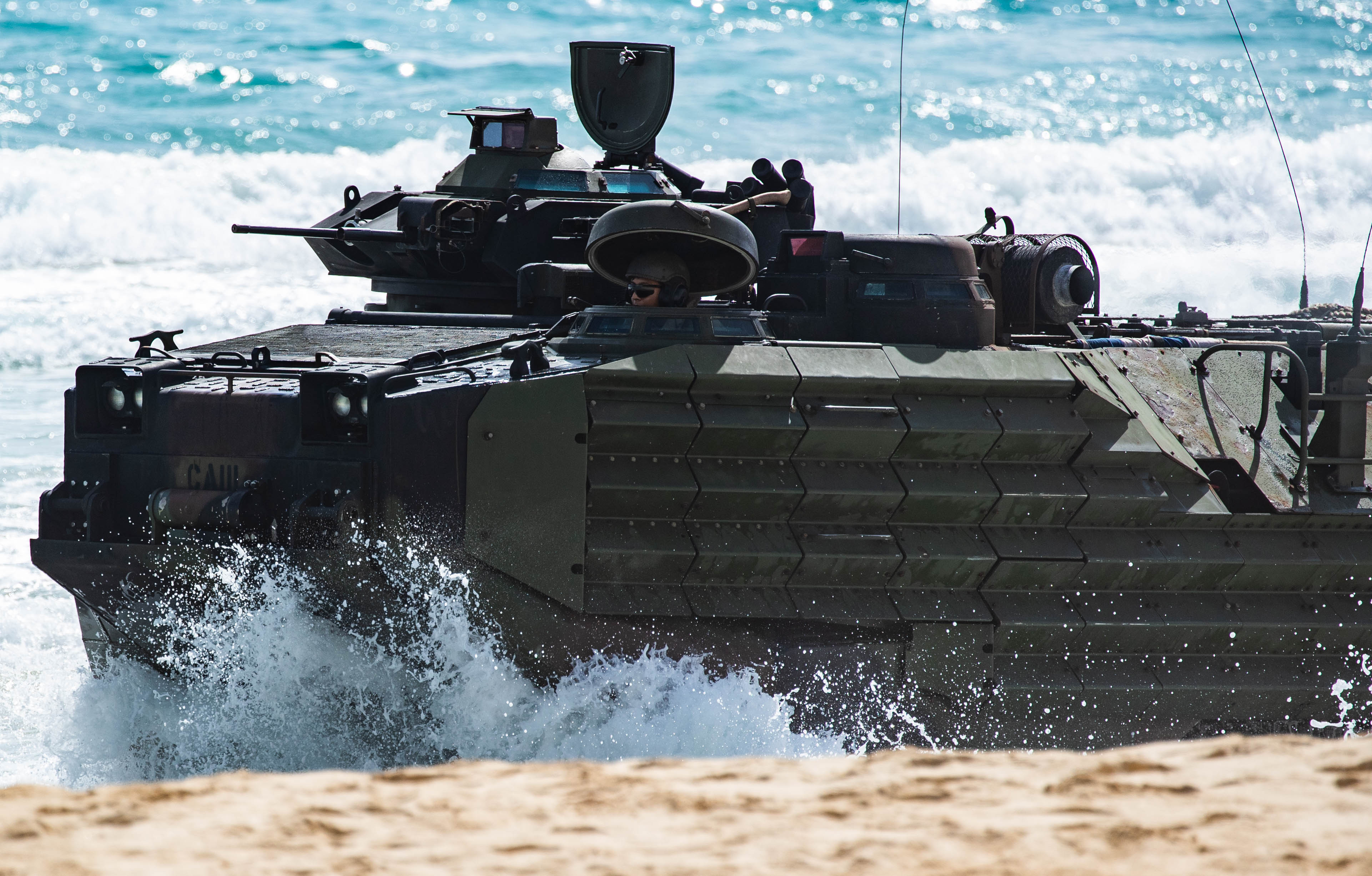
A landing vehicle practicing on a beach at RIMPAC 2018

In January 2018, China announced that it had been invited. On 23 May 2018, the Pentagon announced that it had "disinvited" China because of recent militarization of islands in the South China Sea. The PRC had previously attended RIMPAC Exercises in 2014 and 2016.

On 30 May 2018, the US Navy announced that about 25,000 naval personnel and 52 ships and submarines from 26 countries would participate.

RIMPAC 2018 participating forces
| Royal Australian Navy | HMAS Adelaide; HMAS Toowoomba; HMAS Melbourne; HMAS Rankin; HMAS Success |
| Royal Australian Air Force | RAAF P-8A Poseidon |
| Royal Brunei Navy | Staff |
| Royal Canadian Navy | HMCS Vancouver; HMCS Ottawa; HMCS Yellowknife; HMCS Whitehorse; MV Asterix |
| Royal Canadian Air Force | CP-140 Aurora |
| Chilean Navy | Almirante Lynch; Ground forces |
| Colombian National Navy | Staff |
| French Navy | Prairial |
| German Navy | Ground forces Staff |
| Indian Navy | INS Sahyadri |
| Indonesian Navy | KRI Raden Eddy Martadinata; KRI Makassar |
| Israeli Navy | Staff |
| Italian Navy | Ground forces Staff |
| Japan Maritime Self-Defense Force | JS Ise |
| Royal Malaysian Navy | KD Lekiu |
| Mexican Navy | ARM Usumacinta |
| Royal Netherlands Navy | Staff |
| Royal New Zealand Navy | HMNZS Te Mana; 1 SH-2G (I) Seasprite; Ground forces Staff |
| Royal New Zealand Air Force | 2 P-3 Orion |
| Peruvian Navy | BAP Ferré |
| Philippine Navy | BRP Andrés Bonifacio; BRP Davao del Sur |
| Republic of Singapore Navy | RSS Tenacious |
| Republic of Korea Navy | ROKS Yulgok Yi I ROKS Dae Jo-yeong; ROKS Park Wi |
| Sri Lanka Navy | Ground forces |
| Royal Thai Navy | Staff |
| Tongan Navy | Staff |
| Royal Navy | Staff |
| United States Navy | USS Carl Vinson; USS Bonhomme Richard; USS John P. Murtha; USS Harpers Ferry; USS Lake Erie; USS Lake Champlain; USS Dewey; USS William P. Lawrence; USS Halsey; USS Momsen; USS O'Kane; USS Preble; USS Sterett; USS Ardent; USS Hawaii; USS Olympia; USCGC Bertholf; USNS Rappahannock; USNS Henry J. Kaiser; USNS Charles Drew; USNS Carl Brashear; USNS Mercy; USNS Sioux; HOS Mystique |
| Vietnam People's Navy | Staff |

In this edition of RIMPAC, the Chilean Navy was responsible for leading the naval exercise, being the first non-English-speaking Navy to carry out this task. The election of Chile as leader of the Task Groups recognises the high performance achieved in prior RIMPAC exercises and the quality of Chilean personnel, which since Chile's first participation in 1996 have demonstrated high preparation and professionalism.

Israel, Vietnam and Sri Lanka made their debut in RIMPAC. Brazil was due to make its debut, but cancelled its participation for the second time. The exercise included a live firing of the AGM-158C LRASM (Long Range Anti-Ship Missile) for the first time.

=== RIMPAC 2020 ===
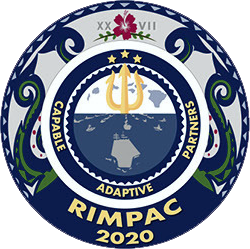
The insignia for RIMPAC 2020

On 29 April 2020, the US Navy announced RIMPAC would be held from 17 to 30 August. It would be an at-sea-only event because of the ongoing COVID-19 pandemic. Twenty-five (25) nations have been invited to participate. Israel was among the original 25 invited nations, but declined to attend due to the pandemic. There had been some opposition to New Zealand's participation, and there have been calls from peace activists for New Zealand not to attend. The Philippines sent its first missile-capable frigate on its maiden voyage, which was commissioned into service in July 2020, as its "shakedown cruise" where its performance would be tested by the crew in the two-week exercises.

On 17 August 2020, the US Navy announced that participation has scaled down to 10 nations, 22 ships, one submarine, and approximately 5,300 personnel, all at sea. These are the following navies that would take part in the exercise:

RIMPAC 2020 participating forces
| Royal Australian Navy | HMAS Hobart; HMAS Arunta; HMAS Stuart; HMAS Sirius |
| Royal Brunei Navy | KDB Darulehsan |
| Royal Canadian Navy | HMCS Regina; HMCS Winnipeg |
| French Navy | Bougainville |
| Japan Maritime Self-Defense Force | JS Ise; JS Ashigara |
| Royal New Zealand Navy | HMNZS Manawanui |
| Republic of Korea Navy | ROKS Seoae Ryu Seong-ryong; ROKS Chungmugong Yi Sun-sin |
| Philippine Navy | BRP Jose Rizal |
| Republic of Singapore Navy | RSS Supreme |
| United States Navy and United States Coast Guard | USS Essex; USS Lake Erie; USS Chung-Hoon; USS Dewey; USS Jefferson City; USCGC Munro; USNS Henry J. Kaiser; USNS Sioux |

On 29 August 2020, forces began firing on former USS Durham, a Charleston-class amphibious cargo vessel that was decommissioned in 1994. The US Navy and partner nations wrapped up the biennial RIMPAC 2020 exercise over the weekend with the sinking of the decommissioned amphibious cargo vessel.

=== RIMPAC 2022 ===
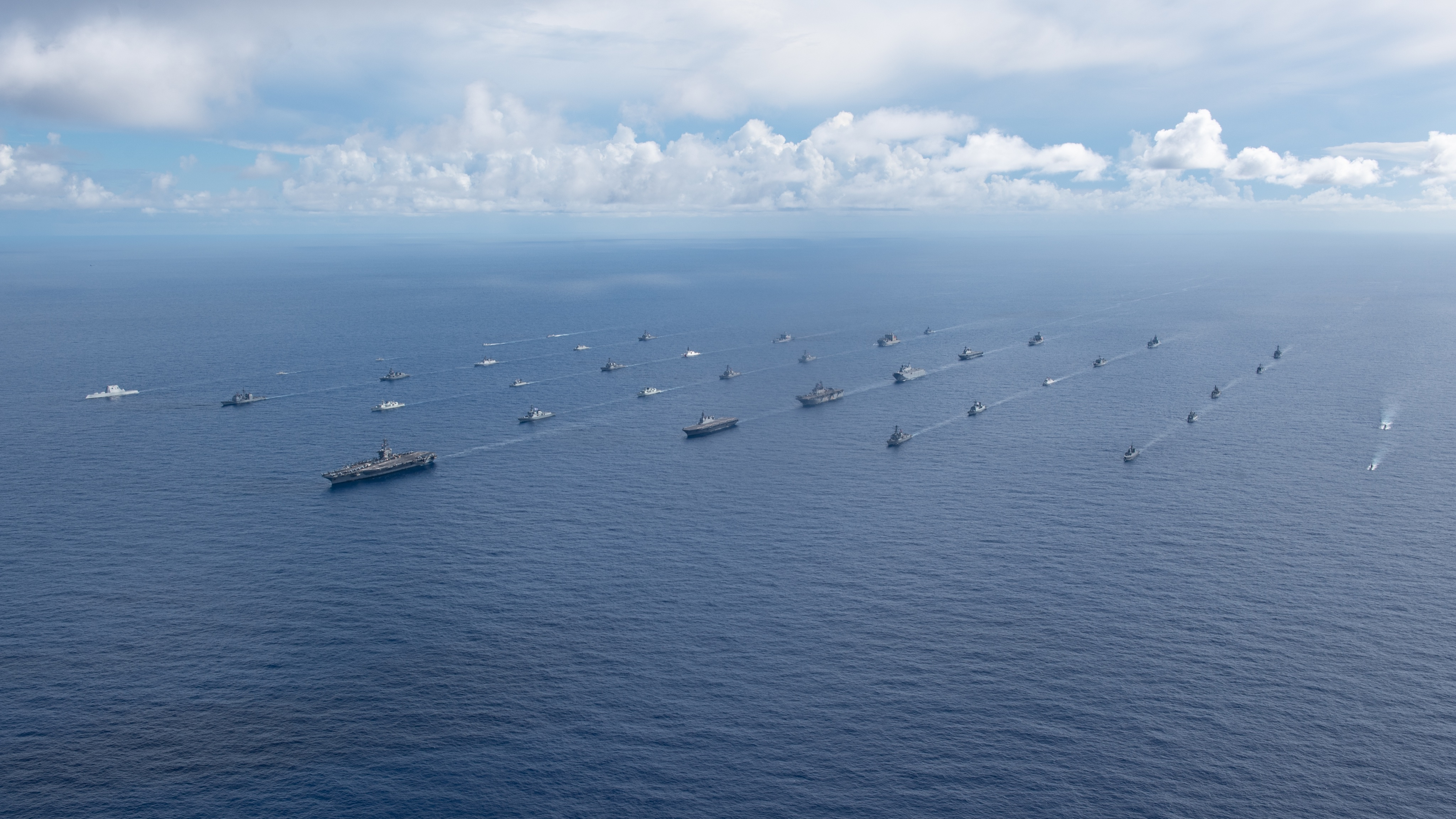
Ships sail in formation during RIMPAC 2022

RIMPAC 2022 was held in the summer of that year, between 29 June and 4 August. It was expected to be a more traditional RIMPAC with the loosening of COVID-19 restrictions.

On 23 February 2022, it was announced that 27 countries are expected to take part. On 14 April 2022, it was announced that Canada would send four warships to participate. The same day, Peru announced that the corvette BAP Guise would take part.

On 1 June 2022, a total of 26 countries have confirmed to take part at Exercise RIMPAC 2022, with the list as follows: Australia, Brunei, Canada, Chile, Colombia, Denmark, Ecuador, France, Germany, India, Indonesia, Israel, Japan, South Korea, Malaysia, Mexico, the Netherlands, New Zealand, Peru, the Philippines, Singapore, Sri Lanka, Thailand, Tonga, the United Kingdom, and the United States, being 11 countries from Asia, 5 countries from Europe, 4 countries from South America, 3 countries from North America and 3 countries from Oceania.

RIMPAC 2022 participating forces
| Royal Australian Navy | HMAS Canberra; HMAS Warramunga; HMAS Supply |
| Royal Canadian Navy | HMCS Vancouver; HMCS Winnipeg; HMCS Brandon; HMCS Edmonton |
| Indonesian Navy | KRI I Gusti Ngurah Rai |
| French Navy | Prairial |
| German Navy | Special Forces Detachment |
| Japan Maritime Self-Defense Force | JS Izumo; JS Takanami |
| Republic of Korea Navy | ROKS Marado; ROKS Sejong the Great; ROKS Munmu the Great; ROKS Shin Dol-seok |
| Royal Malaysian Navy | KD Lekir |
| Mexican Navy | ARM Usumacinta; ARM Benito Juárez |
| Royal New Zealand Navy | HMNZS Aotearoa |
| Indian Navy | INS Satpura |
| Israeli Navy | Special Forces Detachment |
| Peruvian Navy | BAP Guise |
| Philippine Navy | BRP Antonio Luna |
| Republic of Singapore Navy | RSS Intrepid |
| Sri Lanka Navy | Marine detachment |
| Chilean Navy | Almirante Lynch |
| United States Navy | USS Abraham Lincoln; USS Mobile Bay; USS Fitzgerald; USS Gridley; USS Sampson; USS Spruance; USS William P. Lawrence; USS Chafee; USS Essex; USS Michael Monsoor; USNS Pecos; USNS Henry J. Kaiser; USS Topeka; USS Charlotte; USNS Washington Chambers |

RIMPAC 2022 Southern California Operation Area
| United States Navy | USS Portland |

=== RIMPAC 2024 ===
RIMPAC 2024 included ships and personnel from 29 countries. It is reported that the decommissioned ship USS Tarawa was used in a sinking exercise as part of Exercise RIMPAC 2024. The U.S. Navy officially unveiled the AIM-174B air-to-air missile, an "Air-Launched Configuration" of the RIM-174 Standard ERAM surface-to-air missile. The AIM-174 is the first dedicated long-range air-to-air missile fielded by the U.S. military since the Navy's retirement of the AIM-54 Phoenix.

During RIMPAC 2024, a containerized hybrid manufacturing system incorporating Meltio's wire-laser directed energy deposition technology was operated by the Naval Postgraduate School aboard USS Somerset (LPD-25). The system was used to print and install a replacement pump part, restoring mission capability within 34 hours.

RIMPAC 2024 participating forces
| Royal Australian Navy | HMAS Sydney |
| Belgian Navy | |
| Brazilian Navy | |
| Royal Brunei Navy | KDB Darulaman; KDB Darussalam |
| Royal Canadian Navy | HMCS Max Bernays; HMCS Vancouver; Asterix |
| Chilean Navy | Almirante Condell |
| Colombian National Navy | |
| Royal Danish Navy | |
| Ecuadorian Navy | |
| French Navy | Bretagne |
| German Navy | Baden-Württemberg; Frankfurt am Main |
| Indian Navy | INS Shivalik; Boeing P-8I Neptune |
| Indonesian Navy | KRI Raden Eddy Martadinata |
| Israeli Navy | |
| Italian Navy | Raimondo Montecuccoli |
| Japan Maritime Self-Defense Force | JS Haguro; JS Kunisaki |
| Royal Malaysian Navy | KD Lekiu |
| Mexican Navy | ARM Benito Juárez; ARM Usumacinta |
| Royal Netherlands Navy | HNLMS Tromp |
| Royal New Zealand Navy | HMNZS Aotearoa |
| Peruvian Navy | BAP Pisco |
| Philippine Navy | Observers |
| Republic of Singapore Navy | RSS Stalwart |
| Republic of Korea Navy | ROKS Cheon Ja Bong; ROKS Chungmugong Yi Sun-sin; ROKS Lee Beom-seok; ROKS Yulgok Yi I |
| Sri Lanka Navy | |
| Royal Thai Navy | |
| Tongan Navy | |
| Royal Navy | |
| United States Navy | USCGC Midgett; USNS Grasp; USNS John Lewis; USNS Pecos; USNS Washington Chambers; USS Carl Vinson; USS Curtis Wilbur; USS Fitzgerald; USS Germantown; USS Gridley; USS Kidd; USS North Carolina; USS Princeton; USS Somerset; USS Sterett; USS Topeka; USS William P. Lawrence |

=== RIMPAC 2026 ===
RIMPAC 2026 began on June 24 and concluded on July 31. Over 30 surface ships, five submarines, 15 national land forces, more than 206 aircraft and 30,000 personnel participated in the exercise. USS Mobile Bay was sunk as part of SINKEX at the end of the exercise.

The Indian Navy participated in the exercise with a P-8I Neptune.

RIMPAC 2026 participating forces
| Royal Australian Navy | HMAS Sydney (DDG 42) |
| Royal Canadian Navy | HMCS Regina (FFH 334); HMCS Ottawa (FFH 341); HMCS Corner Brook (SSK-878); MV Asterix |
| Chilean Navy | CNS Cochrane (FF-05) |
| French Navy | FS Prairial (F731) |
| Indian Navy | Boeing P-8I Neptune |
| Italian Navy | ITS Giovanni della Bande Nere (P434) |
| Japan Maritime Self-Defense Force | JS Kongō (DDG-173) |
| Royal Malaysian Navy | KD Lekiu (FFG-30) |
| Mexican Navy | ARM Benito Juárez (POLA-101); ARM Usumacinta (A412) |
| Royal Netherlands Navy | HNLMS De Ruyter (F804) |
| Royal New Zealand Navy | HMNZS Aotearoa (A11); HMNZS Te Mana (F111) |
| Peruvian Navy | BAP Pisco (AMP-156); BAP Chipana (SS-34) |
| Philippine Navy | BRP Miguel Malvar (FFG-6) |
| Philippine Coast Guard | BRP Gabriela Silang (OPV-8301) |
| Republic of Singapore Navy | RSS Steadfast (70) |
| Republic of Korea Navy | ROKS Jeongjo the Great (DDG-995); ROKS Daejeon (FFG-823); ROKS Cheon Ja Bong (LST-687); ROKS Dosan Ahn Chang-ho (SS-083) |
| Spanish Navy | ESPS Álvaro de Bazán (F101) |
| United States Navy | USS Theodore Roosevelt (CVN-71); USS Essex (LHD-2); USS Chosin (CG-65); USS Carl M. Levin (DDG-120); USS Paul Hamilton (DDG-60; USS Decatur (DDG-73); USS Wayne E. Meyer (DDG-108); USS Columbia (SSN-771); USS Charlotte (SSN-766) |
| United States Coast Guard | USCGC Kimball (WMSL-756) |
| United States Military Sealift Command | USNS Tippecanoe (T-AO-199); USNS Guadalupe (T-AO-200); USNS Washington Chambers (T-AKE-11); MT Torm Thor |

== Experiments ==
RIMPAC experiments have included a range of sectors important to international militaries. In RIMPAC 2000, for example, the first of the Strong Angel international humanitarian response demonstrations were held on the Big Island of Hawai'i near Pu'u Pa'a. That series continued with events in the summer of 2004 and again in 2006.

Participants have also conducted exercises in ship sinking and torpedo usage. They have also tested new naval vessels and technology. For example, in 2004, the United States Navy tested the Australian-built HSV-2 Swift, a 321-foot (98 m) experimental wave-piercing catamaran that draws only 12 feet (3.7 m) of water, has a top speed of almost 50 knots (93 km/h; 58 mph), and can transport 605 tons of cargo.

== Gallery ==
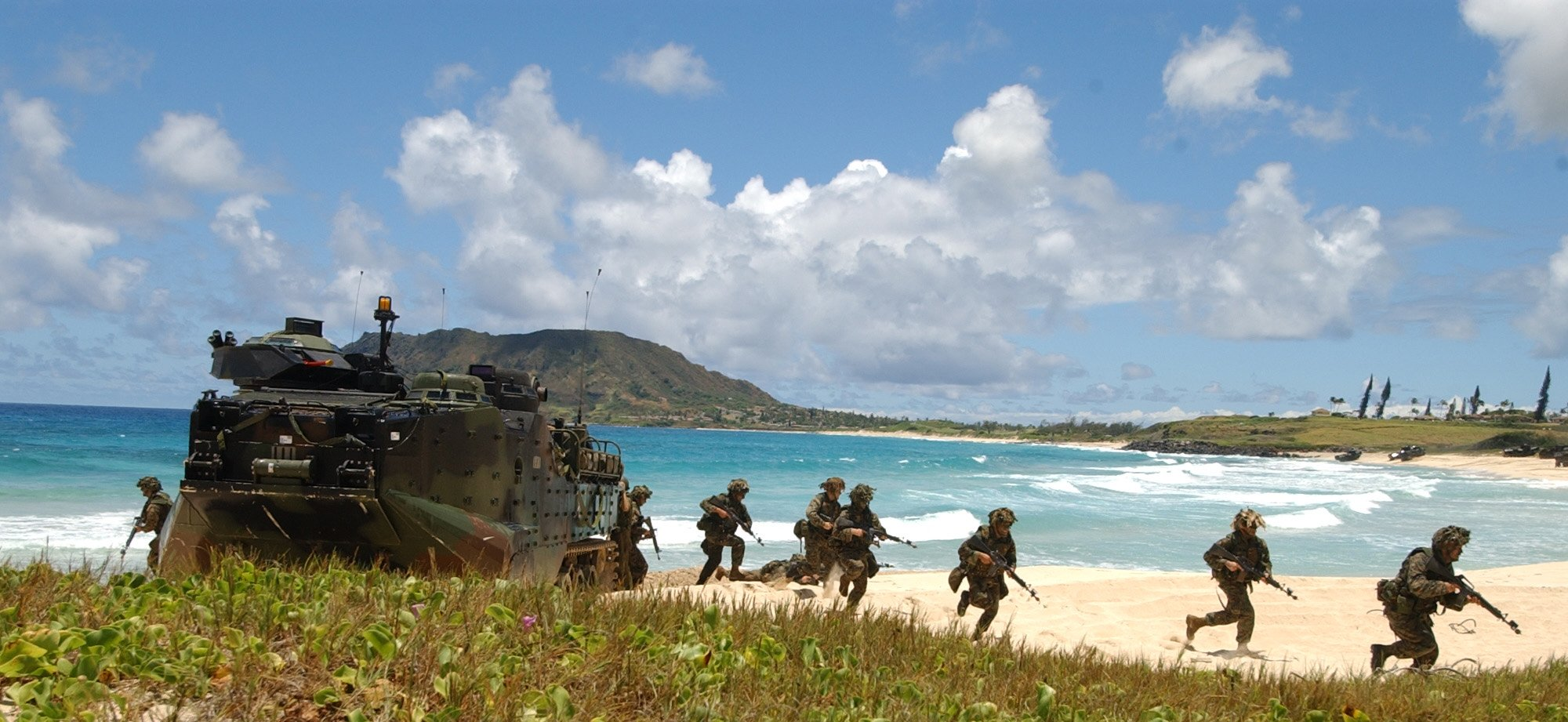
Marines from Kaneohe Bay conducting an amphibious landing in RIMPAC 2004.

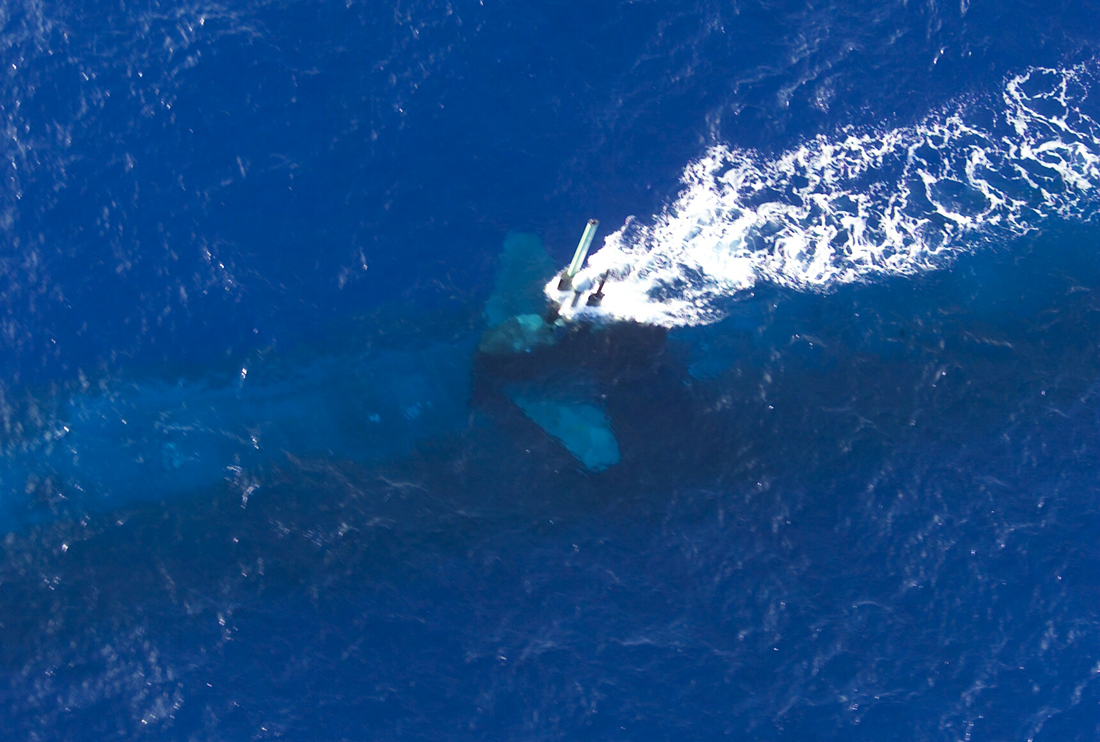
USS Key West at periscope depth, RIMPAC 2004

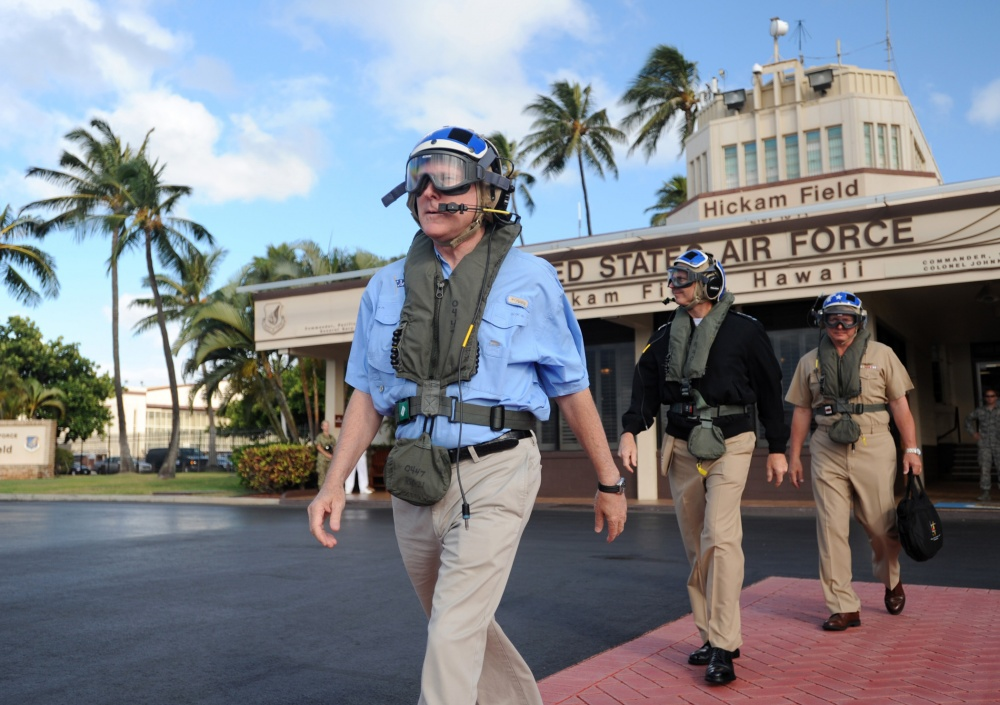
SECNAV Mabus departs Hickam to review the RIMPAC 2012 fleet

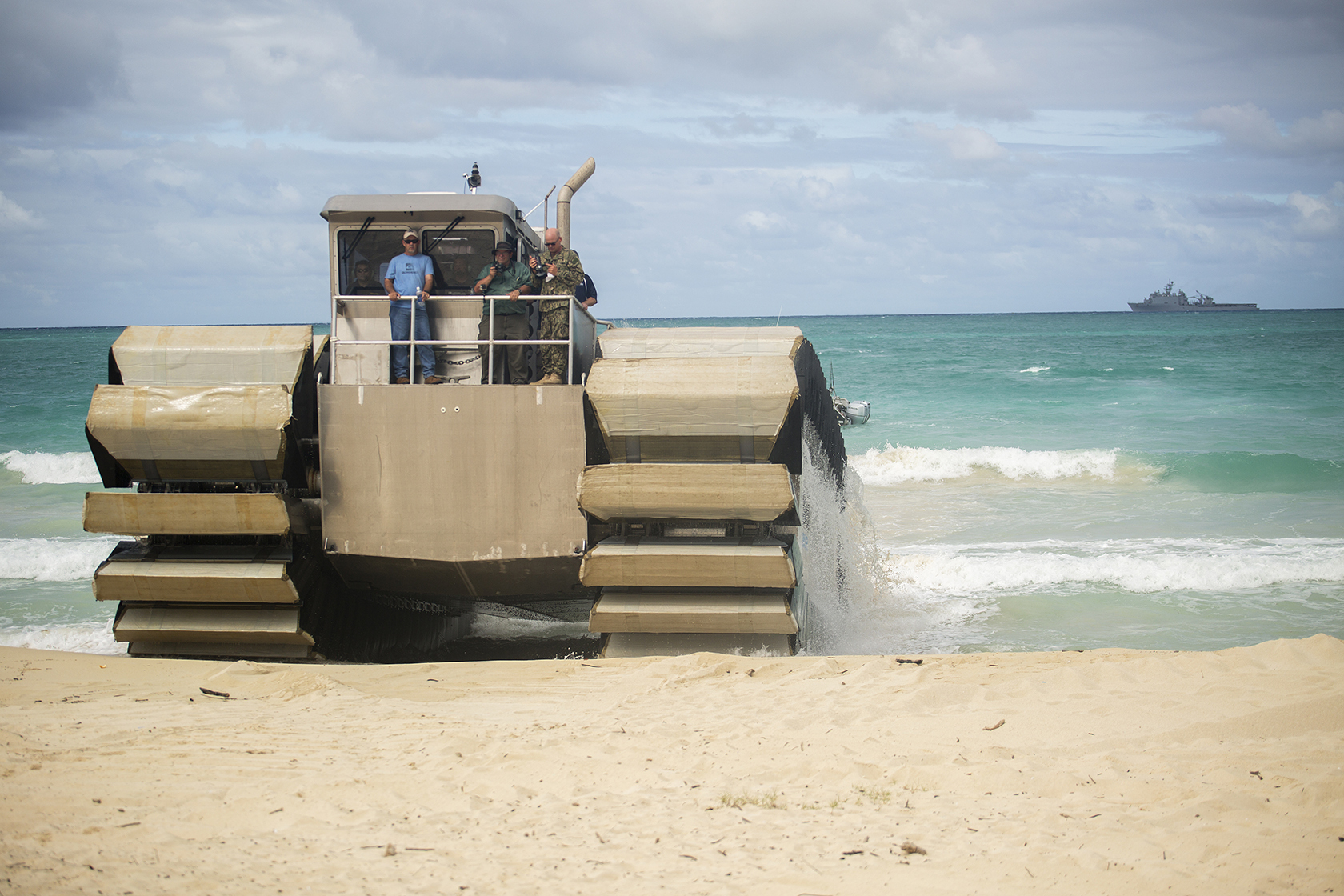
Ultra Heavy-Lift Amphibious Connector lands on the shore after disembarking USS Rushmore with heavy equipment during a Marine Corps Advanced Warfighting Experiment during RIMPAC 2014. The prototype is a ship-to-shore connector and is 50% scale.

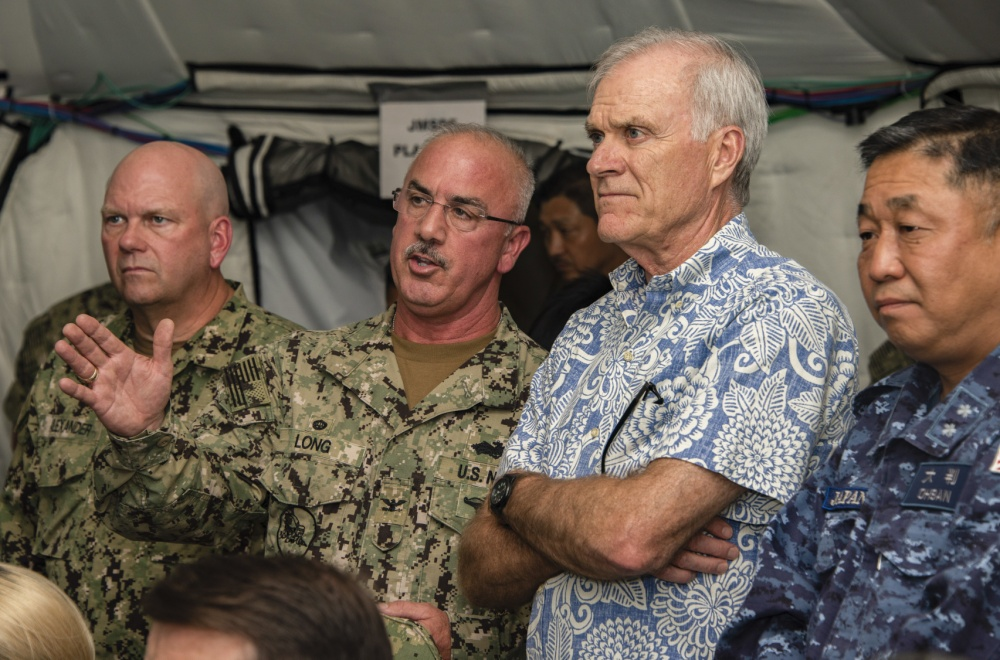
SECNAV Richard Spencer meets with RIMPAC 2018 commanders

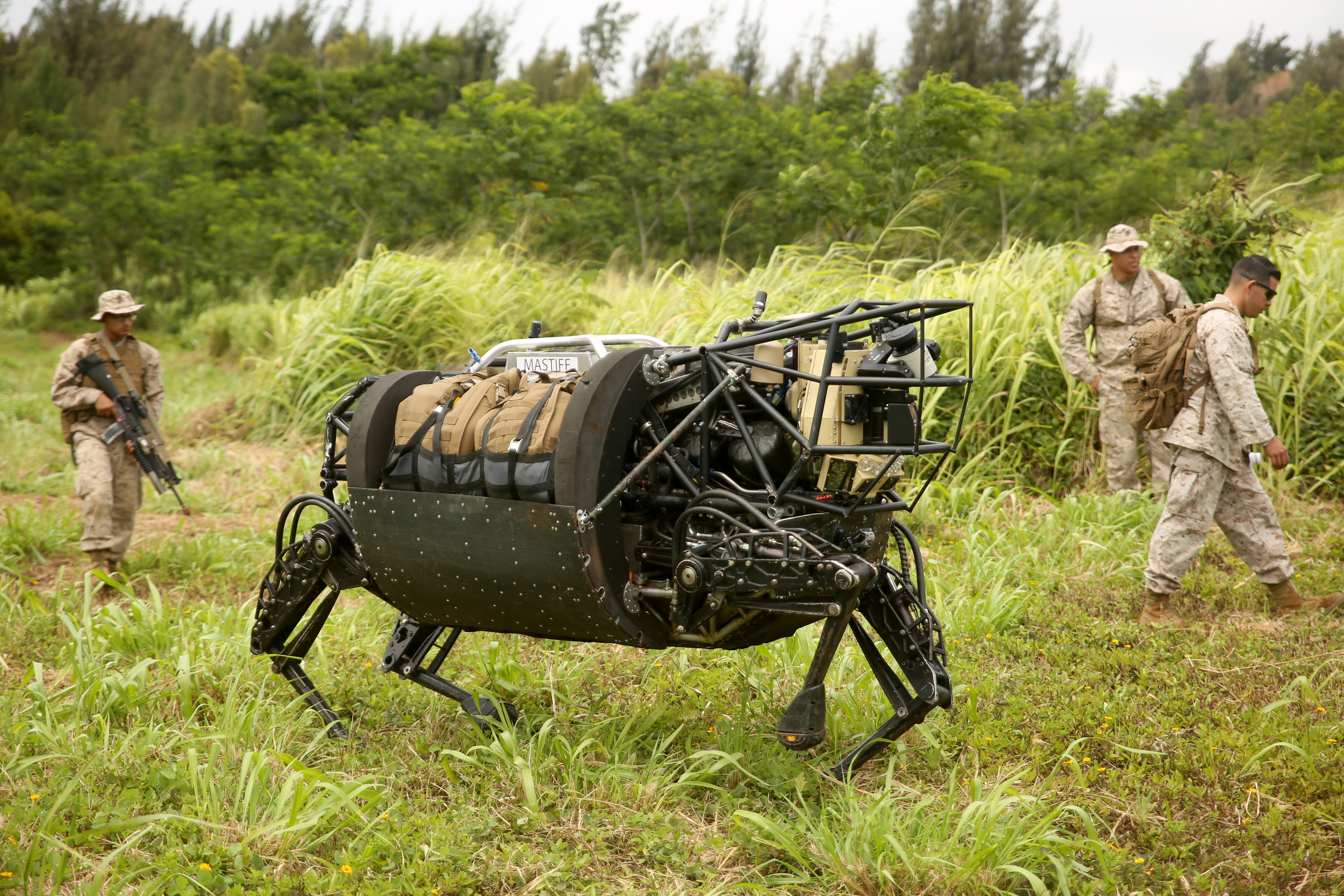
Legged Squad Support System (LS3) walks around the Kahuku Training Area during RIMPAC 2014. The LS3 is experimental technology being tested by the Marine Corps Warfighting Lab.

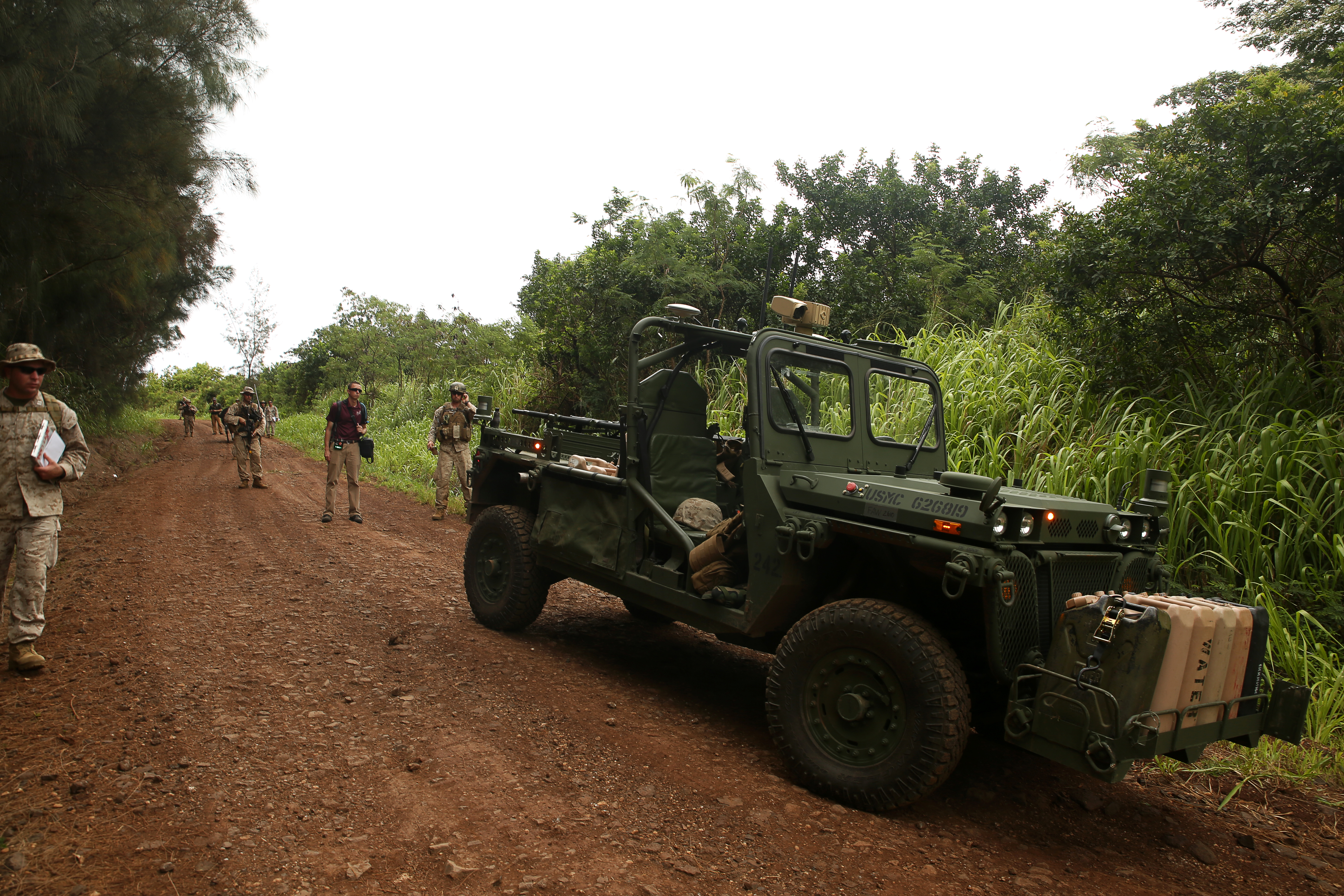
Marines follow a Ground Unmanned Support Surrogate (GUSS), experimental technology being tested by the Marine Corps Warfighting Lab during RIMPAC 2014 at Kahuku Training Area.

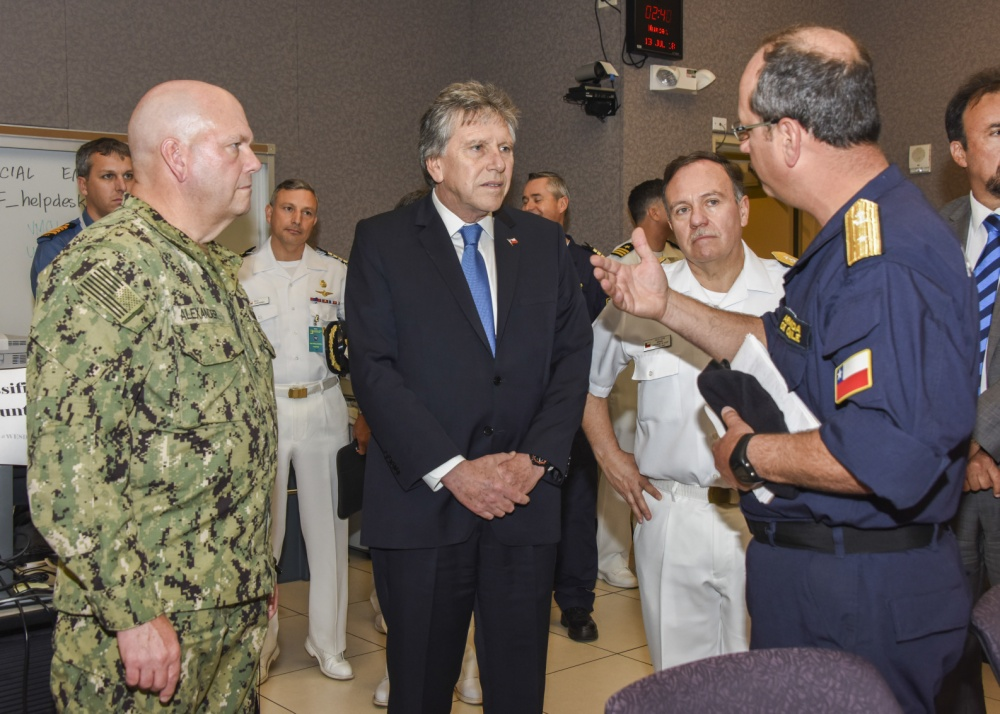
Chilean defense minister Alberto Espina participates in RIMPAC 2018

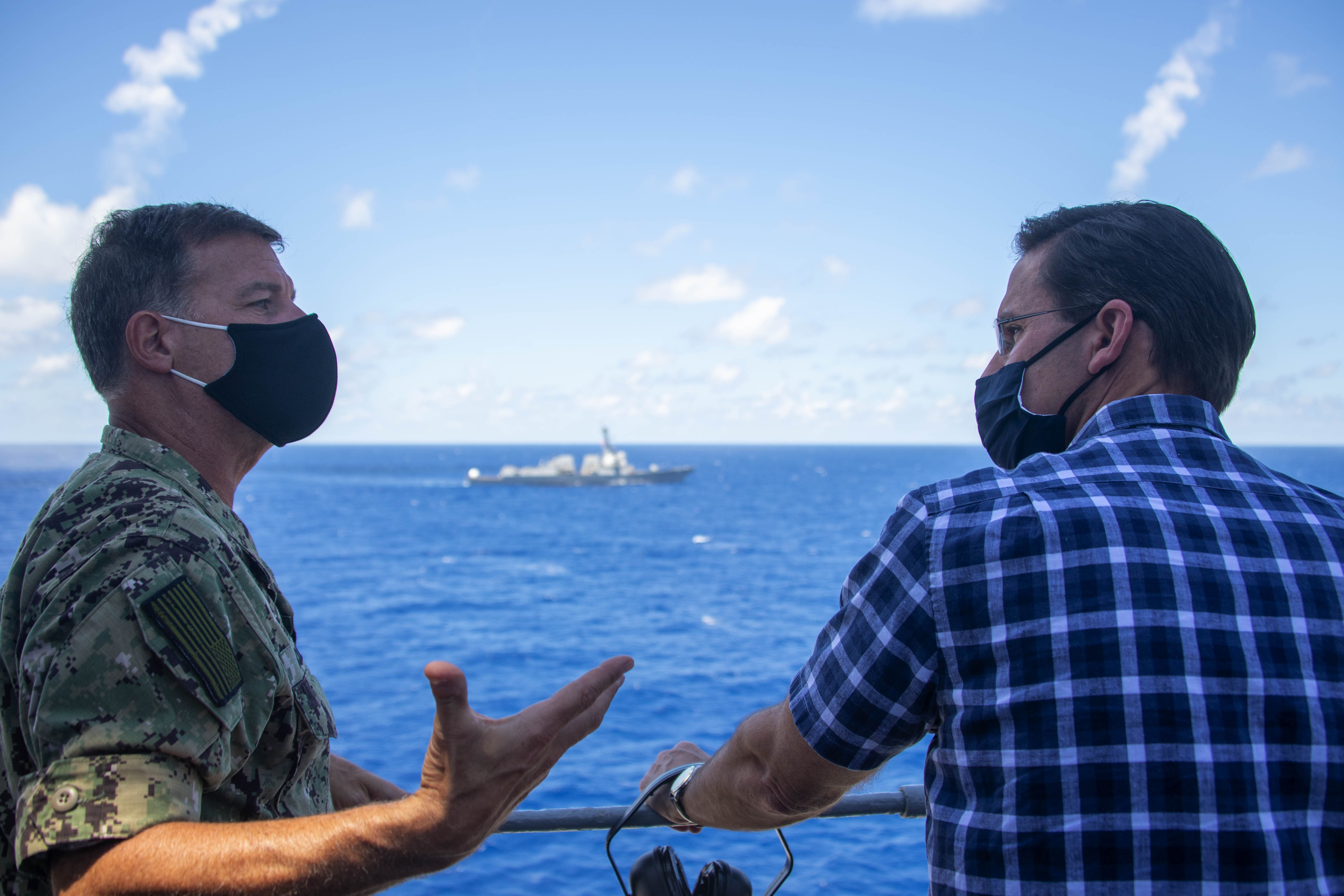
SecDef Esper with CINCPACFLT Aquilino at RIMPAC 2020
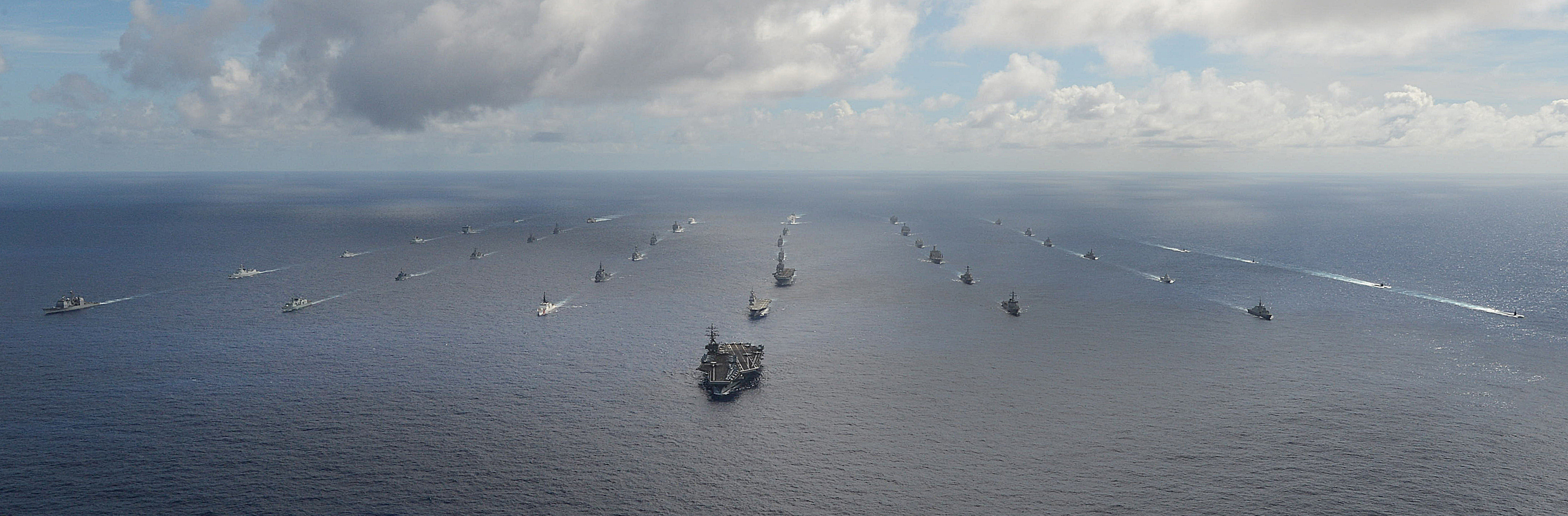
42 ships & subs from 15 nations in close formation during RIMPAC 2014

== In popular culture ==
- RIMPAC 2012 was the main setting of the 2012 film Battleship.
- The IMAX documentary film Aircraft Carrier: Guardians of the Sea covers RIMPAC 2014.
- NCIS: Hawaiʻi S2 E1 "Prisoners Dilemma" story involves RIMPAC 2022.
