= ROKS Suncheon =

ROKS Suncheon is the name of two Republic of Korea Navy warships:

- ROKS Suncheon (PCE-1002), an Auk-class minesweeper in 1967.
- ROKS Suncheon (PCC-767), a Pohang-class corvette from 1988–2019.
