= USS Frederick (LST-1184) =

Newport-class tank landing ship

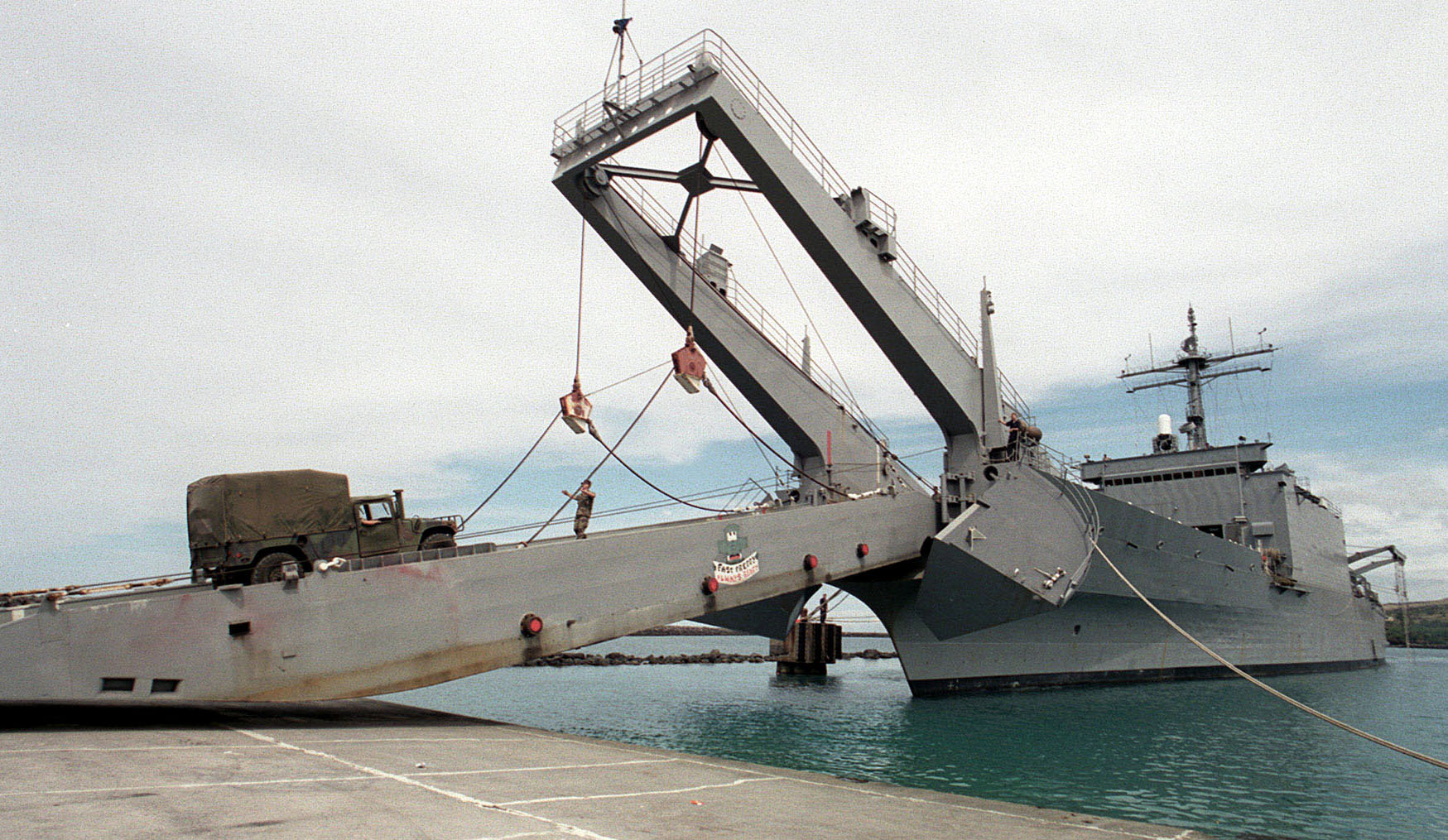
- USS Frederick with its bow ramp down

History

United States
- Name: Frederick
- Namesake: Frederick, Maryland
- Ordered: 15 July 1966
- Builder: National Steel and Shipbuilding Company
- Laid down: 13 April 1968
- Launched: 8 March 1969
- Sponsored by: Mrs. Kleber S. Masterson
- Commissioned: 11 April 1970
- Decommissioned: 5 October 2002
- Stricken: 6 November 2002
- Identification: LST-1184
- Fate: Transferred to Mexico
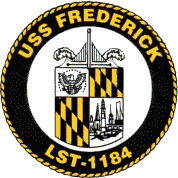
- Badge

Mexico
- Name: Usumacinta
- Namesake: Usumacinta River
- Acquired: 9 December 2002
- Commissioned: 9 December 2002
- Identification: A 412
- Status: In service

General characteristics as built
- Class & type: Newport-class tank landing ship
- Displacement: 4,793 long tons (4,870 t) light; 8,342 long tons (8,476 t) full load
- Length: 522 ft 4 in (159.2 m) oa; 562 ft (171.3 m) over derrick arms
- Beam: 69 ft 6 in (21.2 m)
- Draft: 17 ft 6 in (5.3 m) max
- Propulsion: 2 shafts; 6 Alco diesel engines (3 per shaft); 16,500 shp (12,300 kW); Bow thruster
- Speed: 22 knots (41 km/h; 25 mph) max
- Range: 2,500 nmi (4,600 km; 2,900 mi) at 14 knots (26 km/h; 16 mph)
- Troops: 431 max
- Complement: 213
- Sensors & processing systems: 2 × Mk 63 GCFS; SPS-10 radar
- Armament: 2 × twin 3-inch/50-caliber guns
- Aviation facilities: Helicopter deck

USS Frederick (LST-1184) was a Newport-class tank landing ship which replaced the traditional bow door-design tank landing ships (LSTs) of the United States Navy. The ship was named after the city of Frederick, Maryland and Frederick County, Maryland. The vessel entered service in 1970 with the United States Pacific Fleet and saw service during the Vietnam War, and the Persian Gulf War earning three battle stars. The ship was decommissioned in 2002 and put up for sale.

Frederick was acquired by the Mexican Navy the same year as part of the Security Assistance Program and entered service in December 2002 renamed ARM Usumacinta. Usumacinta has since taken part in three RIMPAC multi-national naval exercises as well as provide humanitarian support following earthquakes in Oaxaca and Chiapas.

== Design and description ==
Frederick was a Newport-class tank landing ship which were designed to meet the goal put forward by the United States amphibious forces to have a tank landing ship (LST) capable of over 20 knots (37 km/h; 23 mph). However, the traditional bow door form for LSTs would not be capable. Therefore, the designers of the Newport class came up with a design of a traditional ship hull with a 112-foot (34 m) aluminum ramp slung over the bow supported by two derrick arms. The 34-long-ton (35 t) ramp was capable of sustaining loads up to 75 long tons (76 t). This made the Newport class the first to depart from the standard LST design that had been developed in early World War II.

Frederick had a displacement of 4,793 long tons (4,870 t) when light and 8,342 long tons (8,476 t) at full load. The LST was 522 feet 4 inches (159.2 m) long overall and 562 ft (171.3 m) over the derrick arms which protruded past the bow. The vessel had a beam of 69 ft 6 in (21.2 m), a draft forward of 11 ft 5 in (3.5 m) and 17 ft 5 in (5.3 m) at the stern at full load.

Frederick was fitted with six Alco 251-C diesel engines turning two shafts, three to each shaft. The system was rated at 16,500 brake horsepower (12,300 kW) and gave the ship a maximum speed of 22 knots (41 km/h; 25 mph) for short periods and could only sustain 20 knots (37 km/h; 23 mph) for an extended length of time. The LST carried 1,750 long tons (1,780 t) of diesel fuel for a range of 2,500 nautical miles (4,600 km; 2,900 mi) at the cruising speed of 14 knots (26 km/h; 16 mph). The ship was also equipped with a bow thruster to allow for better maneuvering near causeways and to hold position while offshore during the unloading of amphibious vehicles.

The Newport class were larger and faster than previous LSTs and were able to transport tanks, heavy vehicles and engineer groups and supplies that were too large for helicopters or smaller landing craft to carry. The LSTs have a ramp forward of the superstructure that connects the lower tank deck with the main deck and a passage large enough to allow access to the parking area amidships. The vessels are also equipped with a stern gate to allow the unloading of amphibious vehicles directly into the water or to unload onto a utility landing craft (LCU) or pier. At either end of the tank deck there is a 30 ft (9.1 m) turntable that permits vehicles to turn around without having to reverse. The Newport class has the capacity for 500 long tons (510 t) of vehicles, 19,000 ft^{2} (1,800 m^{2}) of cargo area and could carry up to 431 troops. The vessels also have davits for four vehicle and personnel landing craft (LCVPs) and could carry four pontoon causeway sections along the sides of the hull.

Frederick was initially armed with four Mark 33 3-inch (76 mm)/50 caliber guns in two twin turrets. The vessel was equipped with two Mk 63 gun control fire systems (GCFS) for the 3-inch guns, but these were removed in 1977–1978. The ship also had SPS-10 surface search radar. Atop the stern gate, the vessels mounted a helicopter deck. They had a maximum complement of 213 including 11 officers.

== Construction and career ==
=== United States Navy service ===
The ship was ordered as part of a group of eight ships in Fiscal Year 1966. The LST was laid down on 13 April 1968 at San Diego, California, by the National Steel and Shipbuilding Company. Named for a city of city and county in Maryland, the vessel was launched on 8 March 1969, sponsored by Mrs. Kleber S. Masterson. Frederick was commissioned into the United States Navy on 11 April 1970.

Following shakedown, Frederick was assigned to the Amphibious Force, Pacific Fleet, and was homeported at San Diego. She made over thirteen major deployments to the Western Pacific and Far East. Frederick earned one award of the Meritorious Unit Commendation and three battle stars for Vietnam service. Frederick was decommissioned on 5 October 2002.

=== Mexican Navy service ===
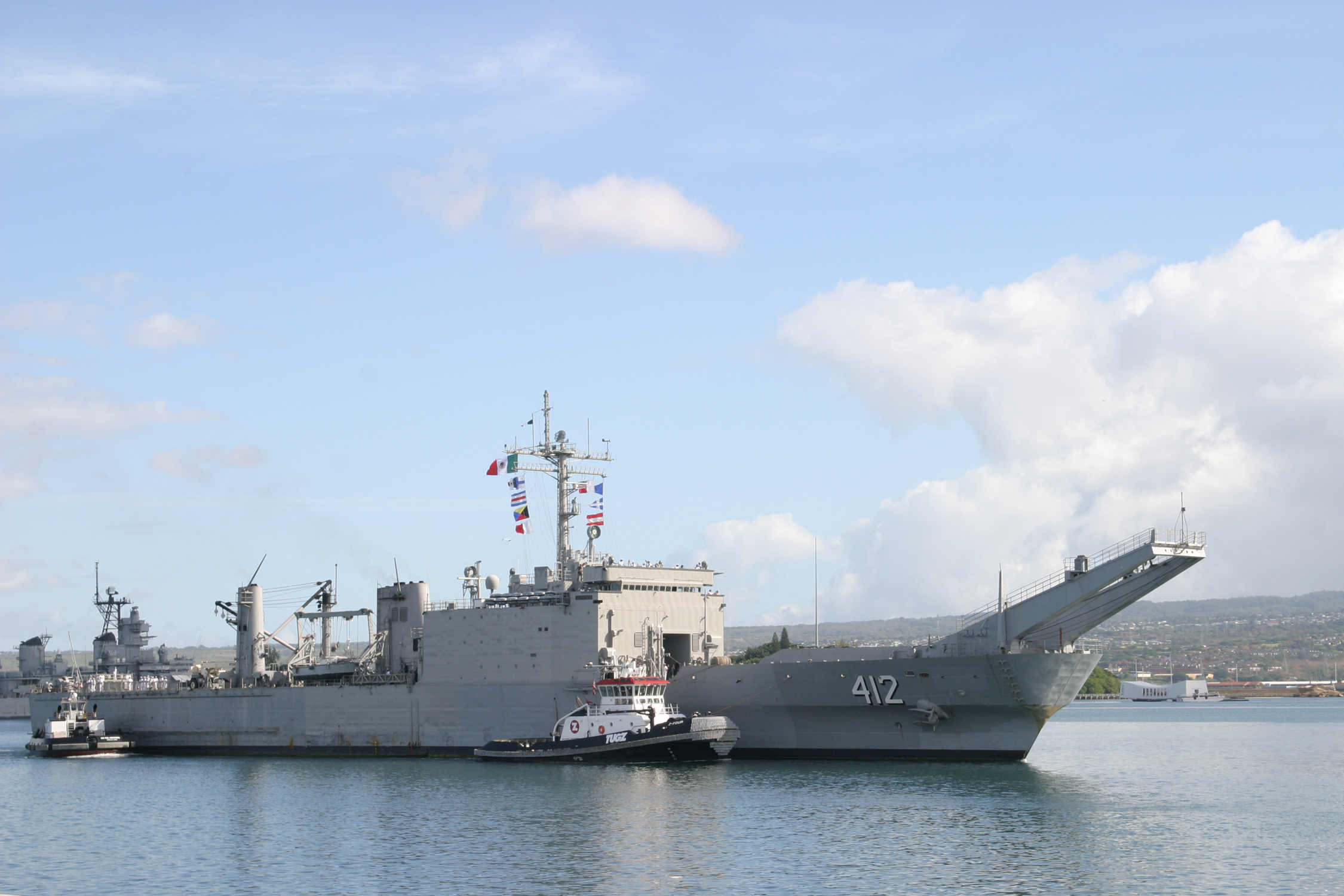
ARM Usumacinta in 2003

Frederick was sold to Mexico as part of the Security Assistance Program on 9 December 2002 and was commissioned into the Mexican Navy as ARM Usumacinta (A 412) the same day. The ship was struck from the United States Naval Vessel Register on 6 November 2002.

In 2012 ARM Usumacinta, along with a Naval Infantry detachment, took part in the large multi-national naval exercise RIMPAC 2012 off the coast of the Hawaiian Islands. The ship also took part in RIMPAC 2016 and RIMPAC 2018. In 2017, following earthquakes in Oaxaca and Chiapas, the ship was used to transport 536 long tons (545 t) of supplies to the stricken areas.

== Sources ==
- Blackman, Raymond V. B., ed. (1972). Jane's Fighting Ships 1972–73. London: Sampson Low, Marston & Company. OCLC 28197951.
- Couhat, Jean Labayle, ed. (1986). Combat Fleets of the World 1986/87. Annapolis, Maryland: Naval Institute Press. ISBN 0-85368-860-5.
- "Frederick (LST-1184)". Dictionary of American Naval Fighting Ships. Navy Department, Naval History and Heritage Command.
- Gardiner, Robert; Chumbley, Stephen & Budzbon, Przemysław, eds. (1995). Conway's All the World's Fighting Ships 1947–1995. Annapolis, Maryland: Naval Institute Press. ISBN 1-55750-132-7.
- Moore, John, ed. (1974). Jane's Fighting Ships 1974–75 (77th ed.). New York: Franklin Watts Incorporated. ISBN 0-531-02743-0.
- Moore, John, ed. (1975). Jane's Fighting Ships 1975–76 (78th ed.). New York: Franklin Watts Incorporated. ISBN 0-531-03251-5.
- Moore, John, ed. (1976). Jane's Fighting Ships 1976–77 (79th ed.). New York: Franklin Watts Incorporated. ISBN 0-531-03261-2.
- Moore, John, ed. (1978). Jane's Fighting Ships 1978–79 (81st ed.). New York: Franklin Watts Incorporated. ISBN 0-531-03297-3.
- Sharpe, Richard, ed. (1990). Jane's Fighting Ships 1990–91 (93 ed.). Surrey, United Kingdom: Jane's Information Group. ISBN 0-7106-0904-3.
- Saunders, Stephen, ed. (2004). Jane's Fighting Ships 2004–2005 (107 ed.). Alexandria, Virginia: Jane's Information Group Inc. ISBN 0-7106-2623-1.
