= USNS Washington Chambers =

Cargo ship of the United States Navy

USNS Washington Chambers (T-AKE-11)
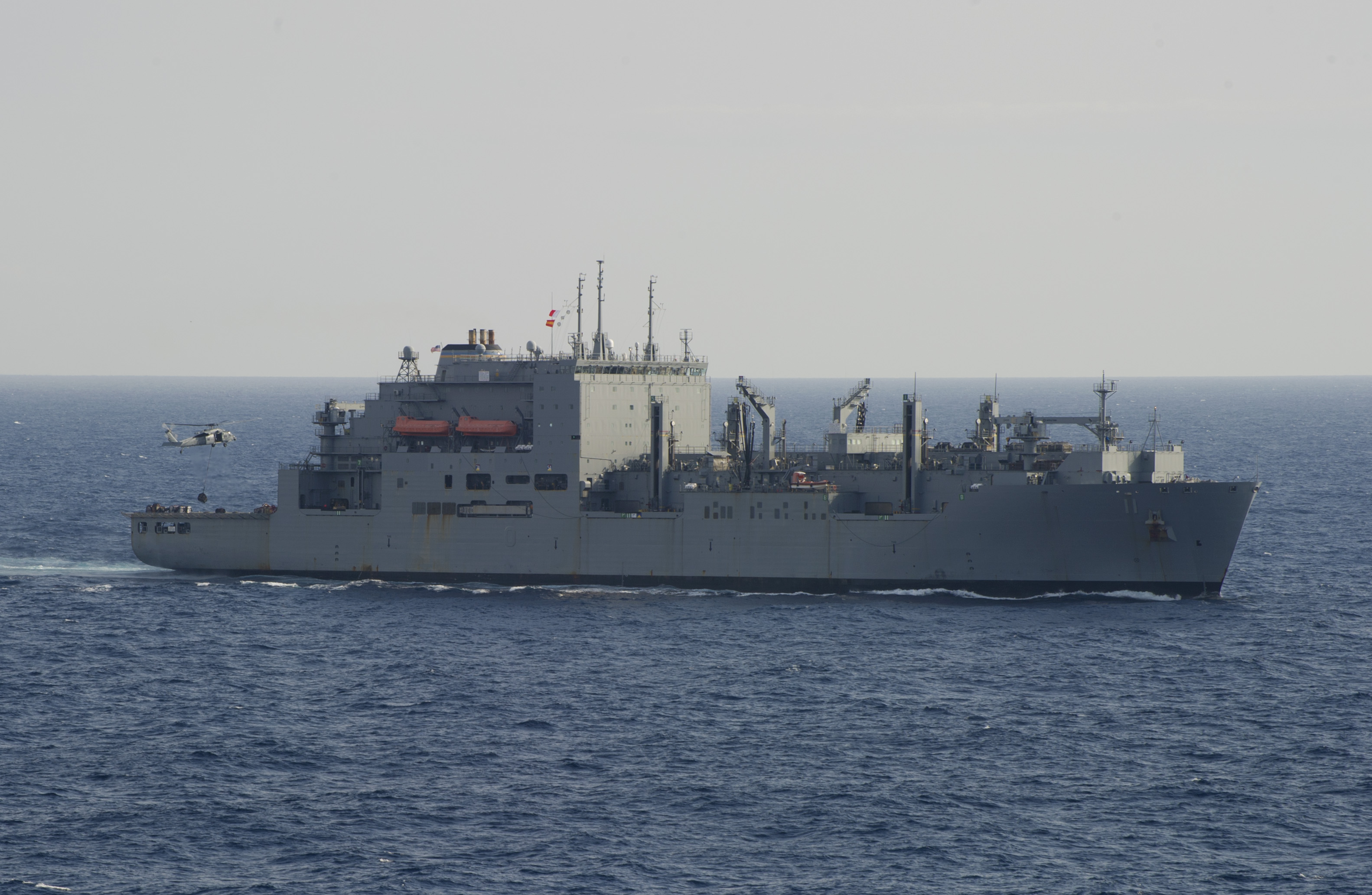
- USNS Washington Chambers (T-AKE-11) in October 2014

History
- Namesake: Washington Chambers
- Awarded: 12 December 2008
- Builder: National Steel and Shipbuilding
- Laid down: 25 August 2009
- Launched: 11 September 2010
- Sponsored by: Loretta Penn
- Christened: 11 September 2010
- In service: 23 February 2011
- Identification: IMO number: 9551997; MMSI number: 367276000; Callsign: NCHA
- Status: in active service
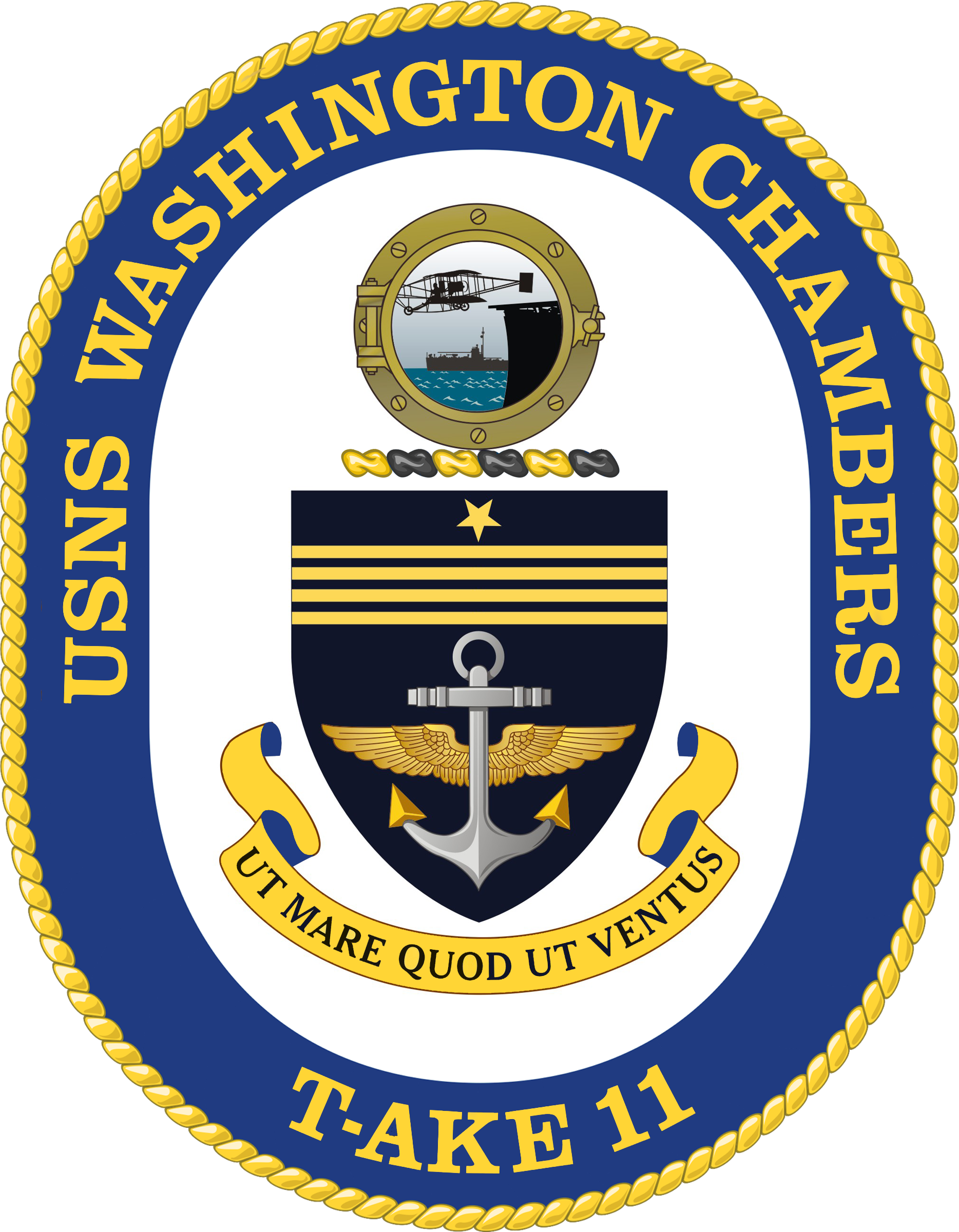
- Badge

General characteristics
- Class & type: Lewis and Clark-class dry cargo ship
- Displacement: 23,852 tons light; 40,298 tons full; 16,446 tons dead
- Length: 210 m (689 ft) overall; 199.3 m (654 ft) waterline
- Beam: 32.3 m (106 ft) extreme; 32.3 m (106 ft) waterline
- Draft: 9.1 m (30 ft) maximum, 9.4 m (31 ft) limit
- Propulsion: Integrated propulsion and ship service electrical system, with generation at 6.6 kV by FM/MAN B&W diesel generators; one fixed pitch propeller; bow thruster
- Speed: 20 knots (37 km/h)
- Range: 14,000 nmi (26,000 km; 16,000 mi) at 20 knots (37 km/h; 23 mph)
- Capacity: Max dry cargo weight: 5,910 long tons (6,000 t); Max dry cargo volume:783,000 cu ft (22,200 m^{3}); Max cargo fuel weight: 2,350 long tons (2,390 t); Cargo fuel volume: 18,000 imp bbl (2,900 m^{3}); (DFM: 10,500) (JP5: 7,500)
- Complement: 49 military, 123 civilian
- Electronic warfare & decoys: Nulka decoy launchers
- Armament: 2–6 × 0.5 in (12.7 mm) machine guns; or 7.62 mm medium machine guns
- Aircraft carried: 2 × helicopters, either Sikorsky MH-60S Knighthawk or Aerospatiale SA330J Puma

USNS Washington Chambers (T-AKE-11) is a Lewis and Clark-class dry cargo ship of the United States Navy, named in honor of Captain Washington Chambers (1856–1934), a pioneer in US naval aviation.

== Construction ==
The contract to build Washington Chambers was awarded to National Steel and Shipbuilding Company on 12 December 2008. Her keel was laid down on 25 August 2009. Washington Chambers was launched and christened on 11 September 2010 sponsored by Loretta Penn, wife of former Acting Secretary of the Navy, B.J. Penn. Washington Chambers was delivered to the US Navy's Military Sealift Command on 23 February 2011, following a series of tests and sea trials.

== Operational history ==
The ship delivers ammunition, provisions, spare parts, potable water and petroleum products to US Navy and other navy ships at sea, allowing them to remain underway and combat ready for extended periods of time.
