= BAP Guise (CC-28) =

Pohang-class corvette

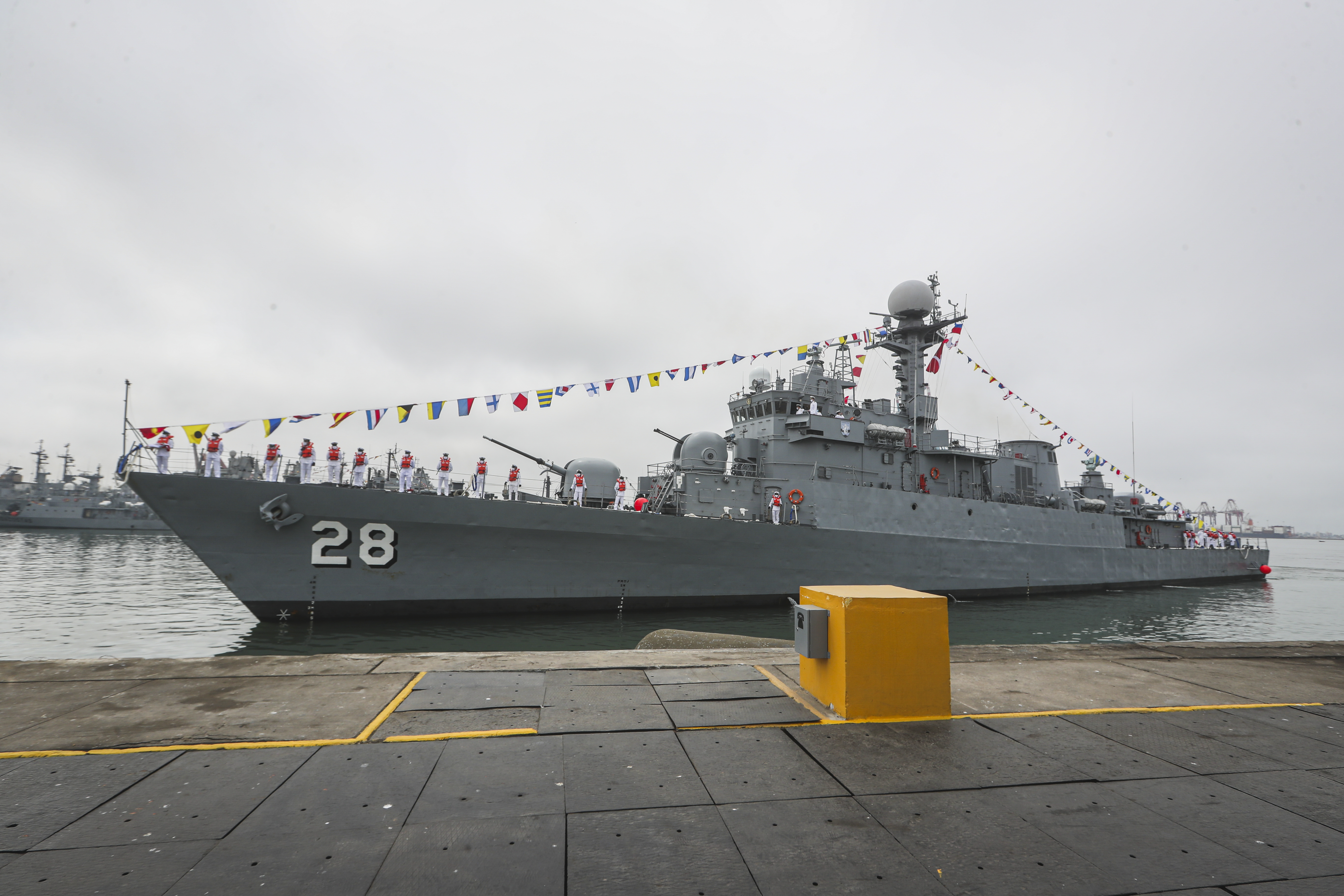
- BAP Guise at Callao Port on 5 January 2022

History

South Korea
- Name: Suncheon; (순천)
- Namesake: Suncheon
- Builder: Hanjin, Busan
- Launched: 3 April 1987
- Commissioned: 30 September 1988
- Decommissioned: 24 December 2019
- Identification: Pennant number: PCC-767
- Fate: Transferred to the Peruvian Navy

Peru
- Name: Guise
- Namesake: Martin George Guisse
- Operator: Peruvian Navy
- Acquired: 2021
- Commissioned: January 2022
- Home port: Callao
- Identification: Pennant number: CC-28
- Status: Active

General characteristics
- Class & type: Pohang-class corvette
- Displacement: 1,220 tons
- Length: 289.7 ft (88 m)
- Beam: 33 ft (10 m)
- Draft: 2.9 m (9 ft 6 in)
- Installed power: 2 × MTU 6V396 TC52 diesel generators
- Propulsion: Combined diesel or gas (CODOG) arrangement: 2 × MTU 12V956 TB82 diesel engines producing combined total of 6,260 shp (4,670 kW); 1 × General Electric LM2500 PB gas turbines generating 27,820 shp (20,700 kW)
- Speed: 32 knots (59 km/h; 37 mph) maximum
- Range: 4,000 nmi (7,400 km; 4,600 mi) at 15 knots (28 km/h; 17 mph) using diesel engines
- Endurance: 20 days
- Boats & landing craft carried: 2 × RHIB
- Crew: 118
- Sensors & processing systems: X-band & S-band navigational radars; Raytheon AN/SPS-64(V)5B surface search radar; Signaal (Thales Nederland) WM-28 Fire Control System; Signaal (Thales Nederland) LIOD optronic director; Raytheon AN/SQS-58 hull mounted passive/active sonar
- Electronic warfare & decoys: 2 × Loral Hycor Mk 34 RBOC Chaff and Decoy Launching System
- Armament: 2 × Oto Melara 76 mm/62 caliber Compact naval guns; 2 × Otobreda 40mm L/70 twin naval guns; 2 × Mk 32 triple torpedo tubes; 2 × Mk 9 Depth Charge Racks; 6 × M2HB Browning .50 caliber machine guns

BAP Guise (CC-28), or formerly known as ROKS Suncheon (PCC-767) is a Pohang-class corvette under the Peruvian Navy.

== Development and design ==
The Pohang class is a series of corvettes built by different Korean shipbuilding companies. The class consists of 24 ships and some after decommissioning were sold or given to other countries. There are five different types of designs in the class from Flight II to Flight VI.

== Construction and career ==
Suncheon was launched on 8 April 1987 by Hanjin Heavy Industries in Busan. The vessel was commissioned on 30 September 1988 and decommissioned on 24 December 2019.

The ship was transferred to Peru in 2021 and was commissioned in January 2022 as the BAP Guise.

On 17 July 2022, two sailors were critically injured after a fire broke out in the engine room of the Guise while the ship was participating in the 2022 RIMPAC exercise. The fire was extinguished and the injured sailors were transferred to Honolulu for medical treatment.
