= USS Chung-Hoon =

Arleigh-Burke class destroyer

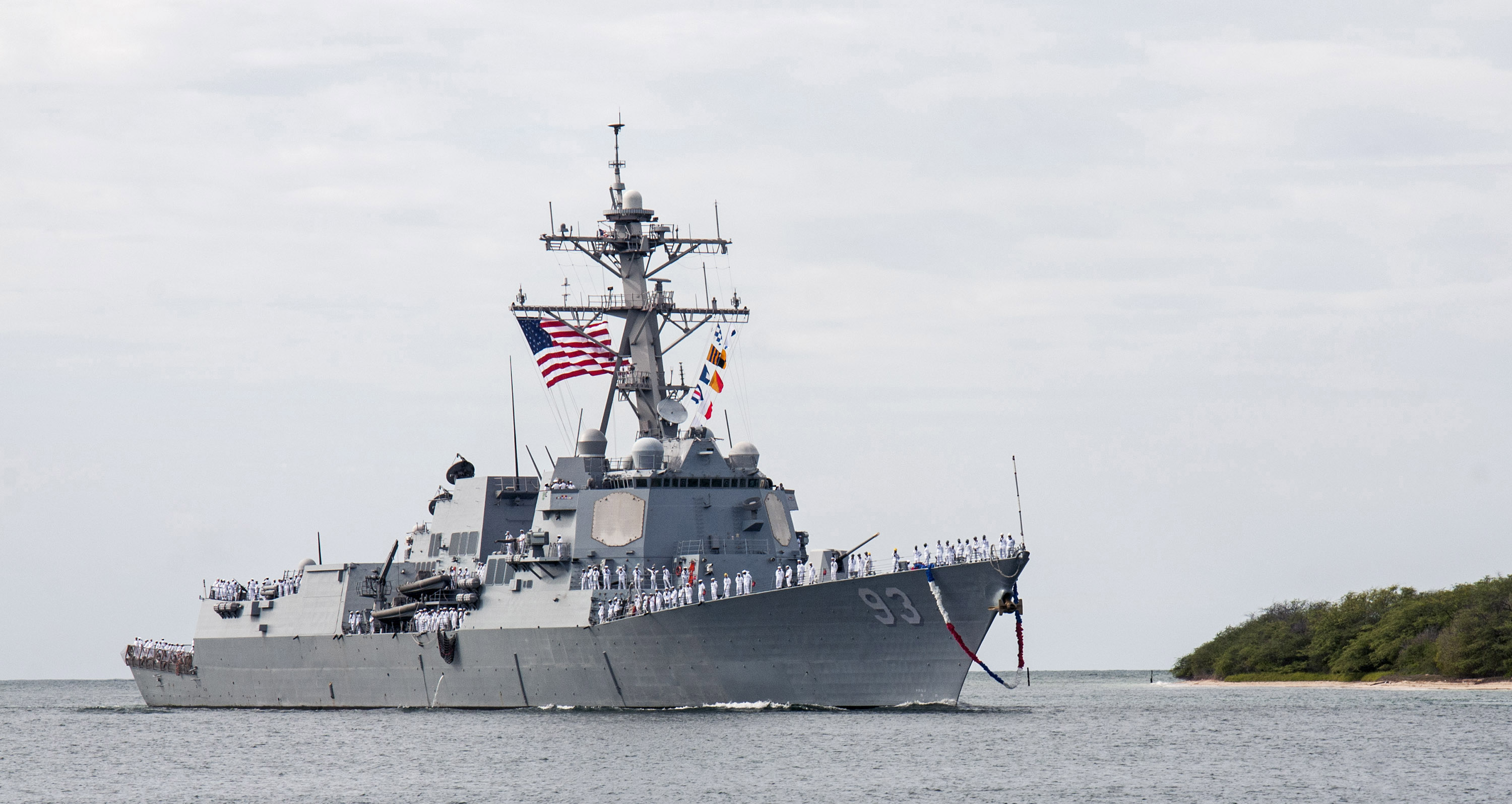
- USS Chung-Hoon on 2 October 2013

History

United States
- Name: Chung-Hoon
- Namesake: Gordon Pai'ea Chung-Hoon
- Awarded: 6 March 1998
- Builder: Ingalls Shipbuilding division of Northrop Grumman, Pascagoula, Mississippi
- Laid down: 14 January 2002
- Launched: 15 December 2002
- Sponsored by: Michelle Punana Chung-Hoon
- Acquired: 22 March 2004
- Commissioned: 18 September 2004
- Home port: San Diego
- Identification: MMSI number: 369952000; Callsign: NGPC; Hull number: DDG-93
- Motto: Imua e na Koa Kai; (Go Forward Sea Warriors)
- Status: in active service
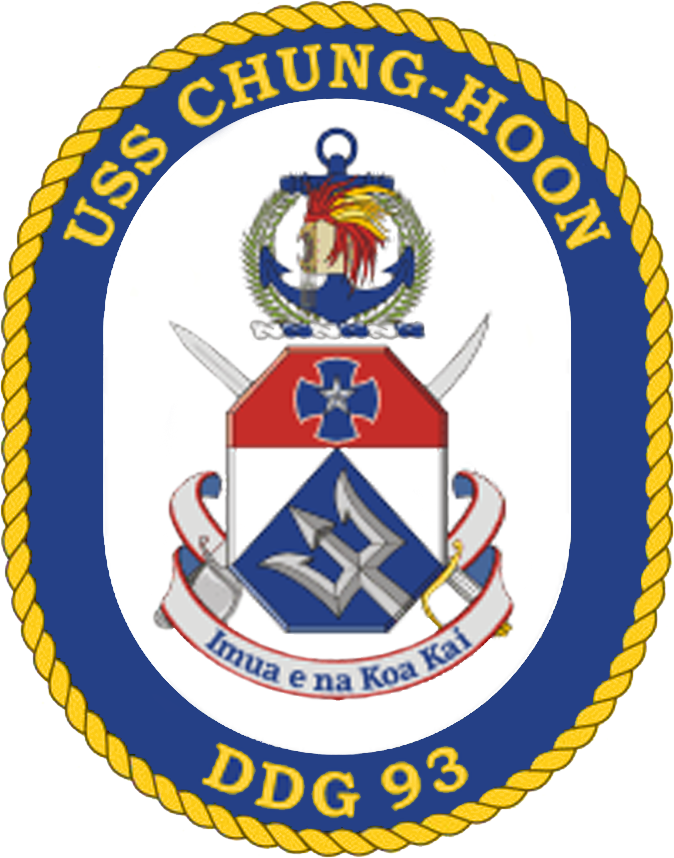
- Badge

General characteristics
- Class & type: Arleigh Burke-class destroyer
- Displacement: 9,200 tons
- Length: 509 ft 6 in (155.30 m)
- Beam: 66 ft (20 m)
- Draft: 31 ft (9.4 m)
- Propulsion: 4 × General Electric LM2500-30 gas turbines, 2 shafts, 100,000 shp (75 MW)
- Speed: 30 kn (56 km/h)
- Complement: 380 officers and enlisted
- Electronic warfare & decoys: SLQ-32(V)7 (SEWIP Block 3)
- Armament: Guns: 1 × 5-inch (127 mm)/62 Mk 45 Mod 4 (lightweight gun); 1 × 20 mm (0.8 in) Phalanx CIWS; 2 × 25 mm (0.98 in) Mk 38 machine gun system; 4 × 0.50 in (12.7 mm) caliber guns; Missiles: 1 × 32-cell, 1 × 64-cell (96 total cells) Mk 41 vertical launching system (VLS): RIM-66M surface-to-air missile; RIM-156 surface-to-air missile; RIM-174A Standard ERAM; RIM-161 anti-ballistic missile; RIM-162 ESSM (quad-packed); BGM-109 Tomahawk cruise missile; RUM-139 vertical launch ASROC; Torpedoes: 2 × Mark 32 triple torpedo tubes: Mark 46 lightweight torpedo; Mark 50 lightweight torpedo; Mark 54 lightweight torpedo
- Aircraft carried: 2 × MH-60R Seahawk helicopters

USS Chung-Hoon (DDG-93) is an Arleigh Burke-class (Flight IIA) Aegis guided missile destroyer serving in the United States Navy (USN). Chung-Hoon was named in honor of Rear Admiral Gordon Pai'ea Chung-Hoon (1910–1979), recipient of the Navy Cross and the Silver Star.

The contract to build her was awarded to Northrop Grumman Ship Systems on 6 March 1998, and her keel was laid down on 14 January 2002, at Ingalls Shipbuilding, Incorporated. She was launched on 11 January 2003, sponsored by Michelle Punana Chung-Hoon of Honolulu, Hawaii, Chung-Hoon's niece, and commissioned on 18 September 2004.

She is part of the Pacific Fleet and homeported in San Diego, California.

== Service history ==
A Chinese warship cut across the bow of Chung-Hoon on 3 June 2023

In October 2005 while operating 360 nautical miles (670 km) northeast of Kahului, Chung-Hoon responded to a distress call from the bulk freighter C-Laurel. Chung-Hoon provided emergency medical care until the ship was within range of Coast Guard aircraft.

In September 2006 Chung-Hoon served as host ship to the Chinese People's Liberation Army Navy's (PLAN) Luhu-class destroyer Qingdao during Qingdao's visit to Pearl Harbor. The two ships conducted communications and mobility exercises on 10 September 2006. According to Xinhua News Agency, it was the first such exercise by USN and PLAN ships and the first visit by a Chinese navy ship to a U.S. state in six years.

On 20 January 2009 Chung-Hoon departed Pearl Harbor for a scheduled deployment with the Boxer Expeditionary Strike Group.

On 8 March 2009 Chung-Hoon was escorting the surveillance vessel USNS Impeccable after the latter was involved in an incident with Chinese vessels in waters 75 miles (121 km) south of Hainan.

In 2010 the ship assisted the Philippine Navy in the Sulu Sea in operations against Islamic militants. After returning to Pearl Harbor, the ship redeployed to the western Pacific beginning on 1 June 2011.

The Republic of Singapore Navy ships RSS Vigour, RSS Stalwart and RSS Supreme conducted joint exercise CARAT 2011 with Chung-Hoon on 23 August 2011.

On 27 January 2016 the ship deployed on a regularly scheduled Western Pacific deployment with the USS John C. Stennis Strike Group, the so-called Great Green Fleet.

On 5 January 2023 Chung-Hoon, while deployed to the U.S. Seventh Fleet, sailed through the Taiwan Strait. She then conducted underway training with BRP Conrado Yap of the Philippine Navy on 17 April 2023.

On 3 June 2023, People's Liberation Army Navy warship Suzhou cut across the bow of Chung-Hoon while it was transiting the Taiwan Strait together with HMCS Montréal; the closest point of approach was 150 yards (140 m).

On 6 August 2023, Chung-Hoon and three other destroyers responded to a joint Chinese-Russian patrol in international waters near Alaska. The Chinese-Russian flotilla left without incident.

On April 21 2026, Chung-Hoon was spotted in the San Diego harbor en-route to sea trials with the SEWIP Block 3 EW suite fitted to both sides of her superstructure as part of the Arleigh Burke-class (Flight IIA) modernization upgrade to implement Mod 2.0 upgrades. She is the second ship to receive such upgrades following USS Pinckney.

== Awards ==
- Battle "E" – (2023)
- Secretary of the Navy Safety Excellence Award - (2016)

== In popular culture ==
In the novel 2034, written by Elliot Ackerman and Admiral James G. Stavridis, Chung-Hoon is one of two US ships sunk in a naval battle that sparks World War III.
