= USS John Paul Jones (DDG-53) =

Arleigh Burke-class destroyer

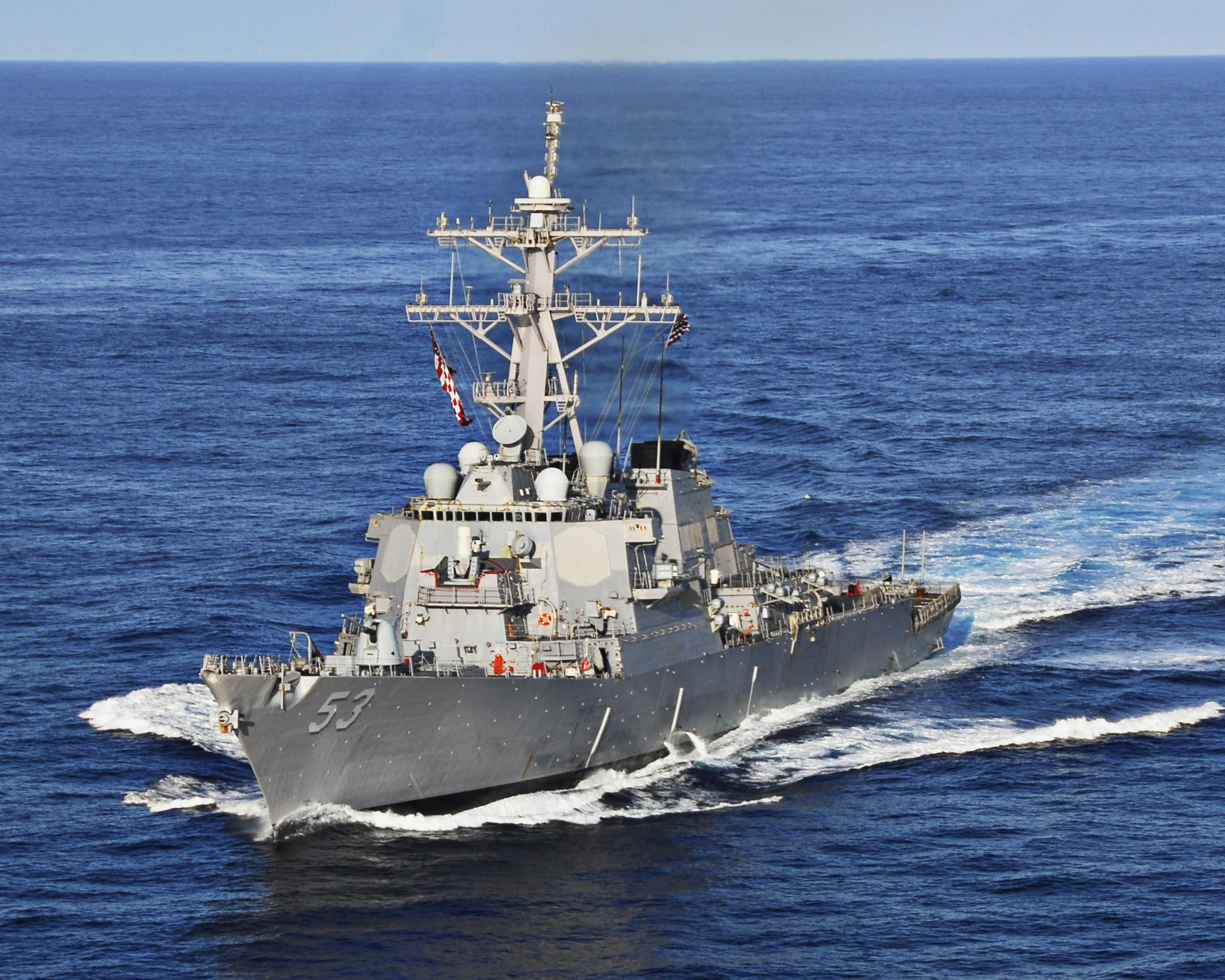
- USS John Paul Jones (DDG-53)

History

United States
- Name: John Paul Jones
- Namesake: John Paul Jones
- Ordered: 25 September 1987
- Awarded: 25 September 1987
- Builder: Bath Iron Works
- Laid down: 8 August 1990
- Launched: 26 October 1991
- Commissioned: 18 December 1993
- Home port: Everett
- Identification: MMSI number: 338807000; Callsign: NNJP; Hull number: DDG-53
- Motto: In Harm's Way
- Status: in active service
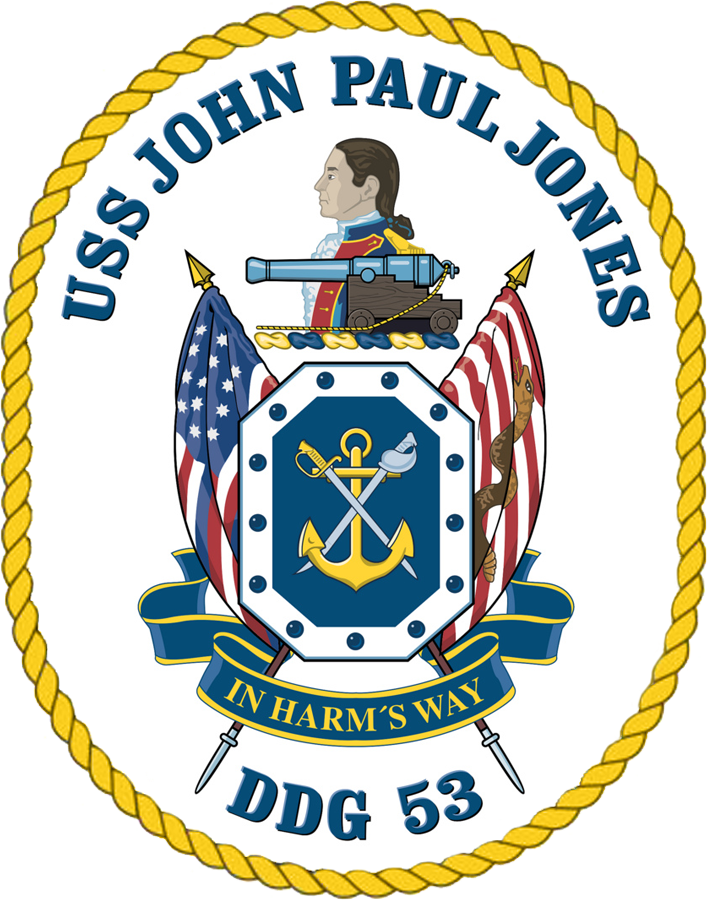
- Badge

General characteristics
- Class & type: Arleigh Burke-class destroyer
- Displacement: Light: approx. 6,800 long tons (6,900 t); Full: approx. 8,900 long tons (9,000 t)
- Length: 505 ft (154 m)
- Beam: 59 ft (18 m)
- Draft: 31 ft (9.4 m)
- Installed power: 4 × General Electric LM2500-30 gas turbines; 100,000 shp (75,000 kW)
- Propulsion: 2 × shafts
- Speed: In excess of 30 kn (56 km/h; 35 mph)
- Range: 4,400 nmi (8,100 km; 5,100 mi) at 20 kn (37 km/h; 23 mph)
- Complement: 33 commissioned officers; 38 chief petty officers; 210 enlisted personnel
- Sensors & processing systems: AN/SPY-1D PESA 3D radar (Flight I, II, IIA); AN/SPY-6(V)1 AESA 3D radar (Flight III); AN/SPS-67(V)3 or (V)5 surface search radar (DDG-51 – DDG-118); AN/SPQ-9B surface search radar (DDG-119 onward); AN/SPS-73(V)12 surface search/navigation radar (DDG-51 – DDG-86); BridgeMaster E surface search/navigation radar (DDG-87 onward); 3 × AN/SPG-62 fire-control radar; Mk 46 optical sight system (Flight I, II, IIA); Mk 20 electro-optical sight system (Flight III); AN/SQQ-89 ASW combat system: AN/SQS-53C sonar array; AN/SQR-19 tactical towed array sonar (Flight I, II, IIA); TB-37U multi-function towed array sonar (DDG-113 onward); AN/SQQ-28 LAMPS III shipboard system
- Electronic warfare & decoys: AN/SLQ-32 electronic warfare suite; AN/SLQ-25 Nixie torpedo countermeasures; Mk 36 Mod 12 decoy launching systems; Mk 53 Nulka decoy launching systems; Mk 59 decoy launching systems
- Armament: Guns: 1 × 5-inch (127 mm)/54 mk 45 mod 1/2 (lightweight gun); 2 × 20 mm (0.8 in) Phalanx CIWS; 2 × 25 mm (0.98 in) Mk 38 machine gun system; 4 × 0.50 inches (12.7 mm) caliber guns; Missiles: 2 × Mk 141 Harpoon anti-ship missile launcher; 1 × 29-cell, 1 × 61-cell (90 total cells) Mk 41 vertical launching system (VLS): RIM-66M surface-to-air missile; RIM-156 surface-to-air missile; RIM-161 anti-ballistic missile; BGM-109 Tomahawk cruise missile; RUM-139 vertical launch ASROC; Torpedoes: 2 × Mark 32 triple torpedo tubes: Mark 46 lightweight torpedo; Mark 50 lightweight torpedo; Mark 54 lightweight torpedo
- Aircraft carried: 1 × Sikorsky MH-60R

USS John Paul Jones (DDG-53) is an Arleigh Burke-class guided missile destroyer in the United States Navy. She is the fifth ship named after American Revolutionary War naval captain John Paul Jones and the second to carry his first name. She was built at Bath Iron Works in Bath, Maine. The ship is part of Destroyer Squadron 9 of Carrier Strike Group 11, which is headed by the nuclear-powered aircraft carrier USS Nimitz.

== Design ==
John Paul Jones is 505 feet (154 m) long, has a beam of 59 feet (18 m), and has a draft of 31 feet (9.4 m). She displaces 8,300 tons at full load. She is powered by four General Electric LM2500 gas turbines each generating 26,250 bhp (19,570 kW), driving two shafts, each with a five-bladed variable-pitch propeller. The propellers along with two rudders are used for steering. Rated at 100,000 shaft horsepower (75,000 kW), she has a top speed of 30 knots (56.3 km/h; 35 mph). She has a cruising range of 4,400 nmi (8,100 km; 5,100 mi) at 20 knots (37 km/h; 23 mph). A single Sikorsky MH-60R can be carried on the helipad located at the stern for anti-submarine warfare. Her complement consists of 303 officers, men, and women.

The ship's main armament consists of 90 Mk 41 Mod 2 VLS cells, with 29 cells located forward, and 61 cells located aftward. A wide array of missiles can be fired from each cell, with surface-to-air missiles (SAMs), land attack missiles (LAMs), anti-ship missiles (AShMs), and anti-submarine missiles used for ASW. Some missiles, such as the RIM-162 ESSM, can be quad-packed, so four can be loaded into a single VLS cell. Two Mk 141 Harpoon AShM launchers are located forward of the aft VLS block, each capable of firing four Harpoons. A 5-inch/54-caliber Mark 45 gun mod 1/2 gun is located near the bow and provides limited anti-surface warfare and anti-air warfare capabilities. Two 20 mm Phalanx CIWS are mounted on the centerline, with one forward, and one aftward. Two Mark 32 triple torpedo tubes, capable of firing a wide array of anti-submarine torpedoes, are located on each side of the ship. Two Mark 38 25 mm machine gun systems and four M2 Browning machine guns are fitted to primarily counter fast attack craft.

The ship is named in honor of John Paul Jones and derives her motto from his words: "I wish to have no connection with any ship that does not sail fast, for I intend to go in harm's way."

== Service history ==
Construction of John Paul Jones began on 8 August 1990, at Bath Iron Works in Bath, Maine. The ship was christened and launched on 26 October 1991.

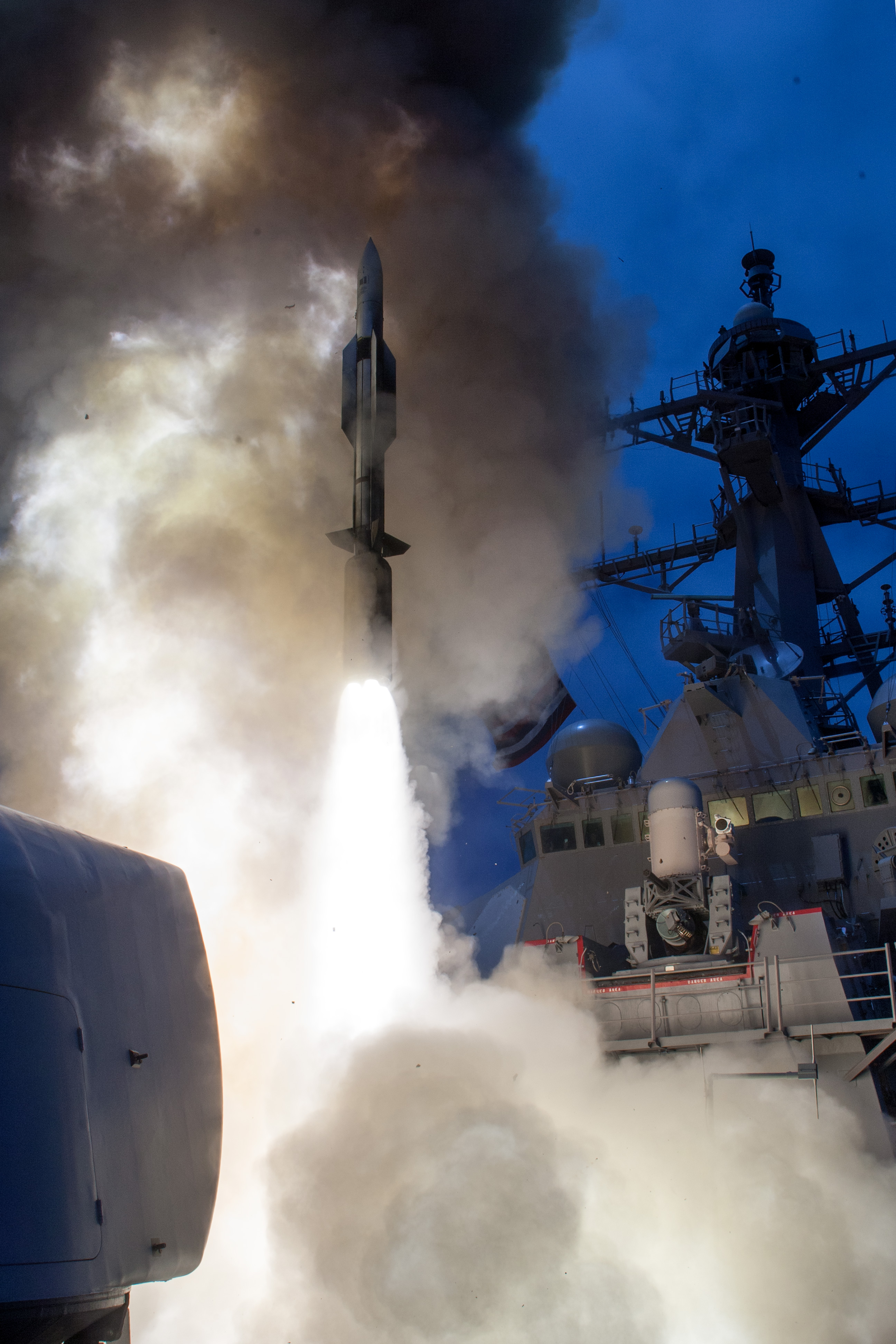
John Paul Jones launches a RIM-174 Standard ERAM (Standard Missile-6, SM-6) during a live-fire test of the ship's Aegis weapons system in the Pacific Ocean in June 2014

John Paul Jones was selected as the Shock Trial platform for the DDG-51 class. The ship was subjected to a series of close range explosions in order for the Navy to obtain critical information concerning the survivability of the DDG-51 class in a shock environment. The crew prepared the ship for the most demanding and complex surface ship shock trial test in the history of the Navy. The ship has completed four deployments to the Persian Gulf.

On 7 October 2001, John Paul Jones launched the first Tomahawk missiles into Afghanistan as part of Operation Enduring Freedom.

In June 2010, she began a ten-month yard period during which her machinery control system and many hull mechanical and electrical systems (HM&E) systems were upgraded. This was a first in class effort, similar to the CG-47 mid life upgrade undertaken on the Ticonderoga hull.

On 10 June 2011, she anchored off the coast of Malibu, California, at the beginning of a three-day celebration called Navy Days designed to thank the sailors and their families for their service to the country. On 29 November 2011, John Paul Jones was the first ship to deploy after receiving the DDGMOD (HM&E) upgrade.

On 1 November 2015, John Paul Jones participated in Campaign Fierce Sentry Flight Test Operational-02 Event 2 (FTO-02 E2), a complex $230 million U.S. military missile defense system test event conducted at Wake Island and the surrounding ocean areas. During the test, the destroyer shot down a simulated anti-ship cruise missile but failed to intercept a medium-range ballistic missile that was launched from a C-17 transport plane.

On 18 January 2016, John Paul Jones sank the decommissioned guided-missile frigate Reuben James in a test of a new anti-surface warfare variant of the Raytheon Standard Missile 6 (SM-6), becoming the first ship to sink a ship with the new variant of the missile. John Paul Jones fired the missile on the U.S. Pacific Missile Range near Hawaii.

On 3 February 2017, John Paul Jones completed a ballistic missile intercept in a test off the west coast of Hawaii. The test marks the first time that a ballistic missile has been targeted using the Standard Missile-3 (SM-3) Block IIA interceptor.

== Awards ==
- Battle "E" -(1994, 1995, 1997, 2000, 2008, 2013, 2016)
- Meritorious Unit Commendation - (1-Jan-1999 to 10-Sep-2001), as a part of Enterprise battle group; 15-Jun-1992 to 27-Jun-1994
- Captain Edward F. Ney Memorial Award for outstanding food service - (2014)

== In popular culture ==
The ship was featured prominently in the 2012 film Battleship. After the sinking of two other destroyers, including sister ship Sampson, she fought alone against the hostile alien fleet. She was later sunk in combat due to severe damage after being specifically targeted by the alien mothership because of the damage she had done to their fleet.

In written fiction, John Paul Jones appeared in 2034: A Novel of the Next World War by Elliot Ackerman and James G. Stavridis, where the ship is ambushed and nearly sunk by the Chinese People's Liberation Army Navy in the South China Sea. The ship also appeared in Tom Clancy's Executive Orders.
