= Waiting for Eden =

2018 novel by Elliot Ackerman

- Author: Elliot Ackerman
- Language: English
- Publisher: Knopf
- Publication date: September 25, 2018
- Publication place: United States
- Pages: 192
- ISBN: 978-1101947395
- OCLC: 1052565948

Waiting for Eden is a 2018 novel by American author Elliot Ackerman. It follows main characters Eden, a veteran of the Iraq War who waits to die in a San Antonio burn center from severe injuries suffered in the conflict, and his wife Mary. She cares for their daughter and struggles with the decision of whether to take husband Eden off life support. The story is narrated by Eden's best friend, killed in the same explosion that badly injured Eden. It revolves around themes of intimacy and grief, and received a generally warm reception.

== Plot ==
While on his second tour in Iraq, US Marine Corporal Eden is caught in the blast from an improvised explosive device while on patrol with his fellow Marine and best friend in their humvee. The blast kills everyone in the vehicle other than Eden, including the book's omniscient narrator. Eden suffers severe burns over the entirety of his body. Eden is transported back to the US for treatment, where he is confined to a hospital bed and suffers constant severe pain. Unable to communicate, he is "not alive, not dead, what it was didn’t have a name."

In the hospital, his wife Mary cares for Eden, and advocates his medical care. She "never leaves him," and "soon Eden became like an appendage to her, one she spoke for ... His body became her own, and she anchored to it. Even as she refused to leave, she wanted him to die." Among these challenges, she watches their daughter take her first steps among the sterile corridors of the military hospital. She struggles with the ultimate decision of whether to take Eden, "immobilized and practically catatonic", off the life support that tethers him to the world.

From the vantage of the novel's narrator, the story explores Eden's inner consciousness. He has a stroke after Mary leaves for the Christmas holiday and his mind becomes "unlocked". The novel explores the history of the couple, including with the narrator; Eden's decision to reenlist in the military, and the experiences of Mary with the "war on terror as it’s waged at home". She is pregnant with the couple's child when Eden prepares to mobilize for his second time.

== Themes ==
In describing the themes of the novel, Ackerman told NPR that although war sets the backdrop for the characters, the narrative is centrally one of intimacy:

...and it's also about grief — which I think is a type of faith, because contained within grief is this assumption that if we make it through it, that there will be healing on the other end. I'm not sure that that healing always occurs, and when it doesn't occur, oftentimes we're left just waiting in this type of liminal state — hence the title of the book.

Ackerman reflected that the choice of the name Mary was intentional, and an allusion to the biblical character, saying "I know lots of Marys, and I think we probably all do." (Note: It is not clear whether this reference, described by Ackerman as someone "who is faithful to somebody that they love" was intended as a reference primarily to Mary, mother of Jesus, to Mary Magdalene, who became a dedicated follower or Jesus, or perhaps to a number of other lesser known religious figures by the same name.) As quoted in Vogue, Ackerman described his work' foundation as grounded in "the cumulative loss of many friends and the larger questions of how we keep faith with each other."

== Reception ==
The Boston Globe described the novel as a "tight-knit, inward-looking reckoning with the costs of military sacrifice — in emphatic flesh-and-blood terms." In their list of anticipated books for the Fall of 2018, critic Ron Charles in The Washington Post praised Ackerman's prowess as "one of the best soldier-writers of his generation".

Joshua Finnell in the Library Journal described Waiting for Eden as "a profound meditation on the liminal space between our past, present, and future," and Alexander Moran of Booklist praised the work as "a deeply moving portrayal of how grief can begin even while our loved ones still cling to life."

In her review of essential books for the 2018 Fall season, Chloe Schama in Vogue described Waiting for Eden as "an unflinching guide to the mental, physical, and familial toll of war."

== See also ==
- Green on Blue, a 2015 novel also by Ackerman
