= Dark at the Crossing =

Book by Elliot Ackerman

Dark at the Crossing: A Novel
- Author: Elliot Ackerman
- Language: English
- Genre: Historical fiction
- Publisher: Knopf
- Publication date: January 24, 2017
- Publication place: United States
- Pages: 256
- ISBN: 978-1101947371

Dark at the Crossing: A Novel was written by Elliot Ackerman. It is his second novel and was a finalist in the National Book Awards 2017 for Fiction.

== Overview ==
Released in 2017, Dark at the Crossing is set mainly in the city of Gaziantep, also known as Antep, in Turkey. The plot follows Haris Abadi, an Arab-American ex-soldier. He served as an interpreter with the U.S. military and now wants to enter Syria to fight with the Syrian Free Army against President Bashar al-Assad's regime. His first attempt to cross from Turkey into Syria is rebuffed, and he is then robbed of his American passport and other possessions. He eventually joins two Syrian refugees: Amir, an exiled revolutionary, and Daphne, Amir's wife, who wants to re-enter Syria and discover if their daughter is still alive. As he spends time with Amir and Daphne, Haris starts to ask himself if he's committed to a free Syria or if he's searching to understand himself.

== Reception ==
The novel was described as "an exploration of loss, of second chances, and of why we choose to believe - a trenchantly observed novel of raw urgency and power." In a review in The New York Times, Lawrence Osborne wrote that Ackerman, "...created people who are not the equivalents of the locally exotic subjects in your average NPR story, and he has used them to populate a fascinating and topical novel." Jennifer Bort Yacovissi, in another review, shared, "This is a tightly packed, nuanced narrative in which virtually every character introduced plays a pivotal role. The story is told with economy and a sense of urgency…" The Kirkus Review said that "Ackerman humanizes a war fraught with tragedy and seemingly without resolution."
