= The Fifth Act: America's End in Afghanistan =

2022 American military memoir

- Author: Elliot Ackerman
- Language: English
- Publisher: Penguin Press
- Publication date: August 9, 2022
- Publication place: United States
- ISBN: 0593492048

The Fifth Act: America's End in Afghanistan is a 2022 memoir written by Elliot Ackerman.

== Overview ==
In this book, Ackerman recounts his life as an infantry officer on combat missions, his decision to leave the military, and the efforts to get Afghans out of the country in 2021 during the U.S. withdrawal. The Fifth Act was published by Penguin Press in August 2022.
