= Red Dress in Black & White =

2020 novel written by Elliot Ackerman

- Author: Elliot Ackerman
- Language: English
- Publisher: Knopf
- Publication date: May 26, 2020
- Publication place: United States
- Pages: 288
- ISBN: 978-0525521815

Red Dress in Black & White is a novel written by Elliot Ackerman. The title references actual news photos taken during 2013 protests in Turkey's Gezi Park of a woman with black hair, wearing a red dress and carrying a white bag, who was attacked by the police. Ackerman was based in Turkey for several years as a journalist, and the book was released the week of the seventh anniversary of the protests. The book was nominated 2021 Andrew Carnegie Medal for Fiction.

== Overview ==
Red Dress in Black & White is set in Istanbul over the course of a single day. It focuses on Murat, a "debt-ridden" Turkish real estate developer, and his wife Catherine, an American who trained as a dancer and is now a museum trustee and art patron. Catherine wants to leave Murat and return to the US with their son William and her lover, an American photographer named Peter. Another character, Kristin, an American diplomat, is linked to Murat, Catherine, and Peter, and influences much of the action.
