= USNS Henry J. Kaiser =

United States Navy resupply ship

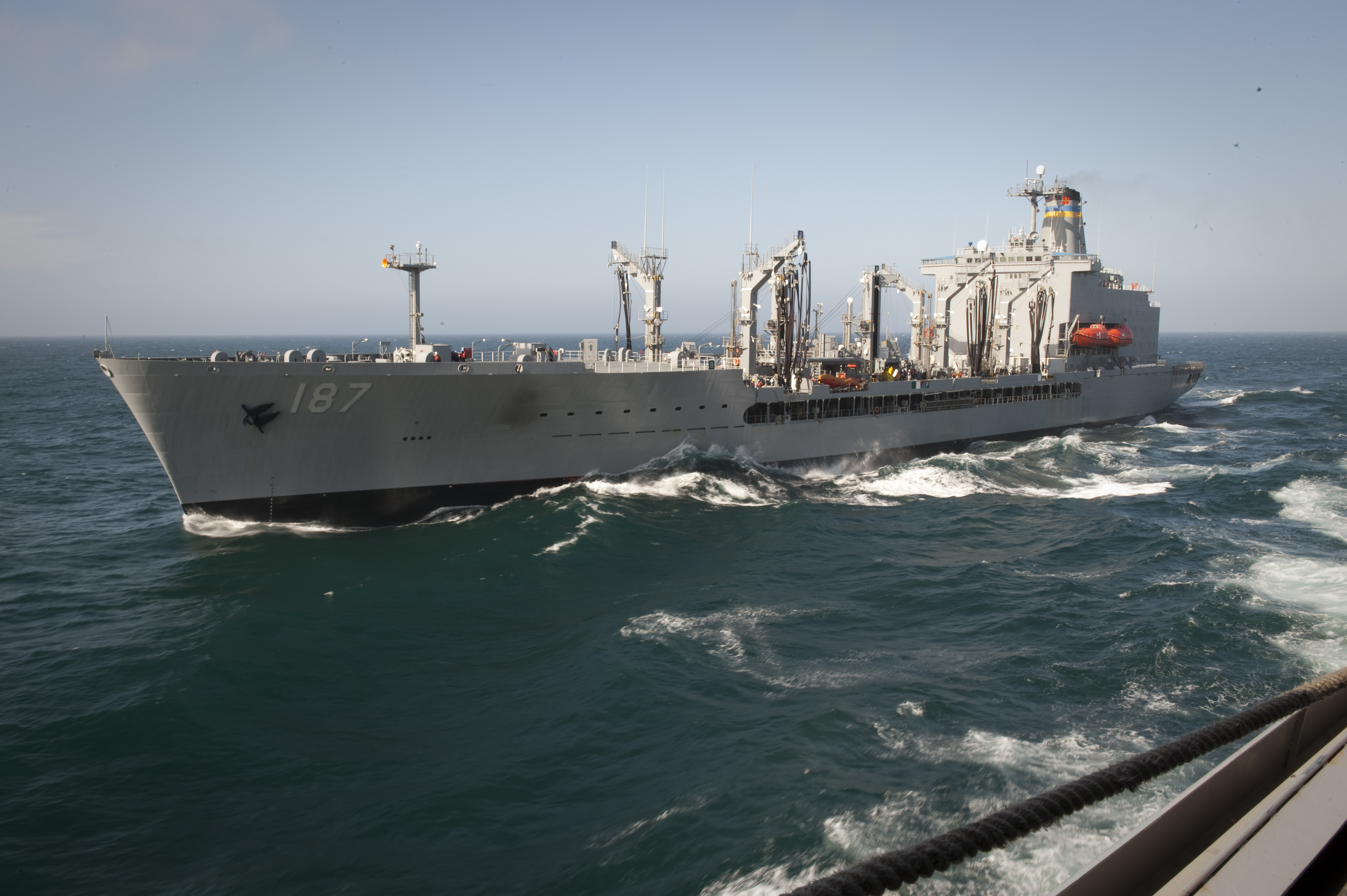
- USNS Henry J. Kaiser on 10 June 2010

History

United States
- Name: Henry J. Kaiser
- Namesake: Henry J. Kaiser
- Awarded: 12 November 1982
- Builder: Avondale Shipyard, Bridge City
- Laid down: 22 August 1984
- Launched: 5 October 1985
- In service: 19 December 1986
- Identification: IMO number: 8302416; MMSI number: 303849000; Callsign: NHJK; Hull number: T-AO-187
- Status: Active

General characteristics
- Class & type: Henry J. Kaiser-class replenishment oiler
- Type: Fleet replenishment oiler
- Tonnage: 27,617 DWT
- Displacement: 14,766 tons light; 40,900 tons at full load
- Length: 677.5 ft (206.5 m)
- Beam: 97.5 ft (29.7 m)
- Draft: 36 ft (11 m) maximum
- Installed power: 2 × Fairbanks Morse PC4-2/2 10V-570 (2 × 16,270 hp (12.13 MW))
- Propulsion: Two shafts with controllable pitch propellers
- Speed: 20 knots (37 km/h; 23 mph)
- Capacity: 180,000 barrels (29,000 m^{3}) of fuel oil and jet fuel; 7,400 sq ft (690 m^{2}) dry cargo space; eight 20-foot (6.1 m) refrigerated containers with room for 128 pallets
- Aviation facilities: Helicopter landing platform

USNS Henry J. Kaiser (T-AO-187) is a United States Navy fleet replenishment oiler and the lead ship of her class. Her mission is to resupply U.S. Navy and allied ships at sea with fuel oil, jet fuel, lubricating oil, potable water, and dry and refrigerated goods, including food and mail.

== Construction and characteristics ==
In November 1983, Avondale Shipyard, Inc. was awarded a firm contract for the construction of two fleet replenishment oilers with options for two more. The first of these, Henry J. Kaiser, was the lead ship of her class. The contract price for the first two ships, was $239.1 million. Henry J. Kaiser was laid down at Avondale's shipyard in Bridge City, Louisiana, on 22 August 1984 and launched on 5 October 1985. She was christened by Janet Small, wife of Admiral William N. Small. Speakers at her launch ceremony included Senator Jennings Randolph, U.S. Representative Lindy Boggs, and Admiral Small. She entered non-commissioned U.S. Navy service with the Military Sealift Command on 19 December 1986. This was approximately three months later than planned because of reduction gear and other issues with her construction.

The ship's hull and superstructure is constructed of welded steel plates. She has just a single hull, not the double-hull construction that is required as an antipollution safeguard in more modern tankers. She is 677.5 feet (206.5 m) long, with a beam of 97.5 feet (29.7 m) and a maximum draft of 36 feet (11 m). She displaces 14,766 tons when empty, and 40,900 tons when fully loaded. Her construction complies with American Bureau of Shipping rules and is periodically inspected by the U.S. Coast Guard.

Her 18 cargo tanks can hold 180,000 barrels of fuel. Her cargo can be either marine diesel fuel for ships or JP-5 jet fuel for aircraft, or some combination of the two. She has separate pumping systems for the different commodities. She has eight 3,000 US gallons (11,000 L) per minute pumps to replenish her clients, five devoted to diesel fuel, and three for JP-5. Thus, during underway replenishment she can pump up to 900,000 gallons of diesel oil and 540,000 gallons of JP-5 per hour. Her dry goods and refrigerated storage is modest, and there is no provision for the ship to carry ammunition. Her total cargo capacity is 27,617 deadweight tons.

The ship can cruise at 20 knots (37 km/h). She has two controllable-pitch propellers, 21 feet (6.4 m) in diameter. Each propeller is driven by a 16,270 brake horsepower Diesel engine. These main propulsion engines are 10-cylinder Colt-Pielstick PC4.2 V 570. Electrical power on the ship is provided by five generators. Two ship service generators are Caterpillar 3608 IL8 Diesels, which generate 2,500 kW each. Two generators use power take-offs from the main propulsion engines and are also capable of 2,500 kW each. Finally, there is a 500 kW emergency generator located away from the main and auxiliary machine rooms.

She has two seawater distillation plants capable of producing 20,000 US gallons (76,000 L) of potable water per day.

The ship is unarmed in peacetime operations. She does, however, have a mount for a Phalanx CIWS gun and carries the SLQ-25 Nixie torpedo decoy.

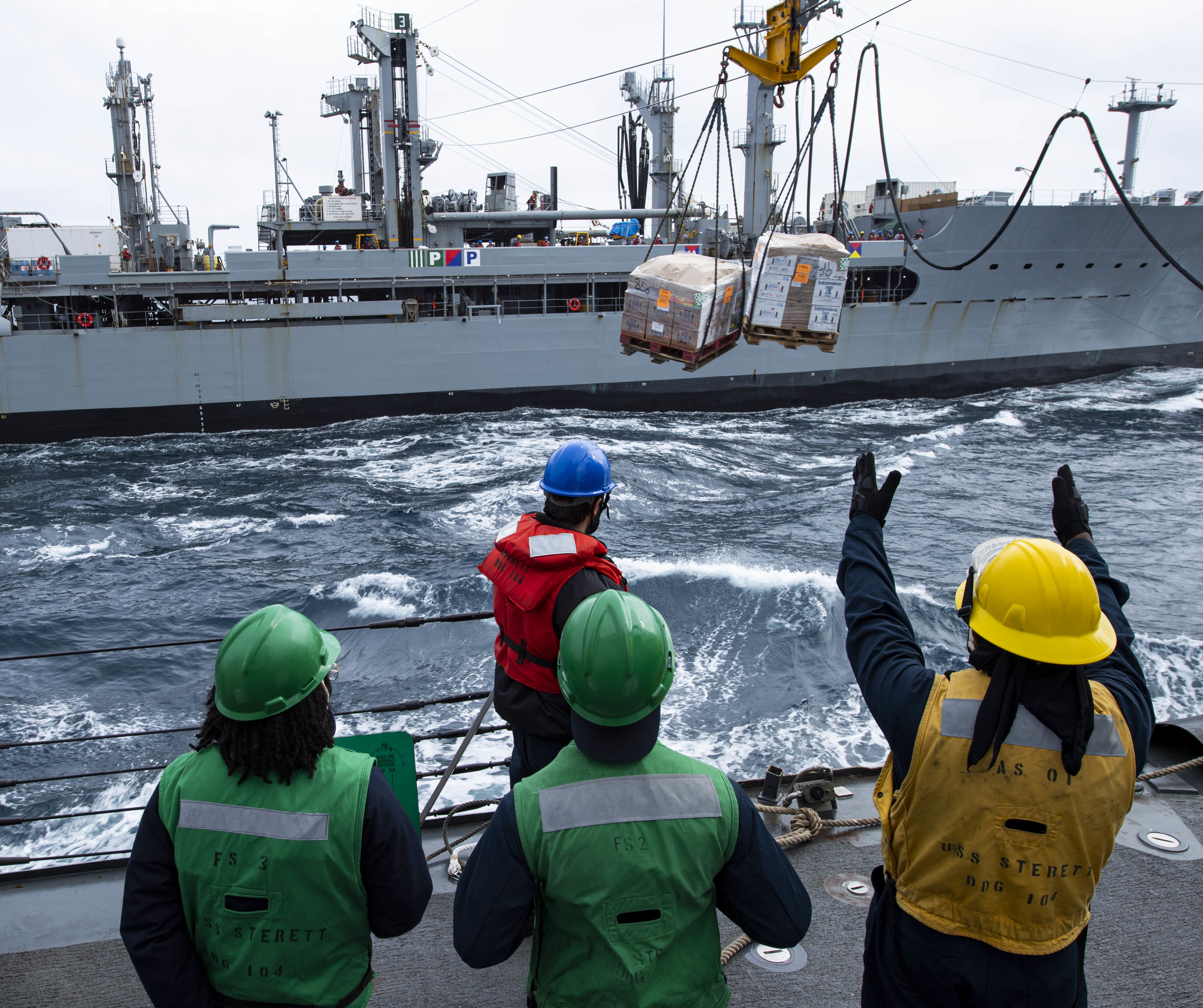
USNS Henry J. Kaiser delivering dry goods to USS Sterett

Henry J. Kaiser has five refueling stations, three on her starboard side and two on her port side, that allow her to pump fuel oil and/or jet fuel to ships on either side, or both sides simultaneously. When fueling, the ship extends hoses to the receiving ship, supported by a connecting span wire. While the ship has five refueling stations, she has sufficient crew to operate only three of them at a time in order to save money. She also has two masts, one on each side of the ship, for the transfer of dry goods. Similar to refueling operations, span wires are kept under constant tension between these masts and receiving ships to form a trolley system, enabling the crew to deliver pallets of dry goods. This underway replenishment technology is referred to as the "standard tension replenishment alongside method". This configuration of replenishment at sea where the two ships are physically connected is referred to as connected replenishment, or "conrep".

She has a helipad on her stern, but no hangar or other facilities to support her own aircraft. Its purpose is to allow helicopters to resupply ships, which the Navy refers to as vertical replenishment, or "vertrep".

The ship is operated by Military Sealift Command. Henry J. Kaiser has a unionized, civilian crew of U.S. Coast Guard-licensed mariners. A military detachment of active-duty Navy personnel, including communications and supply people, also serves on the ship. She has accommodations for 23 officers, 24 noncommissioned officers, and 79 enlisted personnel.

The ship is named for Henry J. Kaiser (1882–1967), an American industrialist and shipbuilder.

== Service history ==
Following delivery, the Henry J. Kaiser operated out of Norfolk, Virginia, as part of the Second Fleet.

During 1988 and 1989 she completed 301 ship refuelings during a 14-month deployment in the Mediterranean in support of Sixth Fleet ships. Shortly after this deployment, during a NATO exercise in September 1989, she damaged a ballast tank off the west coast of England, perhaps by scraping a rock in a channel. Her captain was relieved.

On 1 July 1990 she left Norfolk for what was expected to be a six-month deployment. She was gone for more than nine months supporting Navy ships off the coast of Africa during the evacuation of Liberia, and in the Mediterranean. She completed 146 replenishments on this deployment.

Henry J. Kaiser was in the Red Sea in 1994 when the Egyptian ferry Al-Qamar Al-Saudi Al-Misri caught fire with approximately 580 people aboard. The ship participated in the rescue efforts and brought 270 survivors to port at Hurghada.

In January 1995, she was forward deployed to Diego Garcia in the Indian Ocean as part of Maritime Prepositioning Ships Squadron Two. In this role she was used as a jet fuel tanker.

In March 1997 Henry J. Kaiser participated in Tandem Thrust 97, a joint U.S.–Australian exercise. The Navy reported that refueling at sea, rather than making port calls in Australia, saved $1.5 million.

In 2000 she was prepositioned in the Mediterranean. In 2002, she was transferred to the Third Fleet and placed in reduced operating status in Portland, Oregon. She was activated briefly in 2003 when two other oilers were simultaneously undergoing planned maintenance. In 2005, she was re-activated to full service as part of the Third Fleet, where she remains to this day.

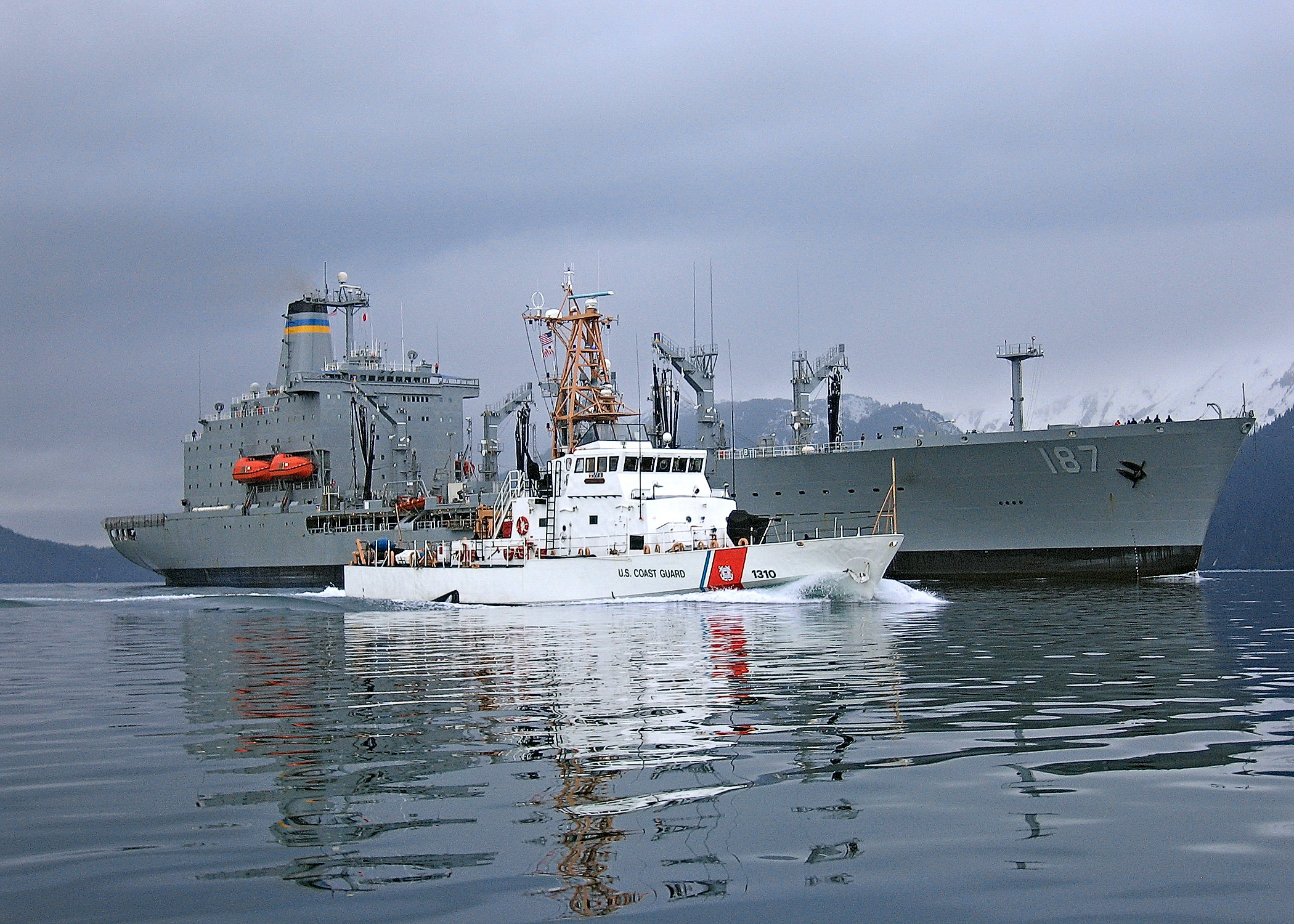
Henry J. Kaiser in Seward, Alaska, with U.S. Coast Guard cutter Mustang during a U.S. Northern Command exercise in 2007

In 2009 the ship participated in underway replenishment training with Third Fleet carrier strike groups and amphibious ready groups.

During Operation Iraqi Freedom in 2011, the ship supported Fifth Fleet units in the Arabian Sea and the Gulf of Oman.

Henry J. Kaiser participated in the biennial RIMPAC exercise in 2012, 2014, 2016, 2018, and 2020. In 2012, Henry J. Kaiser delivered 900,000 gallons of a 50–50 blend of advanced biofuels and traditional petroleum-based fuel to the USS Nimitz strike group. The fuel delivery was part of the Navy's Great Green Fleet demonstration, which allowed the Navy to test, evaluate, and demonstrate the utility of advanced biofuels in an operational setting. This achieved one of the five energy goals established by Secretary of the Navy Ray Mabus. During the 15 days of RIMPAC 2020 the ship conducted 39 underway replenishments, transferring almost 4 million gallons of diesel oil, 65,000 gallons of JP-5 jet fuel, and 183 pallets of food and other dry goods.

The ship provided support to ships participating in Operation Dawn Blitz, in 2013 and 2015.

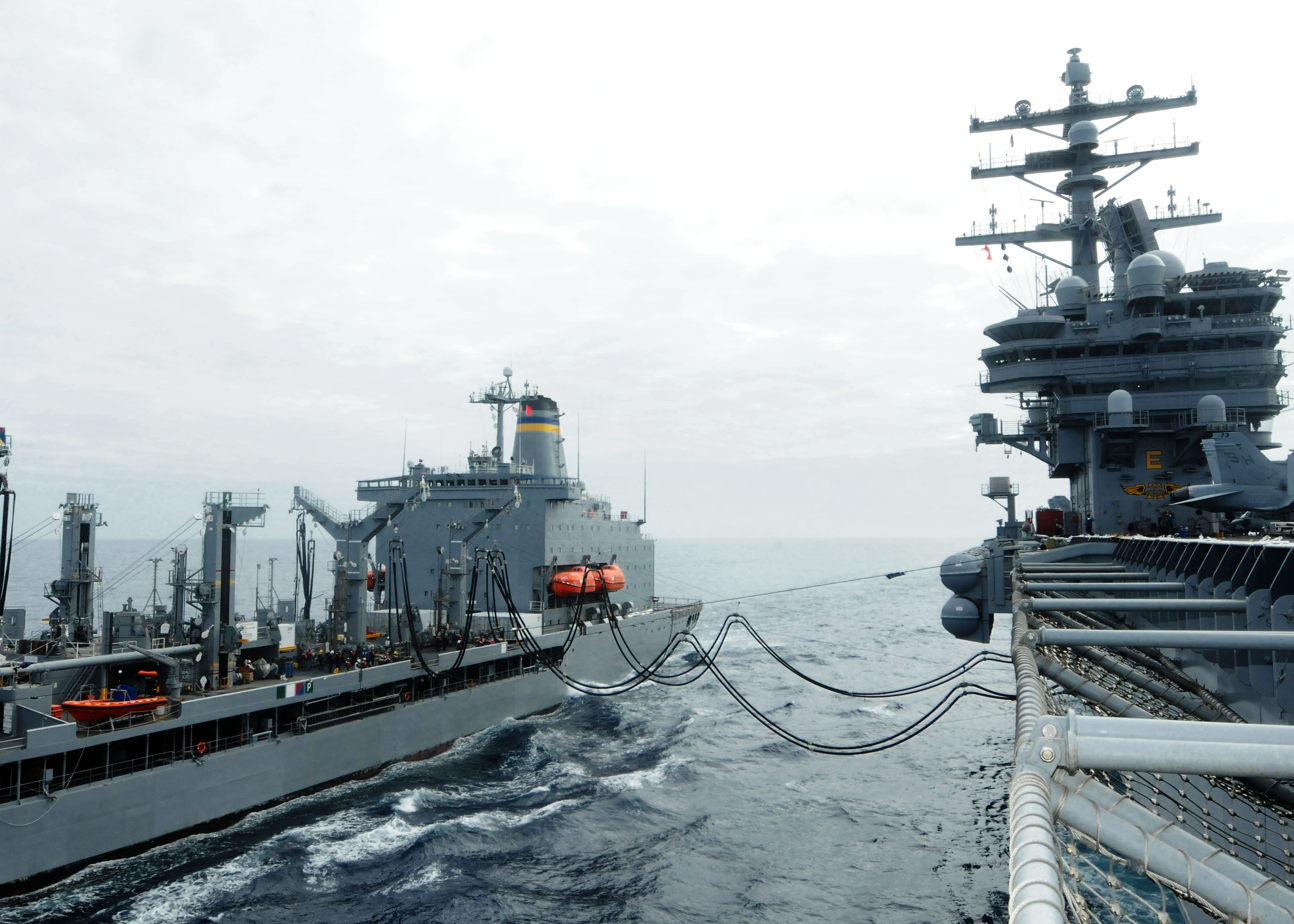
Henry J. Kaiser replenishing aircraft carrier Abraham Lincoln in 2013

Henry J. Kaiser took part in exercise Fortune Guard in August 2014, off the coast of Hawaii, with Japanese, Korean, and U.S. Coast Guard vessels. In this exercise, the ship was the "suspect vessel", supposedly carrying weapons of mass destruction, to train other units on boarding techniques.

In 2016 and 2018 the ship participated in the Pacific Partnership exercise, training with other US and allied navy ships to improve multinational humanitarian assistance and disaster relief preparedness.

In 2019, Henry J. Kaiser supported the USS Theodore Roosevelt strike group in exercise Northern Edge, the first time a U.S. aircraft carrier had been in Alaskan waters for a decade.

The ship has participated in several Composite Unit Training exercises, preparing carrier strike groups and amphibious ready groups for overseas deployments. In July 2013 she supported the USS Boxer group. In 2015 Henry J. Kaiser trained with the USS John C. Stennis strike group. In 2017, she trained with the USS America group and the USS Theodore Roosevelt group. In July 2020 she played this role with the USS Nimitz group.

== Honors and awards ==
- Southwest Asia Service Medal for service during the first Gulf War in 1991
- Coast Guard Special Operations Service Ribbon (two awards, in 1987 and 1989)
