= The Accidental Admiral =

2014 memoir by James G. Stavridis

- Author: James G. Stavridis
- Language: English
- Genre: Memoir
- Publisher: Naval Institute Press
- Publication date: October 2014
- Publication place: United States
- Pages: 288
- ISBN: 978-1-61251-704-9

The Accidental Admiral: A Sailor Takes Command at NATO is a 2014 memoir by James G. Stavridis, a retired four-star admiral in the United States Navy. In this work he recounts his experiences as NATO's 16th Supreme Allied Commander Europe from June 2009 to May 2013 as well as his insights regarding leadership and the future of global security.

== Content ==
In this "memoir of leadership and life lessons," Admiral Stavridis describes the challenges he faced as the most senior leader of NATO, including the complicated operations in Afghanistan, "military intervention in Libya, preparing for possible war in Syria, countering cyber-threats, and confronting piracy."

He advocates for the use of "smart power," the combination of hard and soft power, to achieve international security in the twenty-first century. He explains that building bridges and connections among different global players is important in modern-day international politics.

Stavridis writes chapters on Libya, Israel, Syria, the Balkans, and Russia In each chapter, he contextualizes the problems these nations or regions face. He describes his involvement in these areas as well as personal anecdotes about interacting with foreign leaders during his time as Supreme Allied Commander.

In the final part of his book, Stavridis discusses the values that inform his leadership. With aphorisms like "speak with simplicity and precision," he guides readers on how to be an effective leader in any situation.

== Title ==
The title of Stavridis' book refers to the fact that he was the first admiral to serve as Supreme Allied Commander of NATO, a position which is typically led by generals. He uses this "accidental" event to discuss other unexpected experiences that influenced his life. "Plans don't work," Stavridis says in segment for Pritzker Military Presents, "I think all of our lives are somewhat accidental."

One such accidental experience occurred when Stavridis nearly decided to leave the U.S. Navy after he had fulfilled his active duty requirement, a choice that surely would have shaped his life differently.

== Reception ==
Former U.S. Secretary of Defense Robert M. Gates had positive remarks on the book. He calls Stavridis "one of the most forward-thinking military officers and enlightened leaders of his generation" and states that The Accidental Admiral gives readers a window into what it is like to wrestle with the toughest 21st century problems of strategy and diplomacy.”

The Accidental Admiral was featured as a Reader's Pick on the website for the Christian Science Monitor.

In his review, Ryan Evans praises Stavridis' neutral writing about controversial global events. Evans writes: "Stavridis, perhaps the ultimate warrior-scholar of his generation, offers his views on contentious events candidly, but does not let himself get bogged down in score-settling and vitriol."

In his review for the Naval Historical Foundation, Stephen Phillips writes that Stavridis' works "should be in every naval officer’s collection."

== See also ==
- "The Accidental Admiral | Home - The Accidental Admiral". accidentaladmiral.com.
