= Places and Names: On War, Revolution, and Returning =

Memoir written by Elliot Ackerman

- Author: Elliot Ackerman
- Publisher: Penguin Press
- Publication date: June 11, 2019
- Publication place: United States
- ISBN: 0525559965

Places and Names: On War, Revolution, and Returning is a memoir written by Elliot Ackerman. It was on the New York Times' "10 New Books We Recommend" list in August 2019, and was nominated for the 2020 Andrew Carnegie Medal for Excellence in Non-Fiction.

== Overview ==
In Places and Names, Ackerman shares stories of his deployments as a Marine in Afghanistan and Iraq, as well as his travels in and near Syria as a journalist after leaving the military.
