= Great Green Fleet =

Energy cost saving measure announced 2009

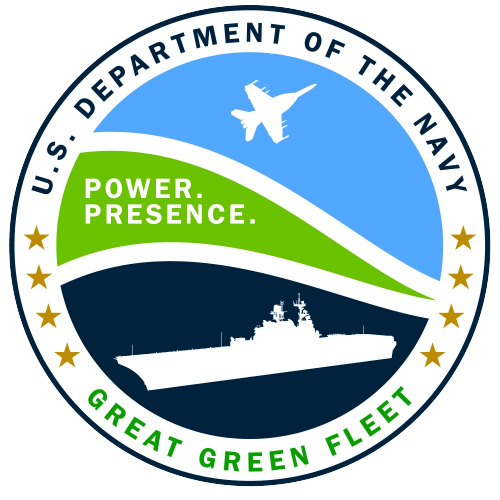

The United States Navy's Great Green Fleet was an energy cost saving measure announced in 2009 to begin using a combination of conventional diesel fuel and biofuels in a 50/50 mixture. The first demonstration by the USS Nimitz carrier task group during RIMPAC (Rim of the Pacific exercise) in 2012 was completed without incident. The Great Green Fleet, the popular nickname, is an homage to the Great White Fleet of the early 20th century.

== Overview ==
Since the 1970s, the world has begun to be acutely aware of the impact of climate change and the influence fossil fuels has had on the progress of the natural migrations of climate. The United States Department of Defense is seeking to change the profile of its energy usage. While each branch of the military has its own goals and plans, the Navy's goals were particularly ambitious:

- Use 50% less petroleum by 2015
- At least 50% of all energy used by the Navy and Marines come from non-fossil fuel sources by 2020.

The Navy's efforts are highlighted by the design of the Great Green Fleet. The carrier, the USS Nimitz, was nuclear powered, but everything else, including the Nimitz's strike aircraft, ran on a 50:50 mix of petroleum and biofuel derived from cooking oil and algae. Fully deployed in 2016, the fleet combines advances in fuels, equipment, and navigation all in an effort to deploy the most energy efficient and modern fleet anywhere in the world.

More than six years after it was first announced, the Great Green Fleet made its maiden voyage on late January 20, 2016. Overall, the 2016 Great Green Fleet initiative was a year-long event. The Department of the Navy obtained 77.66 million gallons of cost-competitive, drop-in biofuels blends in support of the launch of the Great Green Fleet at $2.05 per gal. One of the goals of the Navy in its biofuels program is “not to have to sail to the Middle East every time we re-fuel." The Navy aims to deploy a permanent green strike force after 2016.

"The Great Green Fleet will signal to the world America's continued naval supremacy, unleashed from the tether of foreign oil." - Ray Mabus, Secretary of the Navy

== Strike group composition ==
The 2012 fleet was composed of the aircraft carrier USS Nimitz (CVN 68), the cruiser USS Princeton (CG 59), the two destroyers USS Chafee (DDG 90) and USS Chung Hoon (DDG 93), and the fuel tanker USNS Henry J. Kaiser (T-AO-187).

The 2016 fleet was composed of the aircraft carrier USS John C. Stennis (CVN 74), guided-missile cruiser USS Mobile Bay (CG 53), and guided-missile destroyers USS Chung Hoon (DDG 93), USS Stockdale (DDG 106) and USS William P. Lawrence (DDG 110) are all operating in the Indo-Asia-Pacific using alternative fuel.

== Concerns ==
There are reservations from some politicians, as well as military officials that the transition to alternative fuel sources would be too costly. Beyond the strict fuel costs, there are also concerns about the time and resources which would be required to create the necessary support structure to produce the volume of fuel sufficient for the military's needs. During the oil embargo of 1973 there were extensive and costly efforts to develop alternative fuels. A market for these fuels failed to develop, and economical fuels and research and development was not pursued. Many economists and scientists fear that this atmosphere will not develop for the current fuels.

== Benefits ==
The Navy's goals will further their own objectives, but will also have far-reaching effects in the US and beyond. Reducing US reliance on foreign petroleum has numerous strategic advantages, and could work to avert future conflicts centered around the acquisition of petroleum stores. The call for alternative fuels has already begun to drive innovation, with companies striving to create efficient processes to bring biofuel availability to the necessary scale the military requires. Energy companies Solazyme (CA) and Dynamic Fuels (LA) are working towards numerous fuels and competing for the contracts offered by the U.S. Department of Defense, and continued studies by military and civilian researchers will build momentum in both the scientific community, as well as the energy marketplace. Studies have also shown a decrease in particulate emissions from the use of algal biofuels versus naval diesel fuel. Crossover and cooperation with the civilian marketplace is already underway with comparable studies and efforts underway in civilian aviation and maritime fleets. As all these efforts come together, we may see public acceptance for biofuels grow, and a demand for cleaner, more efficient fuels from populations across the globe.
