= Green on Blue =

Book by Elliot Ackerman

- Author: Elliott Ackerman
- Language: English
- Genre: Historical fiction
- Publisher: Scribner
- Publication date: February 17, 2015
- Publication place: United States
- Pages: 242
- ISBN: 978-1-4767-7857-0

Green on Blue: A Novel is a 2015 work of fiction written by Elliot Ackerman. Set in modern-day Afghanistan, it is told through the point of view of Aziz, a young boy who must join the "Special Lashkar" – a U.S. funded militia – in order to save his injured brother. Dr. Truman Anderson has called Green on Blue a "morally complex debut novel" for how Ackerman explores the themes of loyalty to family and nation, revenge, and the brutality of war throughout the novel.

== Plot ==
The novel opens with Aziz, the protagonist, and his older brother Ali in their home in a remote village in southeastern Afghanistan. Despite their village's isolation among the mountains, the boys have a stable and loving home with their mother and father. The two boys are still quite young when their parents are killed in a raid. Newly orphaned, Aziz and Ali travel to Orgun, a city where they eke out a living at first by begging and later by working in a marketplace.

Political events in Afghanistan shape Aziz's narrative in ways that he does not fully understand until later in the novel. At the same time that Ali is working in the market to pay for Aziz's education, the U.S. forces invade Afghanistan. Local militants and warlords strike back against the Americans, and a bomb explodes in the market in which Ali works, leaving him critically injured.

In the hospital caring for his brother, Aziz encounters an Afghan wearing an American uniform. This man recruits Aziz to the U.S.-funded militia called the "Special Lashkar" because the wages from soldiering will allow Ali to stay in the hospital and receive the medical care he needs.

Aziz departs for the border with the militia and quickly learns about the true nature of war. Through fighting with the Special Lashkar, he develops relationships with people who represent the different directions in which Aziz feels himself pulled. Mr. Jack, an American adviser for the Special Lashkar, is the only American in the novel. Aziz views Mr. Jack with a certain amount of skepticism, and sees the American as an outsider. Aziz also meets the warlord Atal, and is drawn to the man's power as well as Atal's niece, a young woman Aziz comes to fall in love with.

As he rises in the ranks of the militia, Aziz's loyalties are tested by his desire for revenge and his need to protect those he cares for. His dilemma illuminates the complexity of war and the different reasons people take up arms and fight.

== Major themes ==
=== Pashtunwali ===
This Pashtun ethical code is a key to understanding Aziz's ambivalence regarding his involvement in the war. The concepts of badal, meaning revenge, and nang, meaning honor, drive the actions of many of the Afghan characters in the novel. Due to his sense of badal, Aziz feels compelled to take revenge on the warlord responsible for the bombing that injured his brother, as this is the only way that he can restore nang. Aziz struggles to balance the demands of Pashtunwali with a desire to break the cycle of vengeance.

=== The economy of war ===
Aziz's fictional experiences show how often individuals go to war for reasons other than fighting for a national cause. For Aziz and other Afghan characters in Green on Blue, fighting in the Special Lashkar is a source of much-needed income. For others, fighting becomes a way to fulfill their own desire for revenge on an enemy. In an interview with the Huffington Post, Ackerman notes that "the reasons they were fighting were not particularly ideological...the reason why these folks are fighting is they're caught up in cycles of violence, and cycles of need." Green on Blue highlights the complicated and diverse motives surrounding why people go to war and the often self-serving reasons why war continues.

== Reception ==
Many critics have praised Ackerman's choice to write from the perspective of an Afghan narrator, challenging many American assumptions about the war in Afghanistan. In her article for Vogue, Megan O'Grady writes: "[Ackerman's] first novel is a standout both for its setting—remote Shkin firebase, a kind of twenty-first century Guadalcanal—and for the austere grace of its prose. But what sets the novel apart in the annals of American war literature is its daring shift in perspective".

In addition to the narrative choice, Ackerman has been congratulated for inhabiting and portraying a foreign voice with accuracy and impartiality. Khaled Hosseini, who read Ackerman's manuscript early on in the publication stages stated: "[Ackerman's] most impressive feat is the creation of a convincing and credible world through his full immersion in Afghan culture." In his review for The New York Times, Tom Bissell praised this cultural understanding as well, writing: "Elliot Ackerman has done something brave as a writer and even braver as a soldier: He has touched, for real, the culture and soul of his enemy."

Bissell also compared Ackerman's writing to that of Ernest Hemingway for Ackerman's "skilled, unadorned prose about men and women of action" as well as the book's insight into the "notions of honor and manhood."

In The Dallas Morning News, Chris Vognar described Green on Blue and Phil Klay's Redeployment as "carrying the sting of authenticity and the sensory expression of experiences lived."
