= 2034: A Novel of the Next World War =

2021 novel by Eliot Ackerman and James Stavridis

- Author: Elliot Ackerman; James G. Stavridis
- Cover artist: Christopher Brian King
- Language: English
- Genre: Thriller
- Publisher: Penguin Press
- Publication date: March 9, 2021
- Publication place: United States
- Pages: 303
- ISBN: 978-1-9848-8127-4

2034: A Novel of the Next World War is a 2021 novel written by Elliot Ackerman and retired Admiral James G. Stavridis. The novel received positive reception from critics upon release.

== Overview ==
2034 is a geopolitical thriller that imagines World War III as a naval clash between the United States and China in the South China Sea in the year 2034.

== Background ==
The authors wrote 2034: A Novel of the Next World War as a cautionary tale to urge readers to confront the dangerous realities of geopolitical rivalry between the United States and China. The authors drew on their personal experiences in war as inspiration, with Stavridis stating that the book's opening scene (which featured a freedom of navigation patrol in the South China Sea) was accurate to his experience as a commander of destroyers.

== Reception ==
The Washington Post published a positive review, specifically directing praise at the book's prose and refusal to label the war as having been sparked by any specific political party. The New York Times and The Wall Street Journal praised the book's characters, especially their inner conflicts about the war and its origins. The New York Journal of Books was also positive, with the reviewer directing praise at the prose for being technically accurate while still being entertaining. Publishers Weekly praised the book for its depiction of war at a human level, noting that it did not delve into hardware specifics like other military thrillers. Kirkus was similarly positive, describing the book as "required reading for our national leaders."

A sequel, 2054: A Novel, by the same authors, was published in March 2024.
