= Elliot Ackerman =

Former US Marine Raider and author (born 1980)

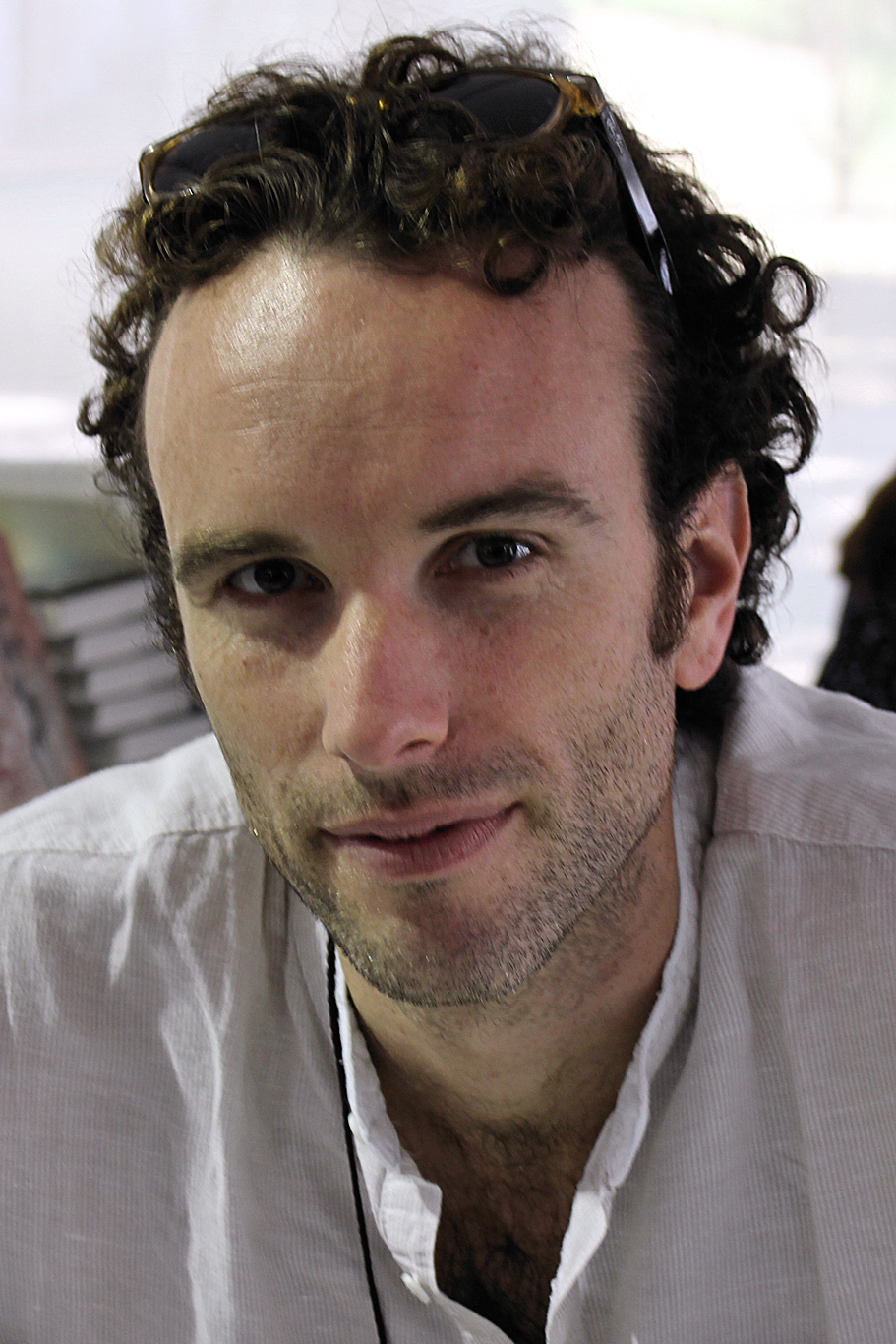
- Ackerman at the 2015 Texas Book Festival
- Born: April 12, 1980 (age 46); Los Angeles, California, U.S.
- Education: Tufts University
- Occupations: Novelist, memoirist, journalist
- Writing career
- Years active: 2013 to present
- Genre: Fiction
- Notable awards: Silver Star, Purple Heart

Elliot Ackerman
- Military career
- Allegiance: United States
- Branch: United States Marine Corps
- Conflicts: War in Iraq; War in Afghanistan

Elliot Ackerman (born April 12, 1980) is an American author, journalist, former Marine Raider and CIA Special Activities Officer. He is the New York Times-bestselling author of the novels 2034: A Novel of the Next World War, Red Dress In Black and White, Waiting for Eden, Dark at the Crossing, Green on Blue, Halcyon, 2054, 2084 and Sheepdogs, as well as the memoirs The Fifth Act: America's End in Afghanistan and Places and Names: On War, Revolution, and Returning. His books have received significant critical acclaim, including nominations for the National Book Award, the Andrew Carnegie Medals in both fiction and non-fiction, and the Dayton Literary Peace Prize. He served as a White House fellow in the Obama administration and is a Marine veteran who served in Iraq and Afghanistan. He is a contributing writer to The Atlantic and has written for The New York Times and, more recently, The Free Press, and is a contributor to CBS News. He is a nonresident senior fellow with the Atlantic Council's Forward Defense program and a senior fellow at Yale's Jackson School of Global Affairs. He was awarded the Silver Star, the Bronze Star with Valor, and a Purple Heart during his five deployments to Afghanistan and Iraq.

== Early life and education ==
He is the son of businessman Peter Ackerman and author Joanne Leedom-Ackerman and the brother of mathematician and wrestler Nate Ackerman. At the age of nine, Ackerman and his family moved to London. The family moved back to the United States, specifically Washington, DC, when he was fifteen.

Ackerman studied literature and history at Tufts University, where he also joined Naval ROTC (Marine Corps option). He graduated summa cum laude and Phi Beta Kappa in 2003. He holds a master's degree in international affairs from the Fletcher School of Law and Diplomacy. He also completed many of the United States military's most challenging special operations training courses.

== Career ==
=== Military ===
Beginning in 2003, Ackerman served eight years in the U.S. Marine Corps as both an infantry and special operations officer. He was initially assigned as a platoon commander in 1st Battalion, 8th Marines, and served multiple tours of duty in the Middle East and Southwest Asia. As a Marine Corps special operations team leader, Ackerman was the primary combat advisor to a 700-man Afghan commando battalion responsible for capture operations against senior Taliban leadership. He also led a 75-man platoon that aided in relief operations in post-Katrina New Orleans. He was later attached to the Ground Branch of the Central Intelligence Agency's Special Activities Division.

==== Second Battle of Fallujah ====
In 2004, Ackerman led a Marine rifle platoon of 45 men during the Second Battle of Fallujah. During one night of the month-long battle, the platoon established a fighting position in a store. When the sun rose the next day, they were surrounded by insurgents. While wounded himself, Ackerman exposed himself to enemy fire to pull wounded Marines to safety and coordinated four separate medical evacuations. To save the platoon, he ordered his men to use explosives to destroy the store's back wall. Twenty-five men were wounded, but everyone escaped alive. Ackerman was awarded the Silver Star for his "heroics in the battle" and a Purple Heart for his wounds.

==== Afghanistan ====
Ackerman received the Bronze Star for Valor for leading his Marine special operations team through an ambush in Herat Province, Afghanistan, in which one Special Forces soldier was killed.

In 2021, as the Afghan government fell to the Taliban, Ackerman took part in a self-organized, informal effort by veterans, journalists and activists to help evacuate Afghans who had worked alongside U.S. forces. He later wrote in The New York Times that, following the U.S. withdrawal, "it has fallen to veterans and other civilians to try to save those who are desperately appealing for our help." His memoir The Fifth Act recounts these efforts.

=== Political ===
Ackerman served as chief operating officer of Americans Elect, a political organization founded by his father Peter Ackerman, known primarily for its efforts to stage a national online primary for the 2012 US presidential election. As one of its officers, Ackerman was interviewed extensively, notably on NPR's Talk of the Nation.

Ackerman has served on the board of the Afghan Scholars Initiative and as an advisor to the No Greater Sacrifice scholarship fund. He is a lifetime member of the Council on Foreign Relations.

In 2012 to 2013, Ackerman served as a White House fellow in the Obama administration.

=== Author and journalist ===
Ackerman has written and published eight novels (Green on Blue, Dark at the Crossing, Waiting for Eden, Red Dress in Black & White, Halcyon, 2054 and 2084 with Admiral James G. Stavridis, and Sheepdogs), and two memoirs (Places and Names: On War, Revolution, and Returning and The Fifth Act: America's End in Afghanistan). His fiction and essays have also appeared in The New Yorker, The Atlantic, The New Republic, The New York Times Magazine, Esquire, Time, Harper's Magazine, Ecotone and others (see Selected Bibliography). He was a writer for Esquire, and is also a contributor to The Daily Beast and, more recently, The Free Press, where his recurring "A Man Should Know" series and commentary on defense policy have appeared.

==== Green on Blue ====
Ackerman's first novel, Green on Blue, was published February 17, 2015 by Scribner. Tom Bissell of the New York Times Book Review said,

Like all novels written in skilled, unadorned prose about men and women of action, this novel will probably be compared to Hemingway's work. In this case, however, the comparison seems unusually apt ... Elliot Ackerman has done something brave as a writer and even braver as a soldier: He has touched, for real, the culture and soul of his enemy.

The Los Angeles Review of Books describes the novel as a "radical departure from veterans writing thus far" due to his choice of a first-person narrator, the lowly Aziz, a poor soldier in a local militia. The Stars and Stripes review described Green on Blue and Phil Klay's Redeployment as carrying "the sting of authenticity and the sensory expression of experiences lived". Green on Blue was a New York Times Book Review Editors' Choice.

==== Dark at the Crossing ====
Ackerman's second novel Dark at the Crossing, published January 24, 2017, by Alfred A. Knopf, was a finalist for the National Book Award in 2017. In a starred review Library Journal wrote, "Here is a thriller, psychological fiction, political intrigue, and even a love story all wrapped into a stunningly realistic and sometimes horrifying package. Put Ackerman on the A-list." In the New York Times Book Review the novelist Lawrence Osborne wrote, "One could argue that the most vital literary terrain in America's overseas wars is now occupied not by journalists but by novelists ... Elliot Ackerman is certainly one of those novelists ... He has created people who are not the equivalents of the locally exotic subjects in your average NPR story, and he has used them to populate a fascinating and topical novel." Dark at the Crossing was noted as one of the best books of the year by the Washington Post, NPR, the Christian Science Monitor, Military Times, Vogue, and Bloomberg and was a New York Times Book Review Editors' Choice. Ackerman was a featured author at the Miami Book Fair in 2017.

==== Waiting for Eden ====
Ackerman's third novel Waiting for Eden was published September 25, 2018, by Alfred A. Knopf. The book was nominated for the Andrew Carnegie Medal for Excellence in Fiction, and it won the Marine Corps Heritage Foundation's James Webb Award. Author Anthony Swofford wrote in The New York Times Book Review, "Masterly ... Brilliant ... In his short novel, Ackerman accomplishes what a mountain of maximalist books have rarely delivered over tens of thousands of pages and a few decades: He makes pure character-based literary art, dedicated only to deeply human storytelling." The novel was one of the best books of the year on Amazon, NPR, and the Washington Post and was a New York Times Book Review Editors' Choice.

==== Places and Names: On War, Revolution, and Returning ====
Ackerman's fourth book Places and Names: On War, Revolution, and Returning was published June 11, 2019, by Penguin Press. The memoir was nominated for the 2020 Andrew Carnegie Medal for Excellence in Non-fiction. Time magazine named it a must-read book of 2019. It was also a New York Times Book Review Editors' Choice.

==== Red Dress in Black & White ====
Ackerman's fifth book Red Dress in Black & White was published May 26, 2020, by Alfred A. Knopf. The novel was nominated for the 2021 Andrew Carnegie Medal for Excellence in Fiction and was also a New York Times Book Review Editors' Choice.

==== 2034: A Novel of the Next World War ====
2034: A Novel of the Next World War is jointly authored by Admiral James G. Stavridis, USN (Ret.), and was released on March 9, 2021, by Penguin Press. The novel, a New York Times bestseller, imagines a war between the United States and China in the South China Sea.

==== The Fifth Act: America's End in Afghanistan ====
In The Fifth Act: America's End in Afghanistan, Ackerman recounts his life as an infantry officer on combat missions, his decision to leave the military, and the efforts to get Afghans out of the country in 2021 when the U.S. pulled out. The Fifth Act was published by Penguin Press in August 2022.

==== Halcyon ====
Ackerman's sixth novel, Halcyon, an alternate history in which Al Gore won the 2000 presidential election, was published by Knopf on May 23, 2023. Reviewing it for The Washington Post, Mark Athitakis called it "an entertaining thought experiment," and it was a New York Times Book Review Editors' Choice.

==== 2054 and 2084 ====
Ackerman and Admiral Stavridis followed 2034 with two further novels of speculative future conflict: 2054, published by Penguin Press in 2024, envisions political upheaval driven by artificial intelligence, and 2084, published in 2026, depicts a war between wealthy and equatorial nations over climate change.

==== Sheepdogs ====
Ackerman's novel Sheepdogs, a comic thriller following two private security operatives, was published by Penguin Press on August 5, 2025, and was a New York Times Book Review Editors' Choice.

==== Articles, Essays, and Short Stories ====
For a period of time, Ackerman lived in Istanbul and worked as a reporter covering the Syrian Civil War. His article "Why Bringing Back the Draft Could Stop America's Forever Wars" was featured on the cover of the October 21, 2019, issue of Time magazine. More recently he has written commentary on defense policy for The Free Press, including on the Pete Hegseth-era Pentagon's "warrior culture" initiatives.

== Awards and honors ==
=== Military awards ===
- 2004 Silver Star (Iraq)
- 2004 Purple Heart (Iraq)
- 2008 Bronze Star for Valor (Afghanistan)

=== Writing awards ===
- 2015 Dayton Literary Peace Prize, finalist (Green on Blue)
- 2015 Amazon Best Book of the Year (Green on Blue)
- 2015 New York Times Book Review Editors' Choice (Green on Blue)
- 2017 National Book Award, finalist (Dark at the Crossing)
- 2017 New York Times Book Review Editors' Choice (Dark at the Crossing)
- 2018 Andrew Carnegie Medal for Excellence in Fiction, longlist (Waiting for Eden)
- 2019 Marine Corps Heritage Foundation James Webb Award (Waiting for Eden)
- 2019 Andrew Carnegie Medal for Excellence in Non-Fiction, longlist (Places and Names: On War, Revolution, and Returning)
- 2019 New York Times Book Review Editors' Choice (Places and Names: On War, Revolution, and Returning)
- 2019 Time magazine Best Books of the Year (Places and Names: On War, Revolution, and Returning)
- 2020 Andrew Carnegie Medal for Excellence in Non-Fiction, longlist (Red Dress in Black & White)
- 2020 New York Times Book Review Editors' Choice (Red Dress in Black & White)
- 2021 New York Times bestseller (2034: A Novel of the Next World War, with Admiral James G. Stavridis)
- 2023 New York Times Book Review Editors' Choice (Halcyon)
- 2025 New York Times Book Review Editors' Choice (Sheepdogs)

== Select bibliography ==
=== Novels ===
- Green on Blue: A Novel. Scribner, 2015. ISBN 978-1476778563
- Dark at the Crossing. Knopf, 2017. ISBN 978-1101947371
- Waiting for Eden. Knopf, 2018. ISBN 978-1101947395
- Red Dress in Black & White. Knopf, 2020. ISBN 978-0525521815
- Halcyon. Knopf, 2023. ISBN 0593321626
- Sheepdogs. Penguin Press, 2025. ISBN 978-0593803851

=== Memoirs ===
- Places and Names: On War, Revolution, and Returning. Penguin Press, 2019. ISBN 0525559965
- The Fifth Act: America's End in Afghanistan. Penguin Press, 2022. ISBN 0593492048

=== Co-authored novels with Admiral James G. Stavridis ===
- 2034: A Novel of the Next World War. Penguin Press, 2021. ISBN 1984881256
- 2054. Penguin Press, 2024. ISBN 978-0593489888
- 2084. Penguin Press, 2026. ISBN 978-0593489895

=== Magazines ===
- "Why Bringing Back the Draft Could Stop America's Forever Wars". Time October 21, 2019
- "Goodbye, My Brother". Esquire March 23, 2017
- "A West Point Literature Professor's Inspiring Plea for Creativity in Our Military". The New Republic October 27, 2014
- "Hometown Heroes". War, Literature and the Arts October 3, 2014
- "Pictures from My War". The New Yorker September 21, 2014
- "Watching ISIS Come to Power Again". The Daily Beast September 7, 2014
- "Charlie Balls". Ecotone, Volume 9, Number 1, Fall 2013, pp. 81–90
- "The Case for Female SEALs". The Atlantic December 24, 2013
- "How Being an Intelligence Officer Made Me a Better Writer". The Free Press August 4, 2025

== See also ==
- James G. Stavridis
