= James G. Stavridis =

US Navy admiral (born 1955)

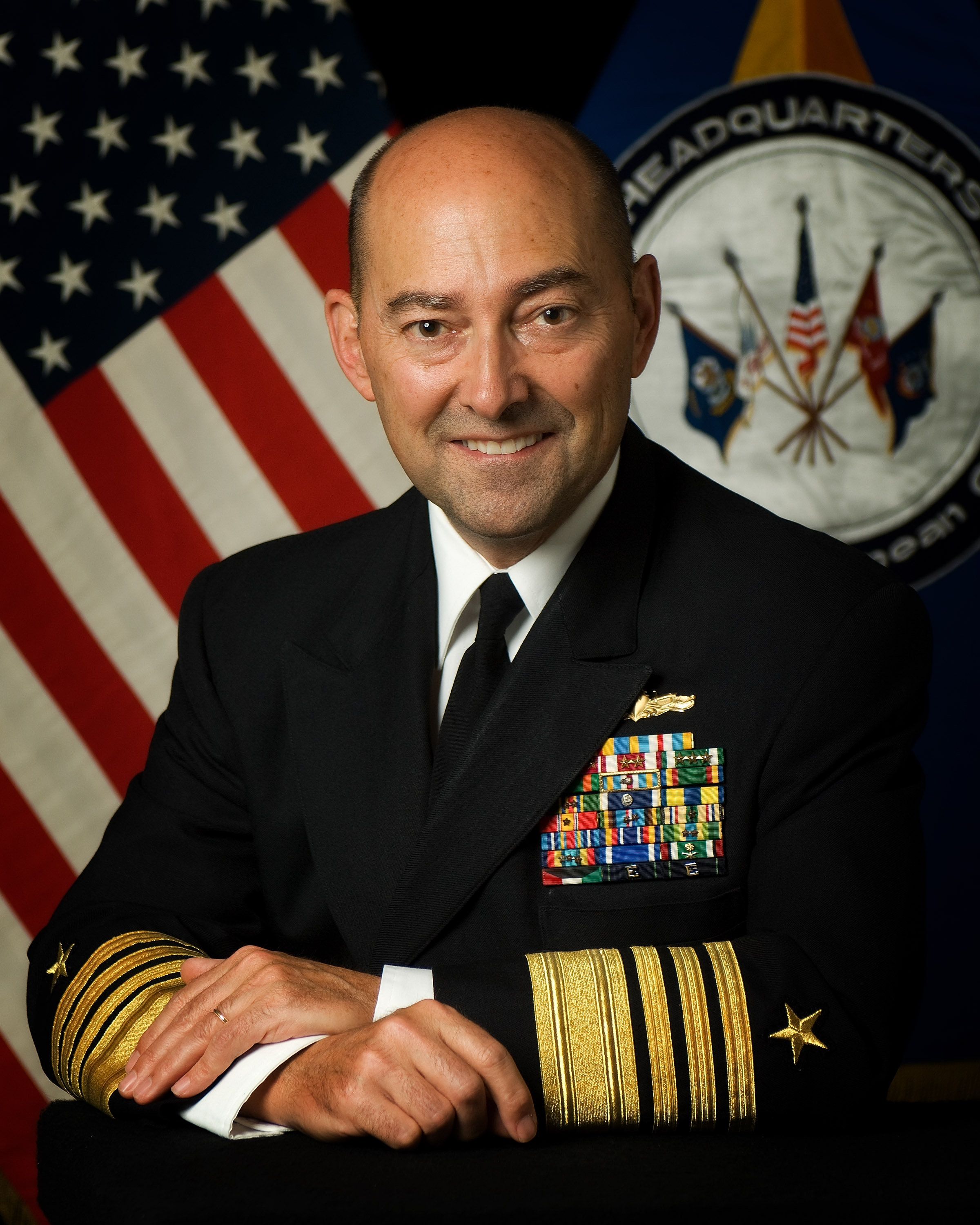
- Stavridis in July 2009
- Born: February 15, 1955 (age 71); West Palm Beach, Florida, U.S.
- Alma mater: United States Naval Academy (BS); Tufts University (PhD)
- Military career
- Allegiance: United States
- Branch: United States Navy
- Service years: 1976–2013
- Rank: Admiral
- Nickname: Zorba
- Commands: Supreme Allied Commander Europe; United States European Command; United States Southern Command; Enterprise Carrier Strike Group; USS Barry
- Conflicts: Gulf War; War in Afghanistan; Iraq War; First Libyan Civil War
- Awards: Defense Distinguished Service Medal (2); Navy Distinguished Service Medal; Defense Superior Service Medal; Legion of Merit (5)

James George Stavridis (born February 15, 1955) is a retired United States Navy admiral and Vice Chairman of Carlyle, a global investment firm, and chair of the board of trustees of the Rockefeller Foundation. Stavridis serves as senior military analyst for CNN. He is also chair emeritus of the board of directors of the United States Naval Institute.

Stavridis graduated from the United States Naval Academy in 1976. While in the Navy, Stavridis served as the commander, United States Southern Command (2006 to 2009) and commander, United States European Command and NATO Supreme Allied Commander Europe (2009 to 2013), the first Navy officer to have held these positions. Stavridis earned a PhD and Master of Arts in Law and Diplomacy from The Fletcher School of Law and Diplomacy at Tufts University in 1984, where he won the Gullion Prize.

Harvard University published a case study on Admiral Stavridis' leadership called "Hearts and Minds: Admiral Jim Stavridis on the Art of Wrangling NATO".

Stavridis retired from the Navy in 2013 after thirty-seven years of service and became the dean of the Fletcher School of Law and Diplomacy at Tufts University, a graduate school for international affairs. He stepped down in August 2018.

Stavridis was considered as a potential vice-presidential running mate by the Hillary Clinton campaign in 2016 and as a possible Secretary of State by President-elect Donald Trump in the fall of 2016.

Stavridis is also a bestselling author. His book The Accidental Admiral, describing his time in the Navy, was published in October 2014. The Leader's Bookshelf, published in 2017, describes the top 50 books that, according to Stavridis, inspire better leadership. A second book published in 2017 called Sea Power: The History and Geopolitics of the World's Oceans opened at No. 9 on The Washington Post's non-fiction bestseller list. His book Sailing True North: Ten Admirals and the Voyage of Character was published by Penguin Random House on October 15, 2019. His novel 2034: A Novel of the Next World War, co-written with Elliot Ackerman and published in March 2021, debuted at No. 6 on The New York Times Best Seller list. His book "The Sailor's Bookshelf: Fifty Books to Know the Sea" was published in November 2021 and "To Risk It All: Nine Conflicts and the Crucible of Decision" was published in May 2022. The sequel to 2034, 2054: A Novel, co-written with Elliot Ackerman, was published in March 2024. His novel The Restless Wave: A Novel of the United States Navy was published by Penguin Random House in October 2025. His book The Admiral's Bookshelf was published in March 2025. A sequel to The Restless Wave, The Turning Tide was published on November 10, 2026.His books have been published in twenty different languages.

== Early life and family ==
Stavridis was born in West Palm Beach, Florida, son of Shirley Anne (Schaffer) and Paul George Stavridis. His father was a United States Marine Corps colonel who served in World War II, the Korean War, and the Vietnam War. Stavridis graduated from McClintock High School in Tempe, Arizona in 1972. Stavridis is married to Laura Hall, author of Navy Spouses Guide. His paternal grandparents were Anatolian Greeks, born and raised in Western Anatolia, who emigrated to the United States. His mother's family was Pennsylvania Dutch.

In his 2008 book, Destroyer Captain: Lessons of a First Command, Stavridis wrote:

In the early 1920s, my grandfather, a short, stocky Greek schoolteacher named Dimitrios Stavridis, was expelled from Turkey as part of 'ethnic cleansing' (read pogrom) directed against Greeks living in the remains of the Ottoman Empire. He barely escaped with his life in a small boat crossing the Aegean Sea to Athens and thence to Ellis Island. His brother was not so lucky and was killed by the Turks as part of the violence directed at the Greek minority.

A NATO exercise off the coast of modern Turkey was the "most amazing historical irony [he] could imagine," and prompted Stavridis to write of his grandfather: "His grandson, who speaks barely a few words of Greek, returns in command of a billion-dollar destroyer to the very city—Smyrna, now called İzmir—from which he sailed in a refugee craft all those years ago."

== Naval career ==
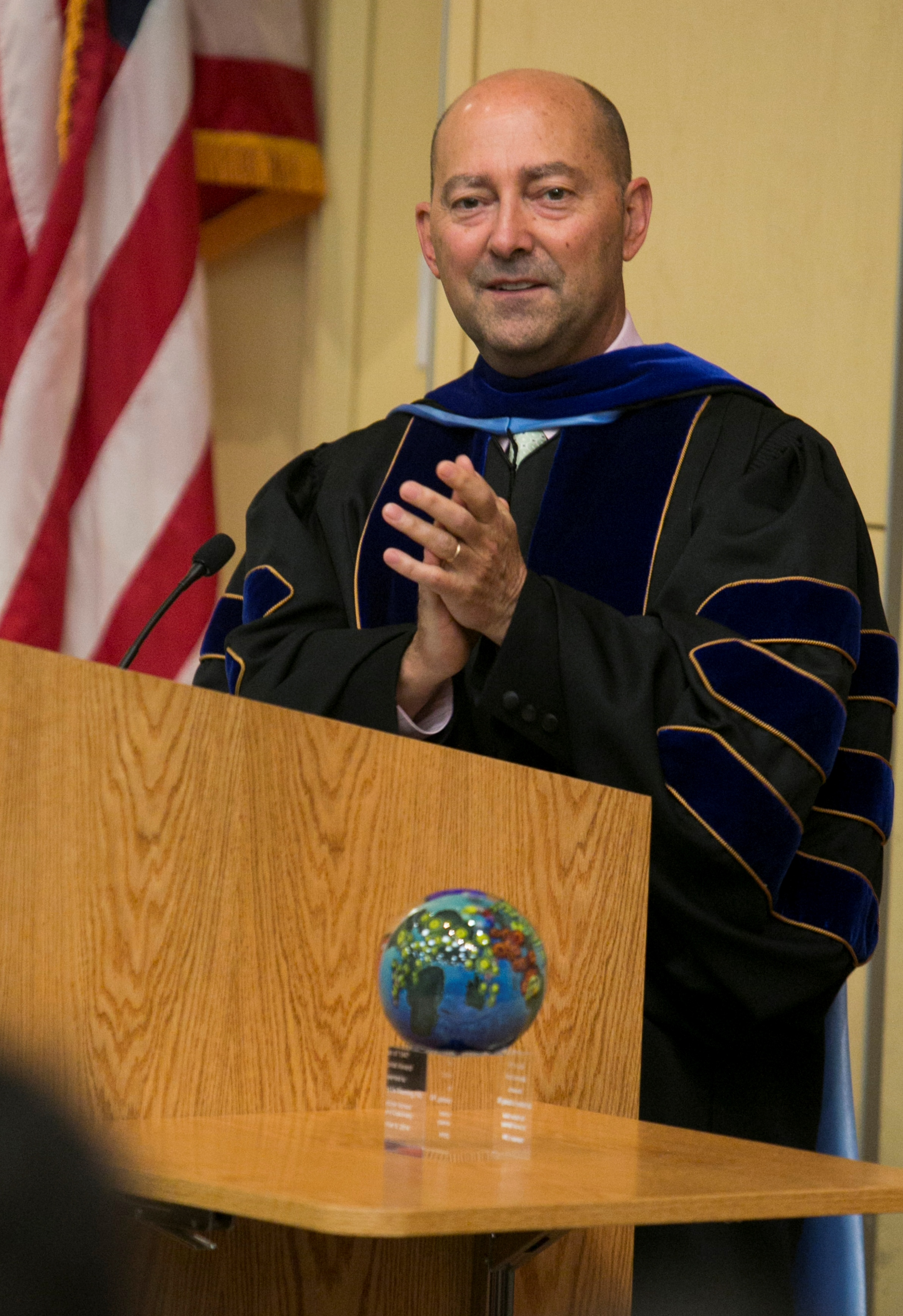
ADM James G. Stavridis, former Commander, EUCOM, and NATO Supreme Allied Commander Europe, in 2014

Stavridis is a 1976 distinguished graduate of the United States Naval Academy. He is a career surface warfare officer and served at sea in aircraft carriers, cruisers, and destroyers. After serving with distinction as Operations Officer on the newly commissioned USS Valley Forge, Stavridis served as Executive Officer on USS Antietam CG-54. Stavridis commanded destroyer USS Barry from 1993 to 1995, completing deployments to Haiti, Bosnia, and the Persian Gulf. Barry won the Battenberg Cup as the top ship in the Atlantic Fleet under his command. In 1996–1997, he attended MIT Seminar XXI. In 1998, he commanded Destroyer Squadron 21 and deployed to the Persian Gulf in 1998, winning the Navy League's John Paul Jones Award for Inspirational Leadership.

From 2002 to 2004, Stavridis commanded Enterprise Carrier Strike Group, conducting combat operations in the Persian Gulf in support of both Operation Iraqi Freedom and Operation Enduring Freedom. Afterwards, as a vice admiral, Stavridis served as senior military assistant to the United States Secretary of Defense. On October 19, 2006, he became the first Navy officer to command the United States Southern Command in Miami, Florida. In July 2009, he became the 16th Supreme Allied Commander Europe (SACEUR). He retired as SACEUR in 2013.

Ashore, Stavridis served as a strategic and long range planner on the staffs of the Chief of Naval Operations and the Chairman of the Joint Chiefs of Staff. At the start of the "Global War on Terror", he was selected as the director of the Navy Operations Group, Deep Blue, USA. He has also served as the executive assistant to the Secretary of the Navy and the senior military assistant to the United States Secretary of Defense. He was promoted directly from 1-star rank to 3-star rank in 2004.

Stavridis has long advocated the use of "smart power," which he defines as the balance of hard and soft power taken together. In numerous articles and speeches, he has advocated creating security in the 21st century by building bridges, not walls. Stavridis has stressed the need to connect international, inter-agency, and public-private actors to build security, lining all of them with effective strategic communications. His message was articulated in his book "Partnership for the Americas", which was published by the NDU Press and was based on his time as Commander of the U.S. Southern Command from 2006–2009. The book was summarized in his 2012 Ted Global talk in Scotland, which has been viewed more than 700,000 times online.

Based on an anonymous complaint, in early 2011 the Department of Defense Inspector General began investigating allegations that Stavridis "engaged in misconduct relating to official and unofficial travel and other matters." He was subsequently the subject of a May 3, 2012, report by the Inspector General, and was later absolved of wrongdoing by the Secretary of the Navy on September 11, 2012. In a Memorandum for the Record, Secretary of the Navy Ray Mabus wrote that Stavridis "has consistently demonstrated himself to be a model naval officer and a devoted public servant whose motivation is to do that which is necessary and appropriate to advance the interests of the United States." Mabus concluded that "I have determined that ADM Stavridis never attempted to use his public office for private gain nor did he commit personal misconduct."

Stavridis earned a Master of Arts in Law and Diplomacy in 1983, and a PhD in International Relations in 1984, from The Fletcher School of Law and Diplomacy at Tufts University, where he won the Gullion Prize as outstanding student. Stavridis is also 1992 distinguished graduate of the United States National War College.

== Dean of the Fletcher School ==
Stavridis was appointed dean of the Fletcher School of Law and Diplomacy at Tufts University on July 1, 2013.

As dean, Stavridis initiated a strategic planning process, invited several high level speakers to the campus, and is focusing thematically on the Arctic, the role of women in international relations, synthetic biology and its impact on foreign affairs, cyber, and the role of online media and social networks in public diplomacy.

== Media and public speaking ==
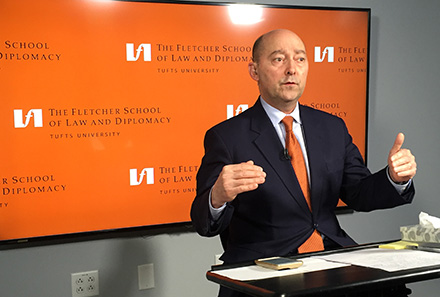
Admiral Stavridis in the remote studio at The Fletcher School in 2016

Since leaving active duty, Stavridis has frequently appeared on major broadcast and cable television networks to comment on national security and foreign policy matters. He has frequently appeared on news networks like CNN, Fox News, BBC and Bloomberg, and was chief international diplomacy and national security analyst for NBC News and MSNBC. He is a Bloomberg Opinion columnist and senior military analyst for CNN and has written hundreds of articles in many diverse publications including Time, Nikkei Asian Review, Foreign Policy, Huffington World Post, and Proceedings, the magazine of the U.S. Naval Institute. Many of his media appearances and writings are linked from the news page of his personal website.

Tufts University had a remote television studio installed on the campus of The Fletcher School so that Stavridis and other faculty and administrators could easily make themselves available to the international media. In August 2016 NBC News named Stavridis as their "chief international security and diplomacy analyst." Also in August 2016, according to Stavridis' official Twitter account, he began a monthly column for Time.com. The first column was about a "grand bargain" with Russia.

Stavridis has also been a public speaker – among his many appearances are multiple appearances at the World Economic Forum in Davos, Switzerland, the Munich Security Conference in 2013, and lectures at Harvard, Yale, Georgetown, The University of Texas at Arlington, and many other universities. He has delivered the "Forrestal Lecture," a major address to the brigade of midshipmen at the U.S. Naval Academy on four occasions.

In July 2022 he was writer-in-residence at Hemingway House in Ketchum, Idaho and was a featured speaker at the Sun Valley Writer's Conference in 2022 and 2021. Stavridis gave the 2024 convocation speech at Virginia Military Institute.

=== Other media activity ===
In November 2022, Stavridis was sanctioned by the Kremlin alongside 200 other Americans for supporting Ukraine during the Russo-Ukrainian War.

In January 2025, during renewed calls for the United States to acquire Greenland by president-elect Donald Trump, Stavridis made headlines for supporting Trump's proposal. Commenting on the hypothetical acquisition, Stavridis added "It's not a crazy idea," continuing that Greenland is "a strategic goldmine for the United States."

== Board and organization membership ==
Stavridis is on the board of several corporations and charitable organizations. In May 2021 he was named chair of the Board of Trustees of the Rockefeller Foundation on which he had served since 2017. He also serves on the Ankura, Aon, and Fortinet boards. Stavridis is also a member of the Council on Foreign Relations and the American Academy of Arts and Sciences.

== Commencement speeches and honorary degrees ==
Stavridis has given numerous commencement and graduation addresses around the country at universities, including the U.S. Naval, War College in 2007, U.S. Merchant Marine Academy in 2008, the University of Miami in 2011, Dickinson College in 2017, and California State Maritime Norwich University in 2018, Metropolitan State University of Denver in 2019, and Sewanee, The University of the South, in 2021, The Citadel in 2022, Adelphi University in 2025, American University in 2025, and Texas Southern University in 2026. He received an honorary Doctor of Public Service degree from Tufts University in 2022 and an honorary Doctor of Humane Letters from American University in 2025. He gave the 2026 commencement speech at Texas Southern University, a noted HBCU, and received an honorary doctorate.

== Consideration for political office ==
On July 12, 2016, The New York Times and other media organizations reported that Stavridis was being vetted by the Hillary Clinton presidential campaign as a possible vice presidential running mate on the Democratic ticket. The Washington Post summarized Stavridis' qualifications in a short video. Publications like the Navy Times cited his NATO leadership as pluses. An article in Politico called him "Hillary's Anti-Trump." Stavridis was quoted in that article as joking, "My name is too long for a bumper sticker." Eventually, Clinton selected Tim Kaine.

On December 8, 2016, Stavridis went to Trump Tower in New York City to meet with president-elect Donald Trump. Following the meeting, Stavridis told reporters that they had discussed world events, cybersecurity and other matters. Press accounts suggested he was under consideration for secretary of state or director of national intelligence. On December 14, 2016, however, in an interview on MSNBC's Morning Joe, Stavridis said that he would not be taking a position in the Trump administration.

== Awards and decorations ==
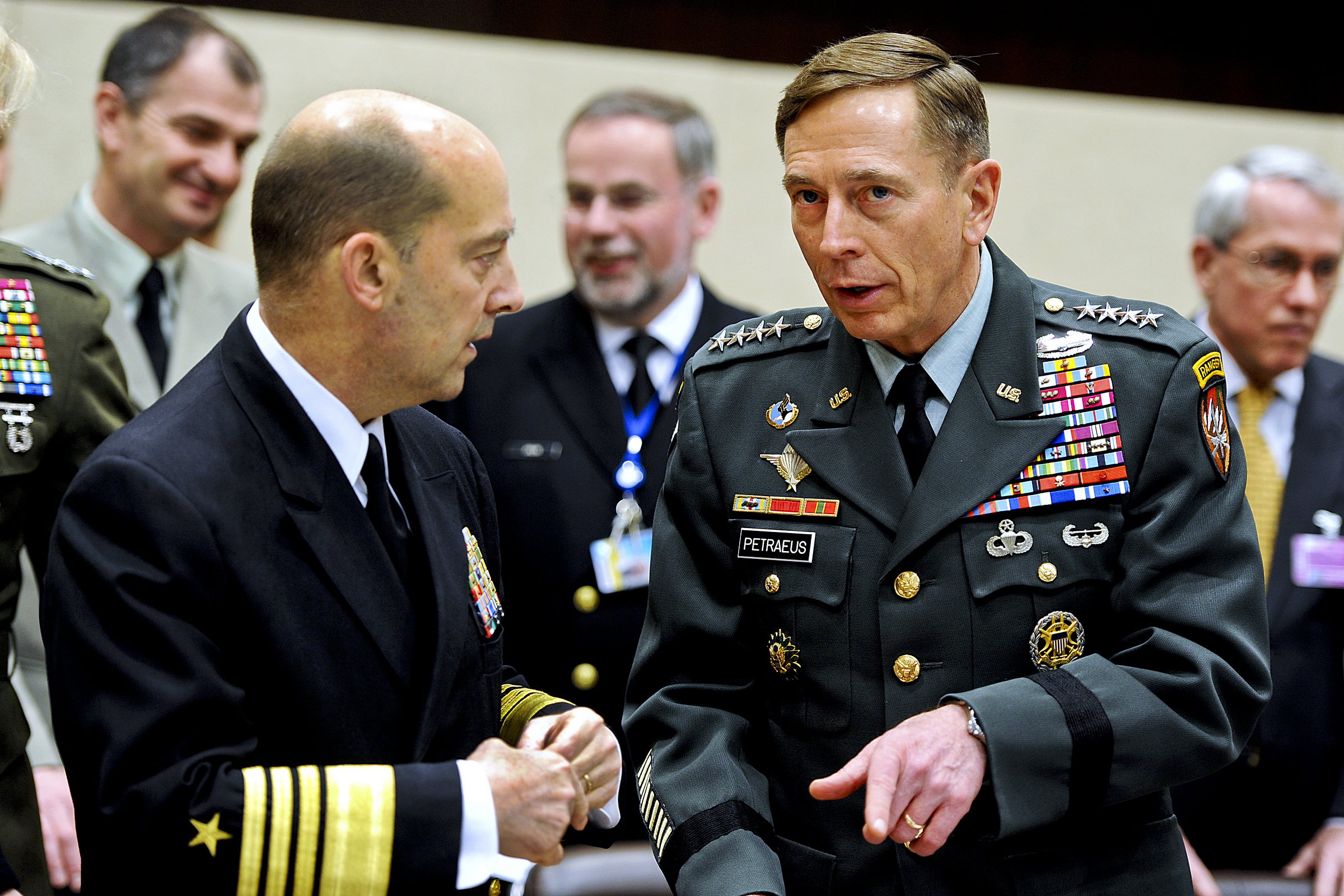
U.S. Army General David H. Petraeus, right, with the U.S. Navy Admiral James G. Stavridis, commander of European Command and NATO's supreme allied commander for Europe in Brussels in 2011

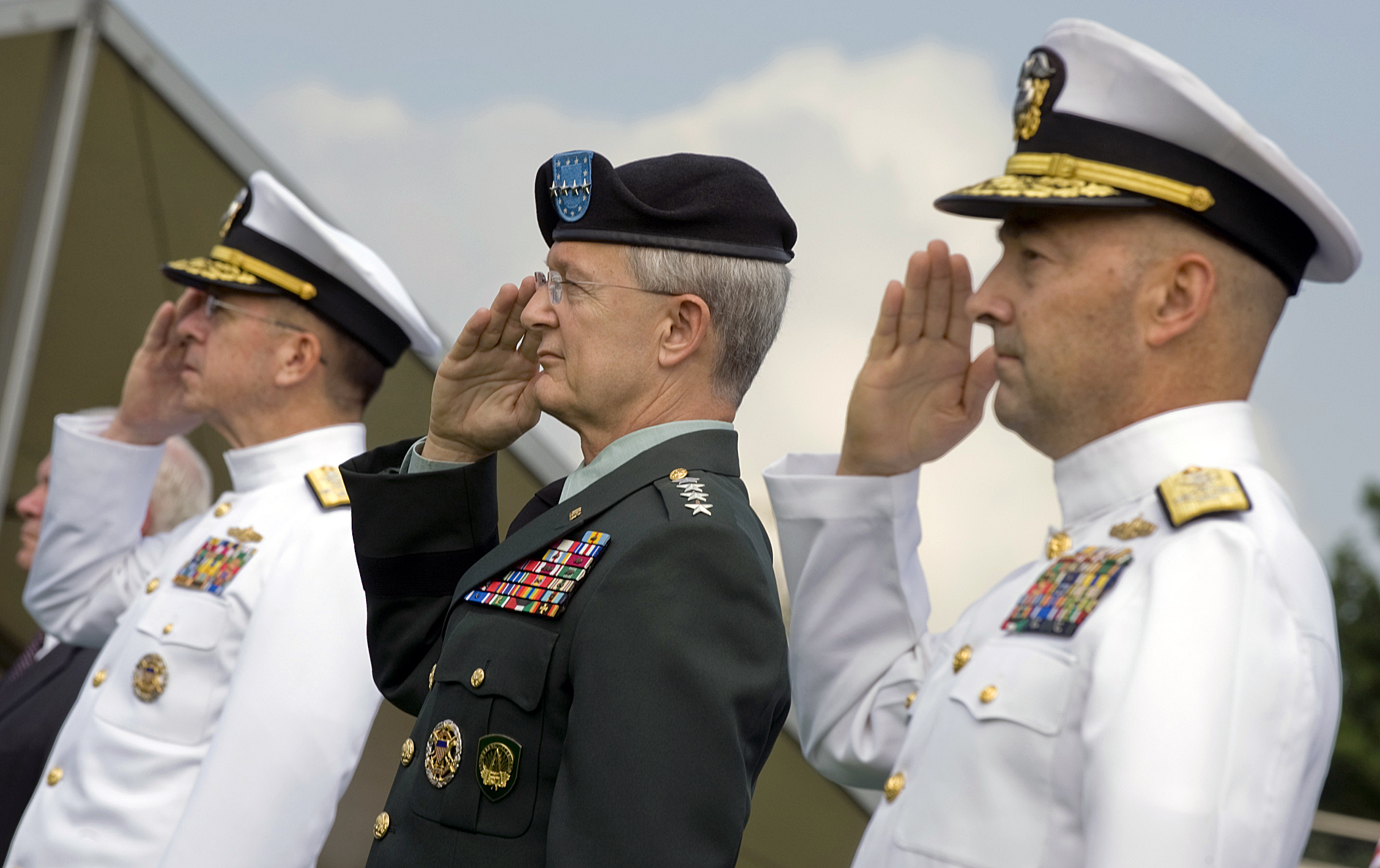
U.S. Navy Admiral Mike Mullen, chairman of the Joint Chiefs of Staff, U.S. Army General John Craddock and U.S. Navy Admiral James G. Stavridis, incoming commander, salute during the national anthem at the U.S. European Command change of command ceremony at Patch Barracks in Stuttgart in June 2009

=== U.S. military decorations ===
Stavridis has received the following awards and decorations of the United States military.

Surface Warfare Officer qualification

| Defense Distinguished Service Medal with one bronze oak leaf cluster |
| Navy Distinguished Service Medal |
| Defense Superior Service Medal |
| Legion of Merit with four gold award stars |
| Meritorious Service Medal with two gold award stars |
| Joint Service Commendation Medal |
| Navy Commendation Medal with three gold award stars |
| Navy Achievement Medal |
| Joint Meritorious Unit Award with one oak leaf cluster |
| Navy Unit Commendation |
| Navy Meritorious Unit Commendation with 2 bronze service stars |
| Navy "E" Ribbon w/ Wreathed Battle E device |
| Navy Expeditionary Medal |
| National Defense Service Medal with two bronze service stars |
| Armed Forces Expeditionary Medal with one bronze service stars |
| Southwest Asia Service Medal with one bronze service star |
| Global War on Terrorism Expeditionary Medal |
| Global War on Terrorism Service Medal |
| Armed Forces Service Medal with two bronze service stars |
| Navy Sea Service Deployment Ribbon with one silver and two bronze service stars |
| Navy & Marine Corps Overseas Service Ribbon with bronze service star |
| Navy Expert Rifleman Medal |
| Navy Expert Pistol Shot Medal |

=== International decorations ===
Commander's degree, National Order of the Legion of Honour of France
Grand Cross Order of the Crown (Belgium)
Grand Cross Order of the Phoenix (Greece)
Commendation Ministry of Defense: "Cross of Merit and Honour First Class" (Greece)
Estonian Order of the Cross of the Eagle First Class
Order of Merit of the Italian Republic Knight Grand Cross of the Republic
Order of Merit of the Federal Republic of Germany Knight Commander's Cross with Star
Grand Officer of the Order of Merit of the Grand Duchy of Luxembourg
The Commander's Cross with Star of the Order of Merit of the Republic of Hungary
Commander's Cross of the Order of Merit (Poland)
Order of Duke Trpimir (Croatia)
Cross of Commander of the Order for Merits to Lithuania
Investiture Medal of the Kingdom of the Netherlands
Order of Naval Merit (Argentina)
Order of Naval Merit in the degree of Grand Officer (Brazil)
Cruz de la Victoria (Chile)
Order of Naval Merit Admiral Padilla (Colombia)
Order of the Peruvian Cross of Naval Merit in the rank of Grand Cross along with a White Ribbon (Peru)
The Emblem of Honor of the General Staff of Romania
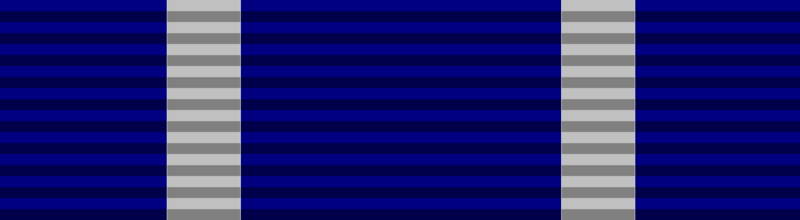
Medal of Honorary Recognition of Latvia
Military Merit Grand Cross Medal of the Portuguese Republic
Order of Vakhtang Gorgasali – I Rank (Georgia)
Albanian Medal of Gratitude
Slovenian Medal for multinational cooperation 1st grade
Navy National Defense Cross (Guatemala)
Grand Cross (Dominican Republic)
NATO Meritorious Service Medal
NATO Medal for Former Yugoslavia
Kuwait Liberation Medal (Saudi Arabia)
Kuwait Liberation Medal (Kuwait)

=== Other awards and honors ===
Stavridis has received an array of other awards and honors, including the following (listed by date conferred):

- The U.S. Naval Institute Proceedings Author of the Year (1995).
- The Distinguished Graduate Leadership Award of the Naval War College, given annually to a graduate of the college who has "attained positions of prominence in the field of national security" (2003).
- The Naval Institute Press Author of the Year (2010).
- The Intrepid Sea, Air & Space Museum's Intrepid Freedom Award, "presented to a national or international leader who has distinguished himself in promoting and defending the values of freedom and democracy" (2011).
- The AFCEA's David Sarnoff Award, the group's highest honor, given "to recognize individuals who have made lasting and significant contributions to global peace" (2011).
- The Archons of the Ecumenical Patriarchate Order of St. Andrew the Apostle's Athenagoras Human Rights Award, accepted on behalf of the U.S. armed forces (2011).
- Honoree, Federal Computer Week "Federal 100" (2011).
- The Navy League of the United States's Alfred Thayer Mahan Award for Literary Achievement (2011).
- The Jewish Institute for National Security Affairs (JINSA) Henry M. Jackson Distinguished Service Award, given "in recognition of his service to the defense of the United States and our European allies, and for strengthening security cooperation with Israel" (2011).
- The Atlantic Council's Distinguished Military Leadership Award (2011)
- The Business Executives for National Security's Eisenhower Award (2012).
- The Chian Federation's 33rd Annual Homeric Award (2012)
- The first recipient of the Distinguished Ally of the Israel Defense Forces Award presented by IDF Chief of Staff General Benny Gantz April 11, 2013.
- Gold medal, Trinity, college historical Society, 2013
- Stimson Center Pragmatist + Idealist Award, for work "to strengthen international security by helping countries in the developing world improve the lives of their people" (2013).
- The Alpha Omega Council's Lifetime Achievement Award, given to a distinguished Greek American citizen (2015)
- The Naval Order of the United States's Distinguished Sea Service Award, for "professional leadership and support to the Sea Services of the United States of America" (2015).
- The Truce Foundation of the USA awarded him their inaugural "Building Bridges Award" at the 2016 Rio Olympic Games.
- The Washington Institute 2016 Scholar-Statesman Award
- Institute for Global Leadership at Tufts University Dr. Jean Mayer Global Citizenship Award, 2017
- Ellis Island Medal of Honor Recipient 2017
- The American Veterans Center 2017 Andrew Goodpaster Prize
- Society for International Development Award for Leadership in Development, December 8, 2017
- Leadership 100 Conference "Archbishop Iakovos Leadership 100 Award for Excellence," February 3, 2018
- Theodore Roosevelt Association "Medal of Honor Awardee" October 26, 2019
- International Churchill Society "Winston S. Churchill Leadership Award" October 30, 2019
- Grand Cross of Colombia, August 3, 2022
- Selected as a 2023 United States Naval Academy Distinguished Graduate by the U.S. Naval Academy Alumni Association and Foundation
- Mystic Seaport Museum "America and the Sea Award" October 4, 2023
- National Committee on American Foreign Policy Hans Morganthau Award, 2023, November 14, 2023
- In March 2024, he was selected as a Winston Churchill Fellow by the International Churchill Society, and gave the annual Churchill lecture at Westminster College
- The Naval War College Foundation’s 2024 Sentinel of the Sea Award recipient, given to American citizens representing the traditions and values of the U.S. Naval War College.
- Florida Veterans' Hall of Fame Class of 2024 inductee, February 7, 2025
- 2025 Lone Sailor Award, "given to Sea Service veterans who have excelled with distinction in their respective careers during or after their service," September 9, 2025.

== Selected works ==
- The Turning Tide: A Novel of Love and War, November 2026 ISBN 978-0-593-65264-0
- 2084 (A Novel of Future War), May 2026 ISBN 978-0-593-48989-5
- The Admiral's Bookshelf, U.S. Naval Institute Press, March 2025, ISBN 978-1-68247-254-5
- The Restless Wave, Penguin Press, Oct 2025, ISBN 978-0-593-49407-3
- 2054: A Novel (with Elliot Ackerman) Penguin Press, 2024, ISBN 978-0-593-48986-4
- To Risk It All: Nine Conflicts and the Crucible of Decision, Penguin Press, 2022, ISBN 978-0593297742
- The Sailor's Bookshelf: Fifty Books to Know the Sea, U.S. Naval Institute Press, 2021 ISBN 978-1-68247-698-7
- With Elliot Ackerman 2034: A Novel of the Next World War. Penguin Press, 2021. ISBN 1984881256
- Sailing True North: Ten Admirals and the Voyage of Character, Penguin Press, October 15, 2019, ISBN 978-0525559931
- Sea Power: The History and Geopolitics of the World's Oceans, Penguin Press, June 6, 2017, ISBN 978-0-7352-2059-1
- The Leader's Bookshelf, U.S. Naval Institute Press, 2017, ISBN 978-1-68247-179-1
- The Accidental Admiral: A Sailor Takes Command at NATO, U.S. Naval Institute Press, 2014 ISBN 978-1-61251-704-9
- Partnership for the Americas: Western Hemisphere Strategy and U.S. Southern Command, NDU Press, November 2010 ISBN 978-0-16-087042-2
- Command At Sea, sixth edition, Annapolis: U.S. Naval Institute Press, coauthored with Rear Admiral Robert Girrier, USN, 2010 ISBN 9781591147985
- Destroyer Captain: Lessons of a First Command, U.S. Naval Institute Press, 2007 ISBN 9781591148494
- Watch Officer's Guide, Twelfth Edition, Annapolis: U.S. Naval Institute Press, Co-authored with Captain Robert Girrier, 2006 ISBN 9781591149361
- Division Officer's Guide, Eleventh Edition, Annapolis: U.S. Naval Institute Press, Co-authored with Commander Robert Girrier, 2005 ISBN 9781591147992

== In popular culture ==
In 2020, character traits developed by Stavridis were used as the basis for a business fable by Amy S. Hamilton, called the Consummate Communicator: Character Traits of True Professionals, which provides a guide for how to interact in the workplace. In it, Jay Admiral, a character based on Stavridis, shares fundamental behaviors that improve working environments. Stavridis wrote the foreword for the book. In October 2023. Stavridis posted on X a brief clip from the Showtime drama "Billions" in which the character played by Damian Lewis asks another character, played by Corey Stoll, if he has been "reading your Stavridis." Stavridis is the subject of a 2024 biography by Dr. Stanley Carpenter published by the US Naval Institute titled: "Admiral James Stavridis: Sailor, Scholar, Leader"

Military offices
| Preceded by Bantz Craddock | Combatant Commander of United States Southern Command; 2006–2009 | Succeeded by Douglas Fraser |
| Preceded by Bantz Craddock | Combatant Commander of United States European Command; 2009–2013 | Succeeded by Philip Breedlove |
| Preceded by Bantz Craddock | Supreme Allied Commander Europe; 2009–2013 | Succeeded by Philip Breedlove |
Academic offices
| Preceded by Stephen W. Bosworth | Dean of the Fletcher School of Law and Diplomacy; 2013–2018 | Succeeded by Rachel Kyte |
